= Erik Lyly =

Finnish flying ace (1914–1990)

Erik Edward LYLY
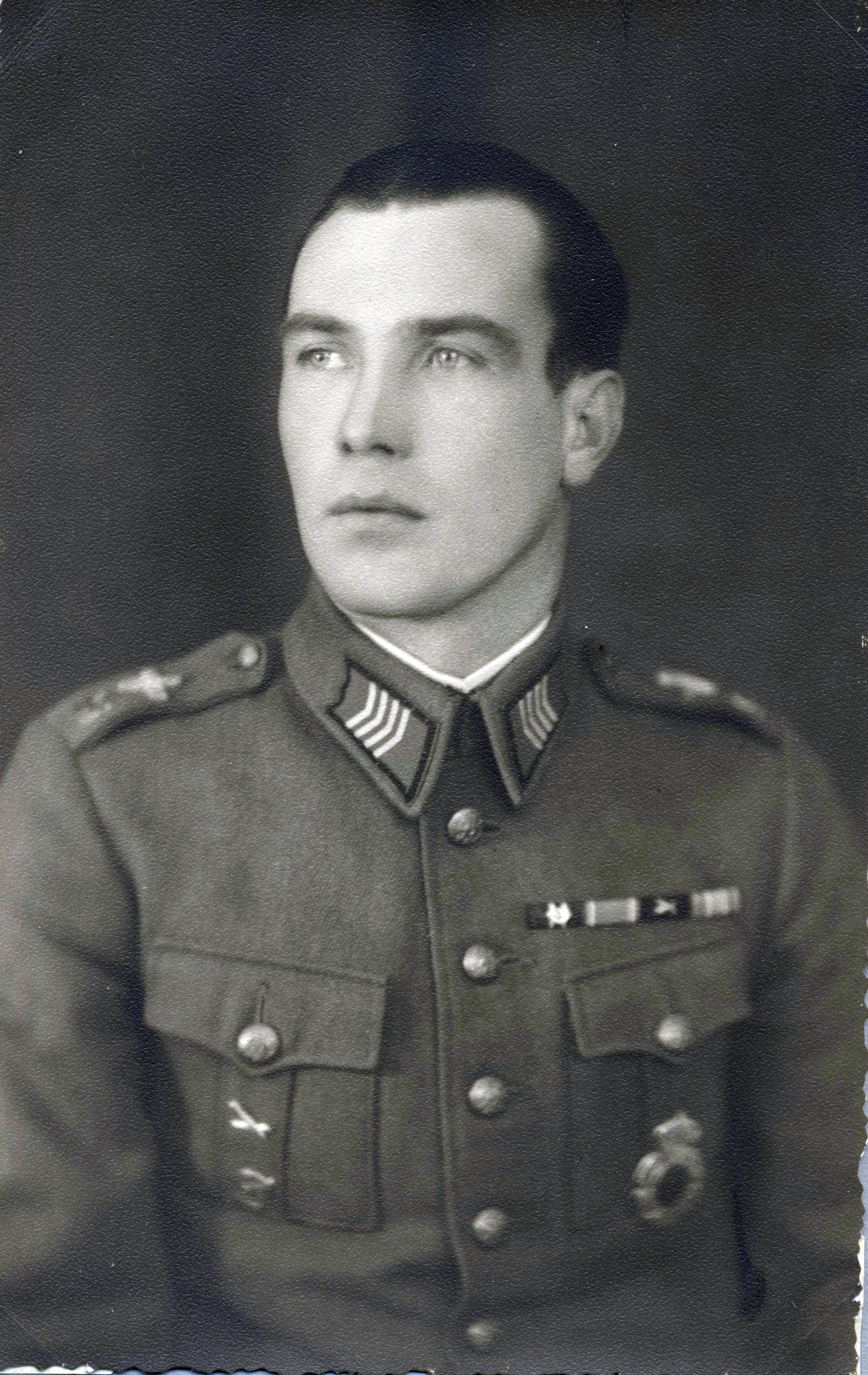
- Born: 5 August 1914; Loimaa
- Died: 5 February 1990 (aged 75); Haaparanta, Sweden
- Relatives: Sisko Seppi (wife); Children: Hannu (b. 1947); Hannele (b. 1948); Erkki (b. 1957); Ilkka (b. 1960)
- Military career
- Allegiance: Finland
- Branch: Finnish Air Force
- Service years: 1939–44
- Rank: ylikersantti (Staff Sergeant)
- Nicknames: Erkki, Eka, radiocall "Pukki"
- Units: LeLv 24, LeLv 34
- Conflicts: World War II; Winter War; Continuation War
- Awards: Cross of Liberty, 4th Class with Oak Leaves and Swords; Cross of Liberty, 4th Class with Oak Leaves; Medal of Liberty, 1st Class; Medal of Liberty, 2nd Class
- Other work: Car dealer, Professional pilot

Erik Edward Lyly (August 5, 1914, Loimaa – February 5, 1990, Haparanda, Sweden) was a Finnish fighter pilot and ace in the Continuation War. He flew in the LeLv 24 and LeLv 34 (HLeLv 34), the most successful fighter squadrons of the Finnish Air Force, often flying as a wingman for the most proficient Finnish ace Air Sergeant Master Ilmari Juutilainen. He achieved a total of 8 air victories during the wars. His highest rank during the war was Sergeant Master.

== Early life ==
Erik Lyly was born in Ypäjä village, Loimaa in Finland 1914. He completed his national service as a flight engineer at Lentosotakoulu (Air Force Aviation Academy) between 1931 and 1932. His youth was marked by the Great Depression of the 1930s.

He worked, among other things, on a steamboat in the South American Line (1933–34). He then moved to the Petsamo region and tried his luck in various professions. A short session as engineer on a fishing boat was followed by owning a taxi company at Liinahamari (1936–37). Next, he took up the task to assemble and build a mini-locomotive sent from England by Mond Nickel Ltd. (1937–38, Railway Engineer, Petsamon Nikkeli Oy). Upon completion of the railway and locomotive to the Pummanki harbour he started as Service Manager for Pohjolan Liikenne Oy (state owned bus company 1938–39). While living in Petsamo, he met Sisko Seppi (POB Kauhajoki 1920) whom he married 1939, just on the eve of the Winter War. He studied at the Tampere Technical School (1939–43) at the Industrial School Engineering Department, from where he graduated as a technician in 1943, due to wars fragmenting the studies.

== The Winter War (Russo-Finnish War 30.11.1939-13.3.1940) ==
The Defense Forces performed the so-called YH, Additional Exercise (Mobilisation) in Oct 1939 and Erik Lyly was called to rehearsal exercises to a Frontier Guard unit (4./Lapin Rajavartiosto). This time performing as a military driver for car, ambulance and a motorcycle. On November 30, 1939, however, he was assigned to the Detachment Pennanen (OsP) and its Machine Gun Group leader. MG groups were subjected to infantry companies and the struggle in a ruthless freezing cold with poorly organized logistics was a delusional delaying battle, reaching from the border to the Nautsijoki line, where the enemy finally was stopped, and the war turned to a stalemate until the 13.3.40 peace agreement.

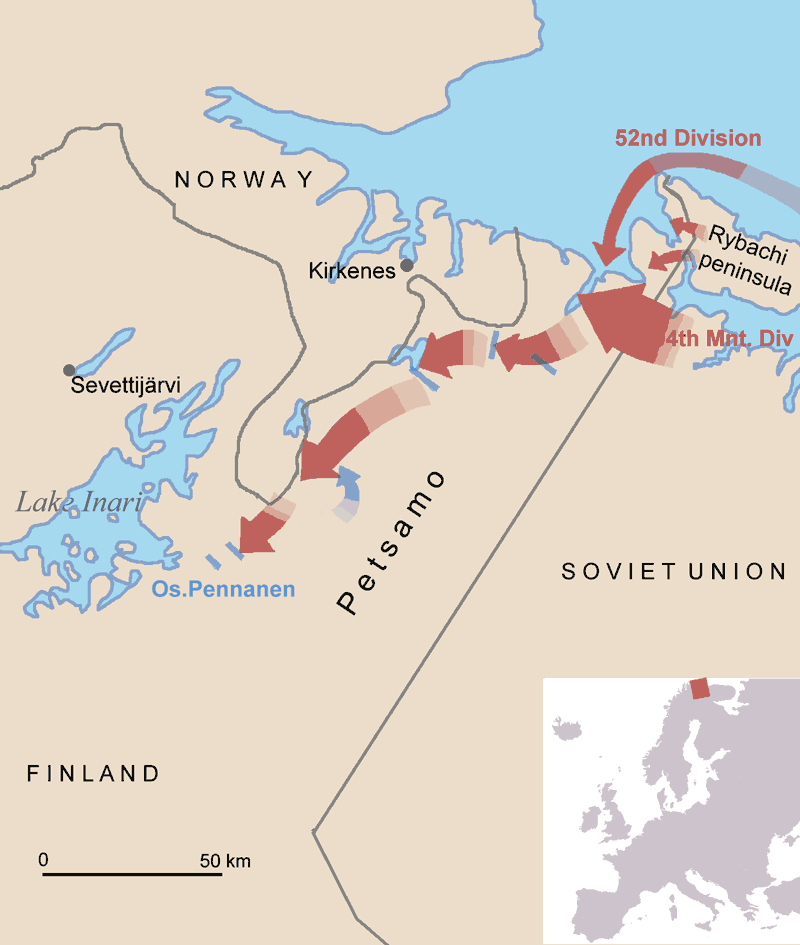
Soviet army attack in Petsamo area

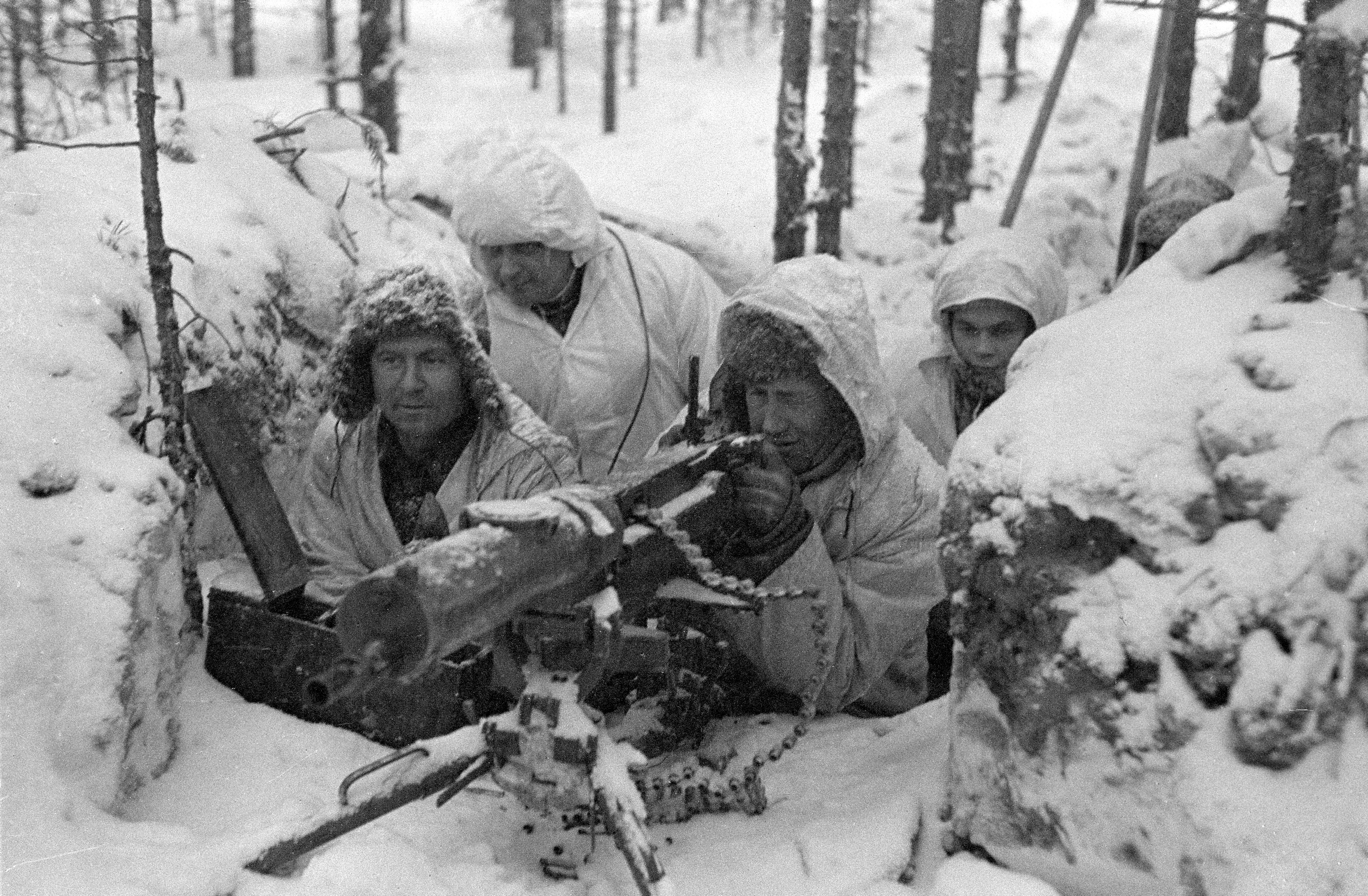
Finnish Maxim M-09-21 machine gun nest during the Winter War

== Truce (14.3.1940 – 25.6.1941) ==
Even before the Winter War Peace Agreement, Erik Lyly was commissioned to the Reserve NCO Pilot Course at the Kauhava Ilmasotakoulu (aviation academy). He received a pilot training at AOK 10 between 9.5. - 11.7.1940. for several types i.e. SM, VI, SÄ, SZ and TU-types. After completing the course, he served as Inspector of the State Aircraft Factory from August 1940 to March 1941 in Tampere.

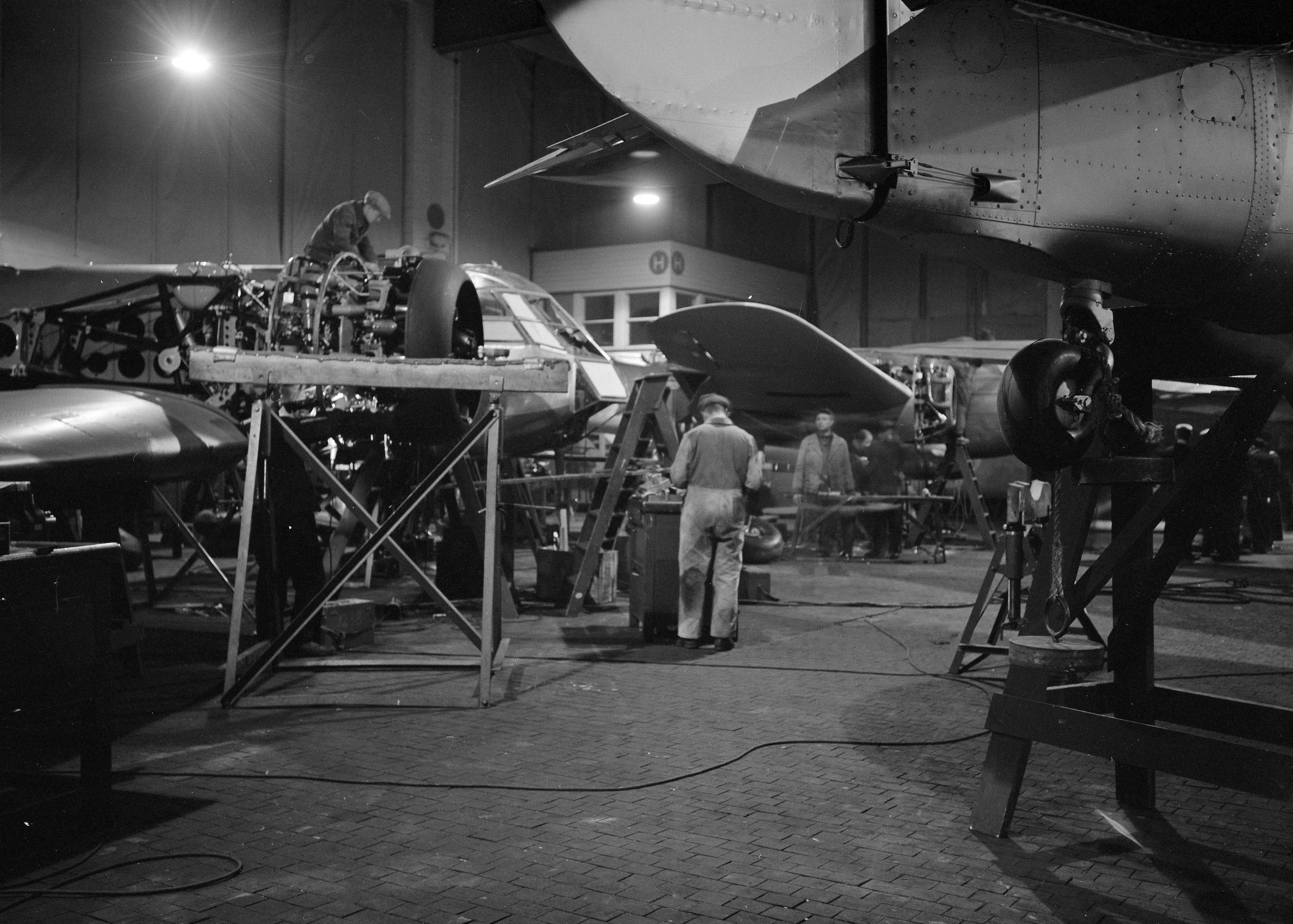
State Aircraft Factory, summer 1941 (VL)

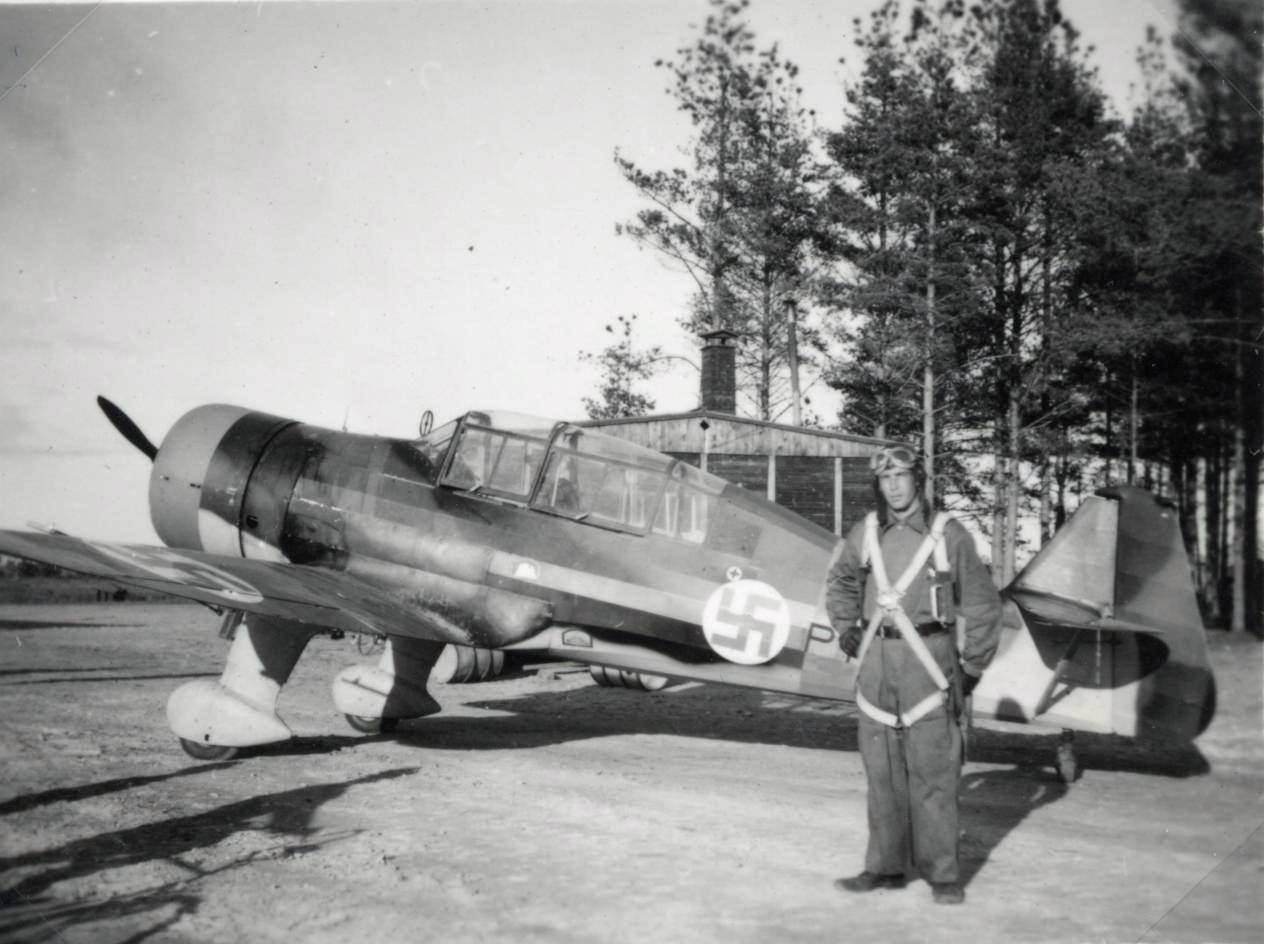
Erik Lyly in pilot training with a VL Pyry trainer, summer 1941

== Continuation War (25.6.1941 – 3.9.1944) ==
With the beginning of the Continuation War additional training followed with Pyry-trainer. After training he was commenced to the Supplementary Flight Squadrons (TLeLv 25 and 35; TLeLv = Supplementary Squadron).

Actual combat action, Erik Lyly did not arrive until January 1942 after being ordered to 24.Squadron and more precisely for 3rd wing (3./24 LeLv). From January 1942 he flew with the Brewster B-239 fighter Finland had bought From US during the winter War, but receiving only after the War in spring 1940. He mostly flew with the BW-374, which he shot down the two(2) enemy aircraft. He often flew as a wingman for Flight Master Sergeant I.E. Juutilainen (highest scoring FinAF ace with 94 victories).

In March 1943, he was transferred to the newly formed 34.Squadron (1./34.HLeLv), which was equipped with newly bought Messerschmitt Bf 109 G2 fighters. The squadron was equipped with updated G6-type in spring 1944. With them he achieved 6 air victories. In total, he completed 411 combat flights reaching to 8 confirmed (+9.5 unconfirmed) air victories. Erik Lyly was never wounded and never needed to jump with a parachute during the war. The worst incident was an engine failure with DB 605 on 10.9.1943 that forced him to make a belly-landing for “AFB Jäppilä” (MT-207).

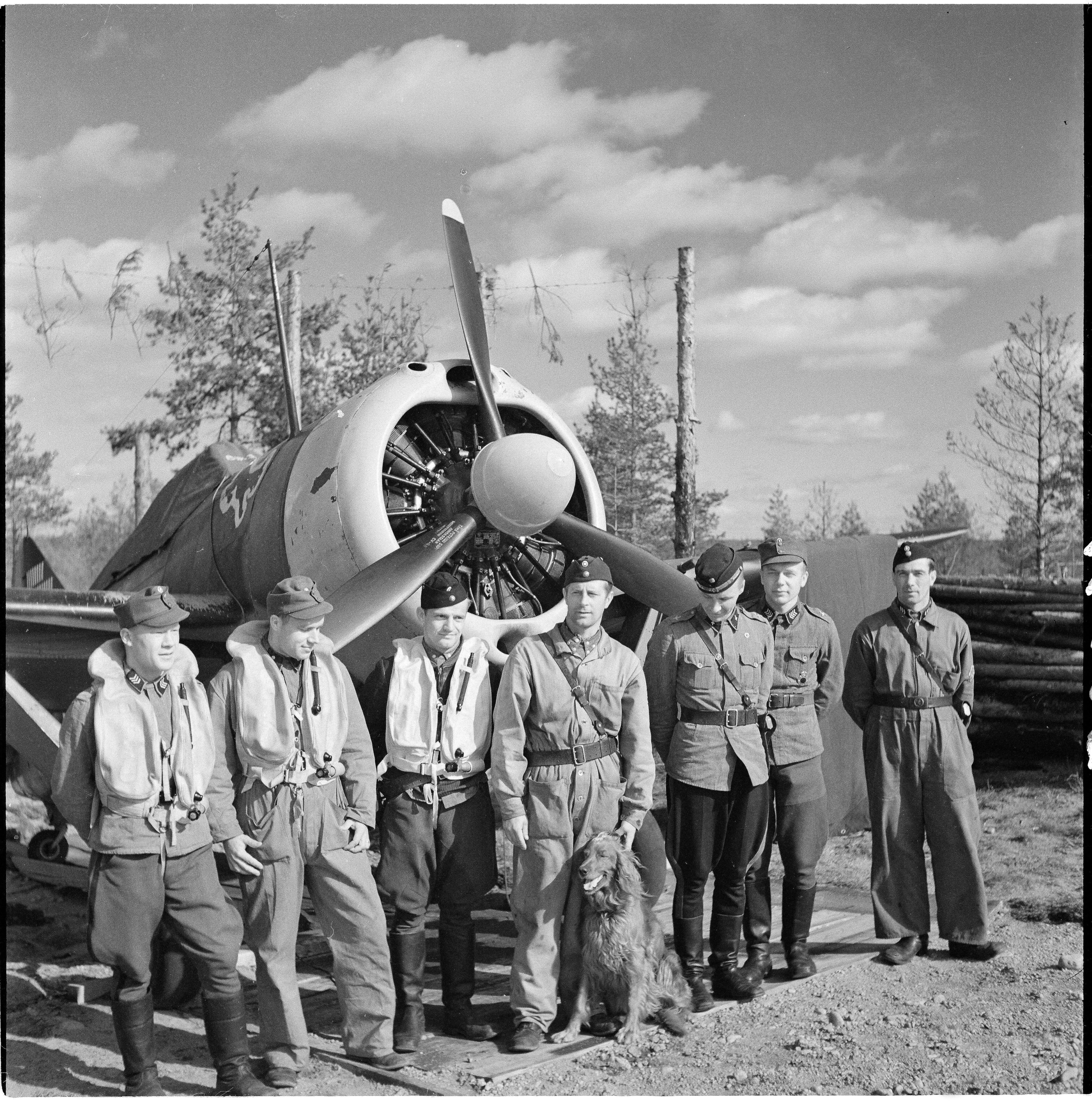
3/24.Squadron at Suulajärvi AFB, summer 1942, Sgt. E Lyly 1st from right

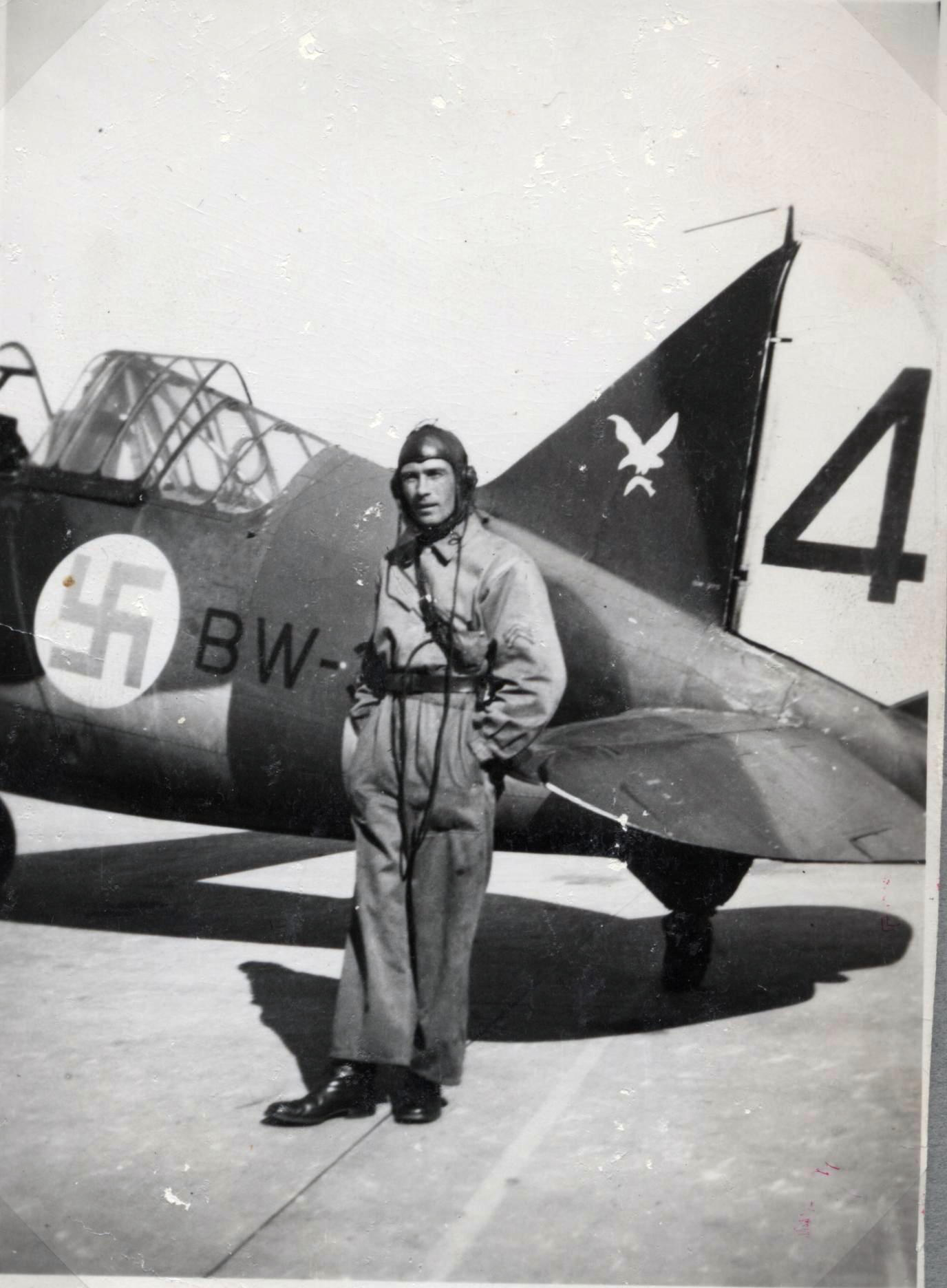
Brewster B-239, FinAF, 1/24.LeLv, 1942

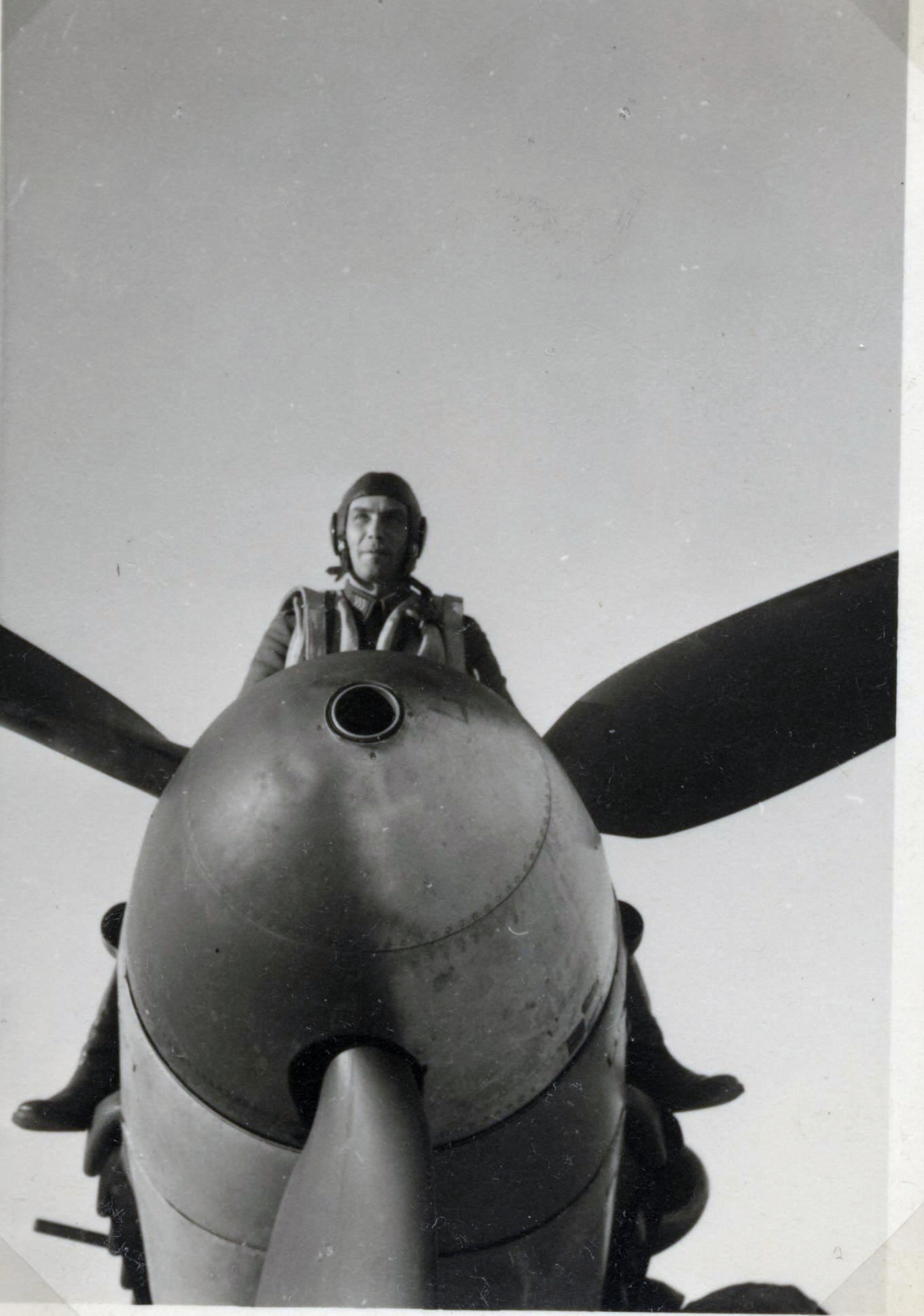
SSgt. E Lyly on top of his Me Bf 109G2, spring 1943, Utti AFB

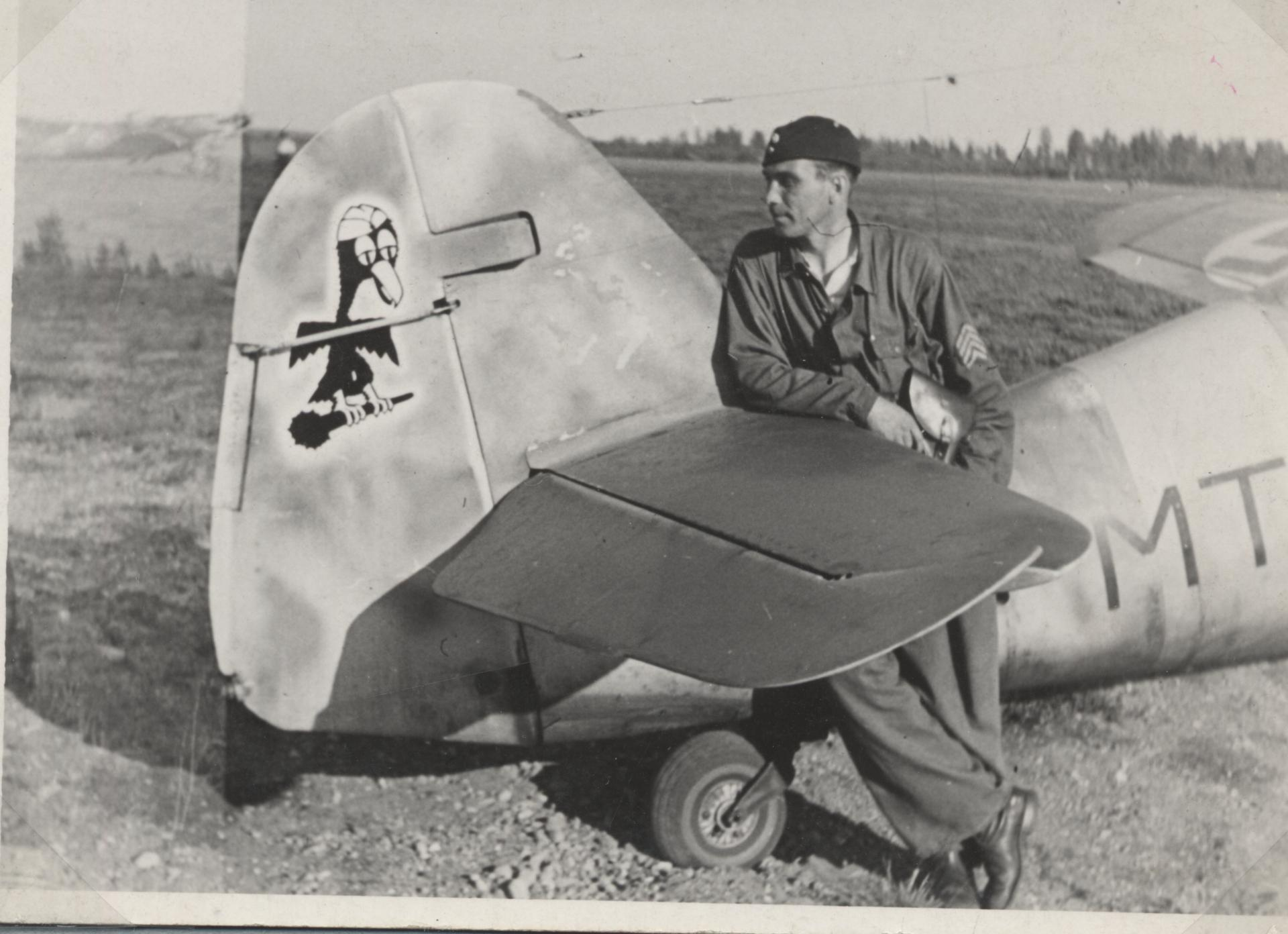
SSgt. Erik Lyly with his Bf 109 G2 aircraft at Utti AFB, summer 1943

== After the war ( - 11.1944 on) ==
After the war, Lyly continued to work as a Service Manager for Pohjolan Liikenne Oy (bus depot), now in Ivalo, after Petsamo was lost to the Soviet hands. Two children were born Hannu (-47) and Hannele (-48). In 1949 he moved to Rovaniemi and set up an aviation company Lentokuljetus Oy together with his war mechanics. The company acquired one Karhumäki Karhu 48B single engine plane, manufactured only in two (2) examples (OH-VKK and VKL). The company owned plane was OH-VKK and it was the first individual in the series. The company operated throughout Finland, but mainly in the Lapland area, carrying out both passenger and freight. When the plane was rented in February 1950, it went over the nose, when taking off from the river and was badly damaged. Two more children were born in Rovaniemi days, Erkki (-57 and Ilkka -60). Erik Lyly continued as a store manager for Aineen Autoliike Oy (car dealer) in Rovaniemi. Later on he founded a new company Polar Auto Oy / AutoRova Oy (car dealer) as a shareholder and managing director of his own car store. Company had a Sisu, Vanaja, Land-Rover, Triumph and Renault brands in Northern Finland. He also drove ice racing with a Renault-Gordini car.

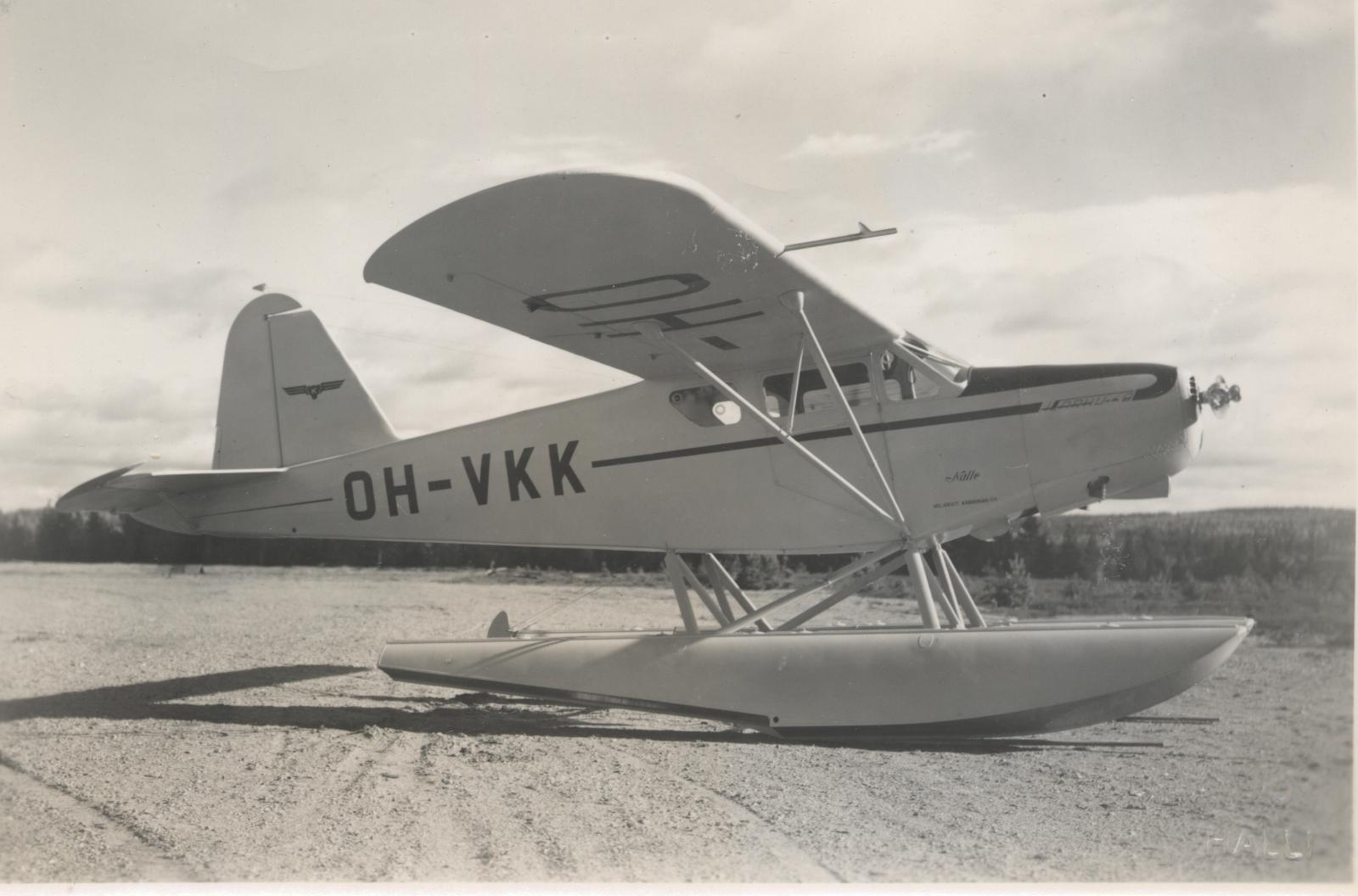
Karhumäki Karhu 48B of Lentokuljetus Oy with floats,1950

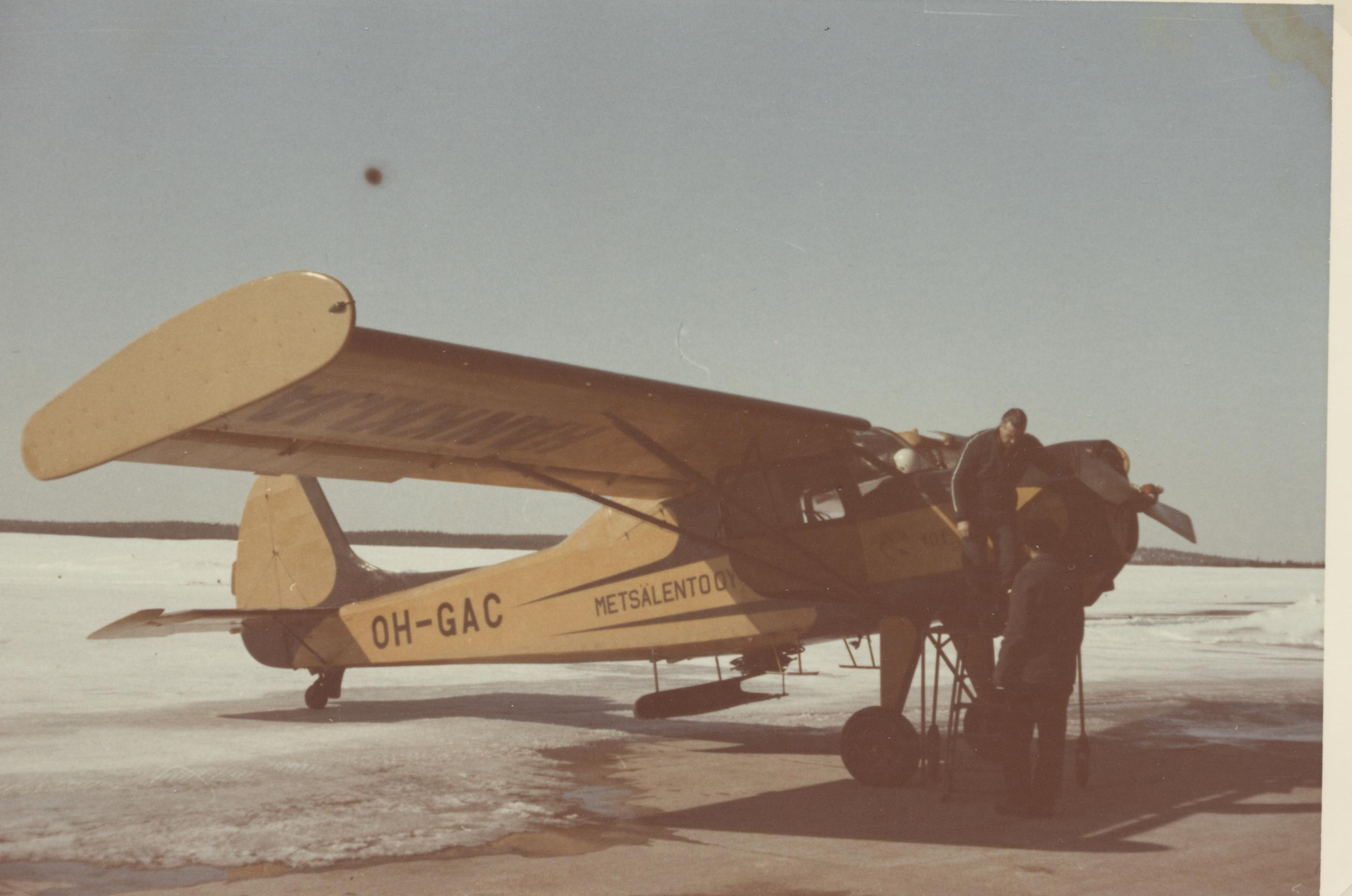
Fuelling up PZL 101 Gawron of Metsälento Oy for forest dusting, 1966

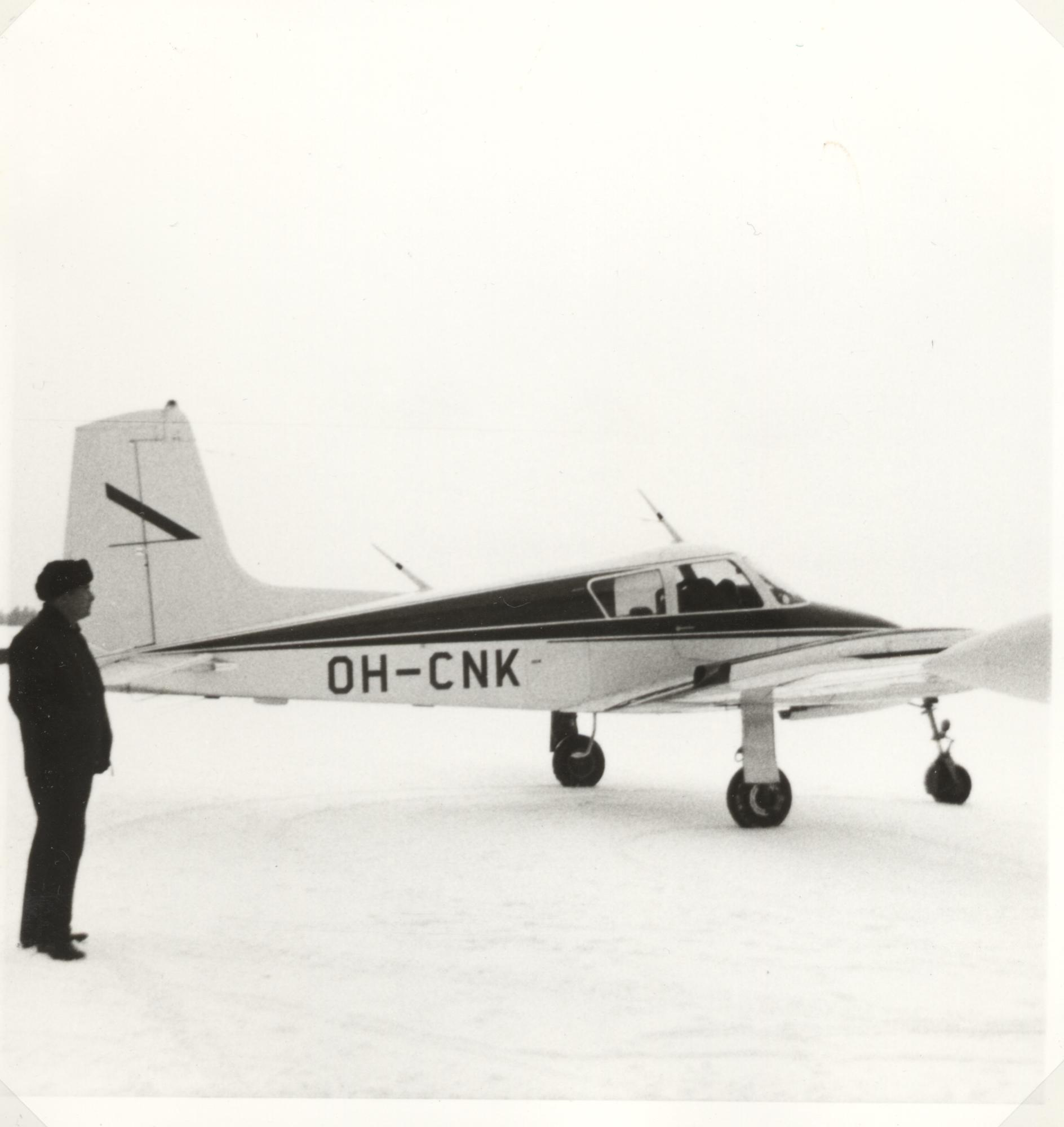
Cessna 310 of Tunturilento Ky (OH-CNK) in 1972 at Rovaniemi Airport

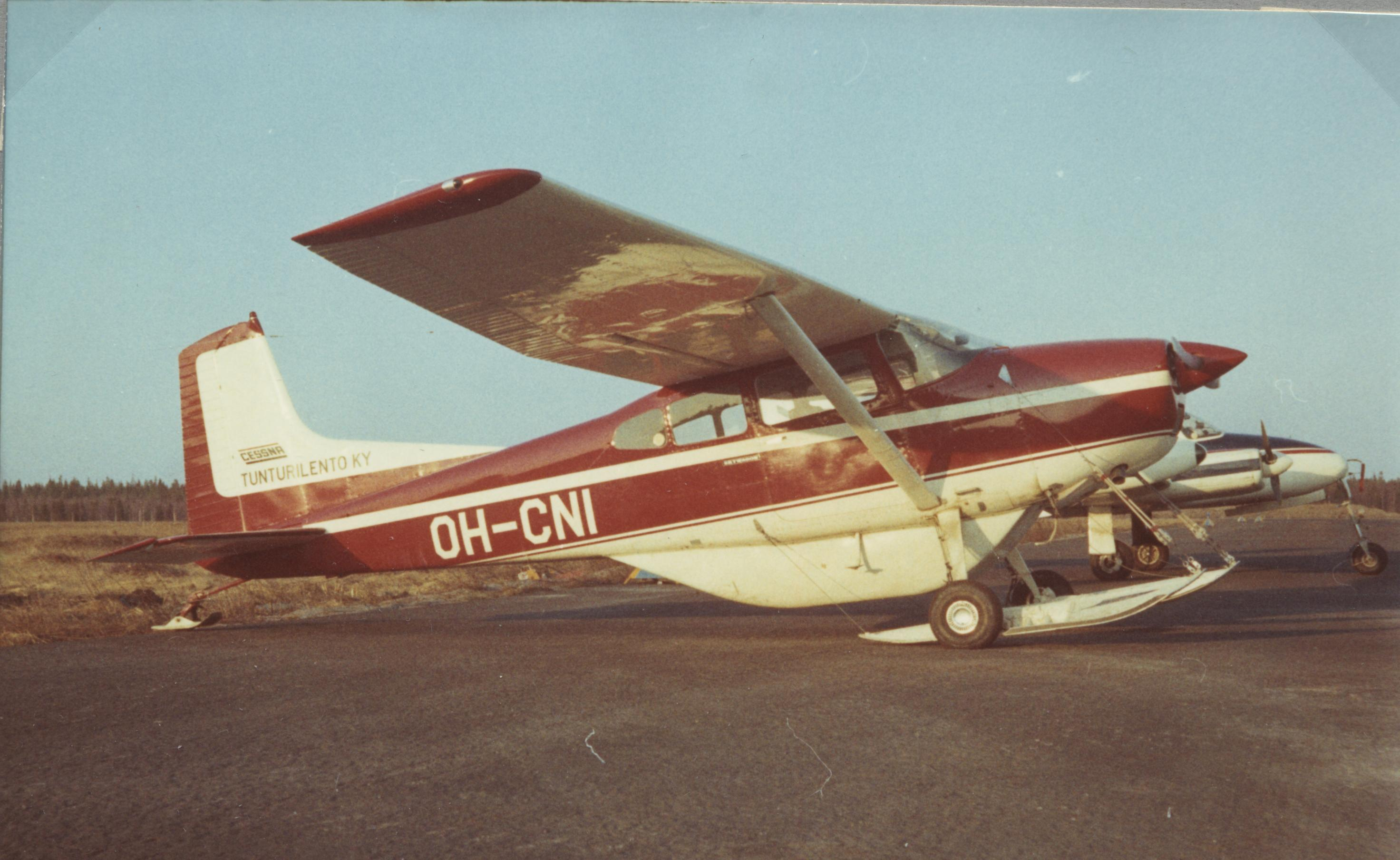
Cessna 185 of Tunturilento Ky (OH-CNI) in 1972 at Rovaniemi Airport

He returned to aviation again in 1968 when he started as a pilot for Metsälento Oy (agricultural dusting). The company operated in Lapland with a PZL 101 Gawron type (OH-GAC). The pilot's career continued with Tunturilento Oy as a pilot from 1968 and he moved to the company's headquarters in Haaparanta, Sweden. The company operated in Lapland carrying out passenger and freight operations with several aircraft types. Among others Cessna 185 floats and Cessna 310 types (OH-CNI, OH-CBC). He maintained a VFR / IFR, multi-engine and float plane ratings. He retired from this task 1975.

He liked recreational aviation as well, as he had done all his life in Rovaniemi with Lapin Lentäjät R.y (Association of Lapland Pilots) with Piper PA-28 and Cessna 152 types. Erik Lyly died at his home peacefully in Haparanda, Sweden at the age of 75 years. He is buried at the Haaparanta (Haparanda, Sweden) church cemetery.

== Honors and Merits ==
Erik Lyly was awarded the following honors:

- 4. class Cross of Liberty with leaves and swords
- 4. class Cross of Liberty with leaves
- 1. class Medal of Liberty
- 2. class Medal of Liberty
- Memorial Medal of the Winter War
- Memorial Medal of the Continuation War
- Memorial Medal of the Air Force
- Memorial Cross of Home Guard
- Memorial Cross of Lapland Units

== Sources ==
- Väestörekisteri: Kirkonkirjat: Ev. lut. srk Loimaa, Petsamo, Kokkola, Ivalo, Helsinki, Tampere, Rovaniemi
- Kansallisarkisto (National Archive): Puolustusvoimien kantakortti
- Kansallisarkisto:T 13 703 LentoR 2 Ilmataistelukertomukset lg42
- Kansallisarkisto:T 19 283 LentoR 3:n suoritusilmoitukset 1943
- Kansallisarkisto:T 19 284 HLeLv 34 Ilmataistelukertomukset 1944
- Kansallisarkisto:Le.R 3 sotapäiväkirja 1.1.1942 - 31.12.1942, T 17 512
- Kansallisarkisto:Sotapäiväkirja LeLv 24, Ilmavoimat
- Kansallisarkisto:Sotapäiväkirjat (kokoelma) > Sotapäiväkirjat-kokoelma > Jatkosodan ja Lapin sodan sotapäiväkirjat > Lentolaivue 34 1943-1943 (17934)
- Kansallisarkisto:Sotapäiväkirja: HLeLv 34, Ilmavoimat
- Ohjaajan Lentopäiväkirja Nro: 1–2, 1941–1944, Ilmavoimat
- Book: Stenman, Kari and Keskinen, Kalevi: Aircraft of the Aces 23 - Finnish Aces of World War 2, Osprey Publishing, 1998, ISBN 1-85532-783-X
- Book: Stenman, Kari, Keskinen, Kalevi, and Niska, Klaus: Hävittäjä-Ässät - Suomen Ilmavoimien Historia 11, Apali, 1994, ISBN 952-5026-00-0
- Book: H.Nikunen, J.Talvitie, K.Keskinen: Suomen Ilmasodan Pikkujättiläinen, WSOY, 2011, ISBN 978-951-036-871-8
- Book: Kari Stenman: Kaartinlaivue-Lentolaivue 24 sodassa, Kariston Kirjapaino Oy, 2011, ISBN 978-952-997-436-8
- Book: Kari Stenman: Mersulaivue-Lentolaivue 34 sodassa, Kariston Kirjapaino Oy, 2012, ISBN 978-952-997-437-5
- Book: Kari Stenman: Hävittäjälentäjät Talvi- ja Jatkosodassa, Tammi, 2011, ISBN 978-951-315-745-6
- Book:Kari Stenman: Mersu - Messerschmitt Bf 109 G Suomen ilmavoimissa, Koala Kustannus, 2017, ISBN 9789522291882
- Book: Jukka Piipponen: Illu, Koala Kustannus, 2014, ISBN 978-952-229-151-6
- Book: Timo Herranen: Petsamosta Hankoon. Pohjolan Liikenteen 50 vuotta. Pohjolan Liikenne, 1990, ISBN 9789529019007
- Book: Tervonen, Ismo: Veljekset Karhumäki Suomen ilmailun pioneereina 1924–1956, Apali, 2002, ISBN 952-5026-25-6
