= List of World War II aces from Finland =

This list includes all of the 96 fighter aces of World War II from Finland. For other countries see List of World War II aces by country

== Finnish fighter aces ==
Name	Total victories	Notes	Fighter squadron(s)
Ilmari Juutilainen	94		24, HLe.Lv.34
Hans Wind	75		24
Eino Luukkanen	56		24, 34
Urho Lehtovaara	44.5		28, 34
Oiva Tuominen	44		26, 34
Olli Puhakka	42		26, 34
Olavi Puro	36		6, 24
Nils Katajainen	35.5		24
Lauri Nissinen	32.5	killed in action 17 June 1944	24
Kyösti Karhila	32		32, 30, 34, 24
Jorma Karhunen	31		24
Emil Vesa	29.5		24
Tapio Järvi	28.5		24
Klaus Alakoski	26		26, 34
Kalevi Tervo	23	†	24, 32, 34
Jorma Saarinen	23	†	24
Eero Kinnunen	22.5	†	24
Antti Tani	21.5		28, 34
Paavo Myllylä	21		28, 34
Väinö Suhonen	19.5		24
Viktor Pyötsiä	19.5		24
Erik Teromaa	19		24, 26
Lauri Pekuri	18.5	#	24, 34
Jouko Huotari	17.5		24
Yrjö Turkka	17		24, 34
Jorma Sarvanto	17		24
Aulis Lumme	16.5		24
Eero Riihikallio	16.5		24
Eero Halonen	16		24
Martti Alho	15	##	24
Aaro Nuorala	14.5		30, 14, 34
Heimo Lampi	13.5		24
Pekka Kokko	13.5	##	24
Yrjö Pallasvuo	13	†	32, 34
Per-Erik Sovelius	12.5		24
Lasse Aaltonen	12.5		26, 34
Urho Sarjamo	12.5	†	24
Onni Paronen	12.5		26, 34
Eino Koskinen	12.5		32
Leo Ahokas	12		24
Iikka Törrönen	11	†	24
Urho Nieminen	11		26
Hemmo Leino	11		30, 14, 34
Niilo Erkinheimo	10.5	##	32, 34
Martti Kalima	10.5		30, 10, 14
Kai Metsola	10.5		24
Eino Peltola	10.5	†	24, 34
Kullervo Lahtela	10.5		32, 34
Veikko Karu	10		26, 28, 30
Ahti Laitinen	10	#	24
Mikko Pasila	10		24
Mauno Kirjonen	10		32, 34
Paavo Berg	9.5	†	26, 32
Viljo Kauppinen	9.5		24
Jaakko Hillo	8		32
Ture Mattila	8		30, 34
Joel Savonen	8		24
Martti Inehmo	8	†	28
Erik Lyly	8		24, 34
Aulis Bremer	8		32
Valio Porvari	7.5		26
Lauri Jutila	7.5		32, 34
Nils Trontti	7		26
Väinö Virtanen	7		32
Toivo Tomminen	6.5	†	28
Tatu Huhanantti	6	†	24
Aarre Linnamaa	6	†	28
Pauli Salminen	6		32
Kelpo Virta	6	##	24
Onni Avikainen	6		24
Lars Hattinen	6		28
Matti Durchman	6		34
Pentti Nurminen	6	#	32
Aimo Gerdt	6		32
Sakari Ikonen	6		24
Gustaf Magnusson	5.5		24
Osmo Kauppinen	5.5		24
Lauri Lautamäki	5.5		26
Mauno Fräntilä	5.5		24, 32, 34
Kosti Keskinummi	5.5		24
Paavo Mellin	5.5	#	24
Veikko Rimminen	5.5		24
Aaro Kiljunen	5.5		32
Pentti Tilli	5	†	24
Olavi Ehrnrooth	5	##	32
Jouko Myllymäki	5	†	28, 24
Sakari Alapuro	5		32
Veikko Evinen	5	†	32, 34
Vilppu Lakio	5		24
Kim Lindberg	5		24
Pauli Massinen	5		28
Atte Nyman	5		24
Väinö Pokela	5		24, 34
Jaakko Kajanto	5	†	32
Arvo Koskelainen	5		24
Ilmari Joensuu	5		26
TOTAL	1,435.5		

== With specific aircraft types ==
=== Fokker D.XXI ===
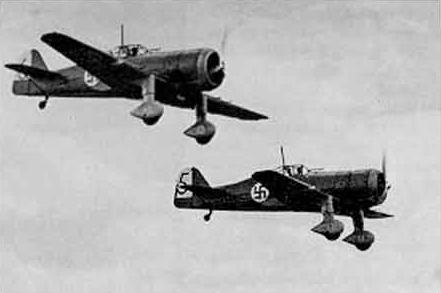
Fokker D.XXIs

Below are all the Finnish aces who have won victories with the Fokker D.XXI

Name	Victories with Fokker D.XXI	Victories total
Jorma Sarvanto	13	17
Viktor Pyötsiä	7.5	19.5
Veikko Karu	7	10
Tatu Huhanantti	6	6
Kelpo Virta	6	6
Per-Erik Sovelius	5.5	12.5
Urho Nieminen	5	11
Pentti Tilli	5	5
Jorma Karhunen	4.5	31
Yrjö Turkka	4.5	17
Olli Puhakka	4	42
Lauri Nissinen	4	32.5
Martti Kalima	4	10.5
Gustaf Magnusson	4	5.5
Eero Kinnunen	3.5	22.5
Pekka Kokko	3.5	13.5
Aaro Nuorala	3	14.5
Ture Mattila	3	8
Eino Luukkanen	2.5	56
Veikko Evinen	2.5	5
Ilmari Juutilainen	2	94
Lasse Aaltonen	2	12.5
Onni Paronen	2	12.5
Sakari Ikonen	2	6
Oiva Tuominen	1.5	44
Martti Alho	1.5	15
Hemmo Leino	1.5	11
Veikko Rimminen	1.5	5.5
Mauno Kirjonen	1	10
Mauno Fräntilä	1	5.5
Olavi Ehrnrooth	1	5
Iikka Törrönen	0.5	11
Pauli Salminen	0.5	6
	116	

=== Gloster Gladiator ===
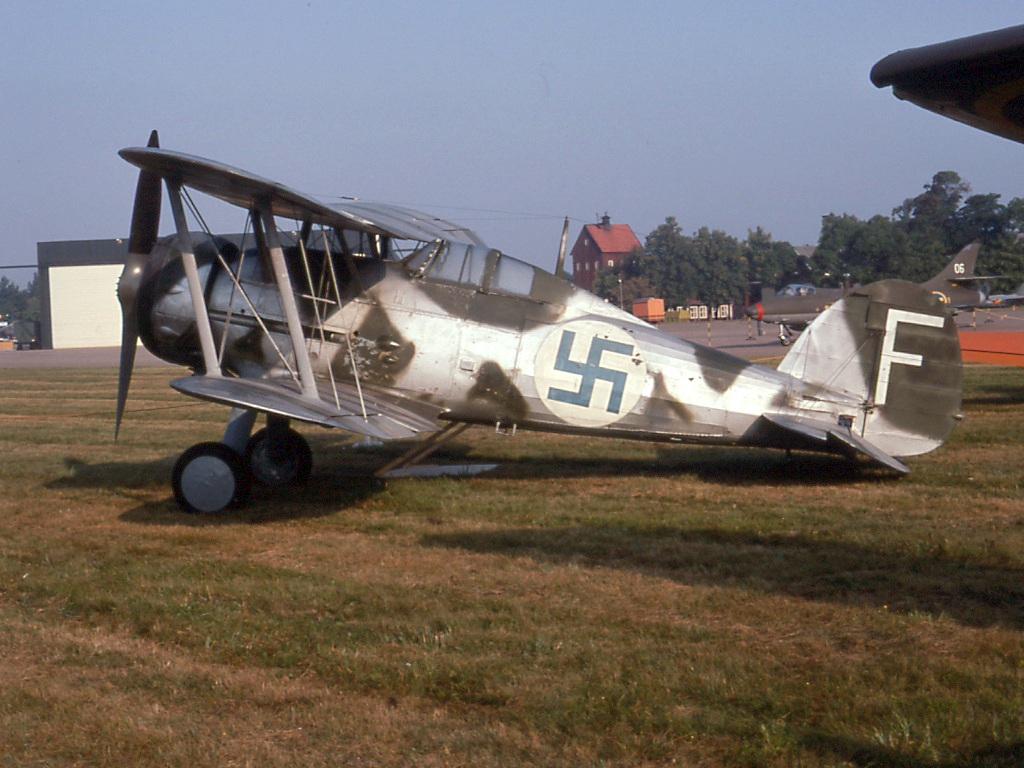
Gloster Gladiator

Below are all the Finnish aces who have won victories with the Gloster Gladiator.

Name	Victories with Gloster Gladiator	Victories total
Oiva Tuominen	6.5	44
Paavo Berg	5	9.5
Ilmari Joensuu	4	5
Valio Porvari	2	7.5
Lauri Lautamäki	1.5	5.5
	19	

=== Fiat G.50 ===
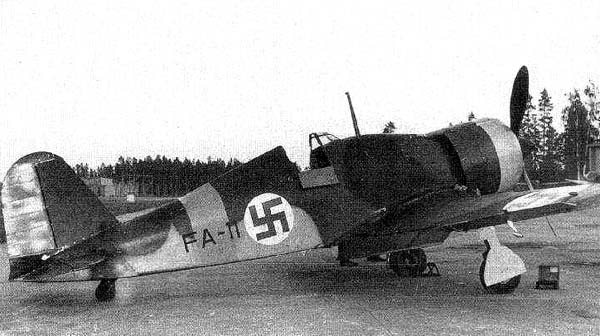
Fiat G.50 Freccia

Below are all the Finnish aces who have won victories with the Fiat G.50 Freccia

Name	Victories with Fiat G.50	Victories total
Oiva Tuominen	23	44
Olli Puhakka	13	42
Nils Trontti	6	7
Onni Paronen	5.5	12.5
Urho Nieminen	4	11
Lauri Lautamäki	4	5.5
Lasse Aaltonen	3.5	12.5
Valio Porvari	3.5	7.5
Olavi Ehrnrooth	2	5
Klaus Alakoski	1	26
Ilmari Joensuu	1	5
	66.5	

=== Morane-Saulnier MS.406 ===
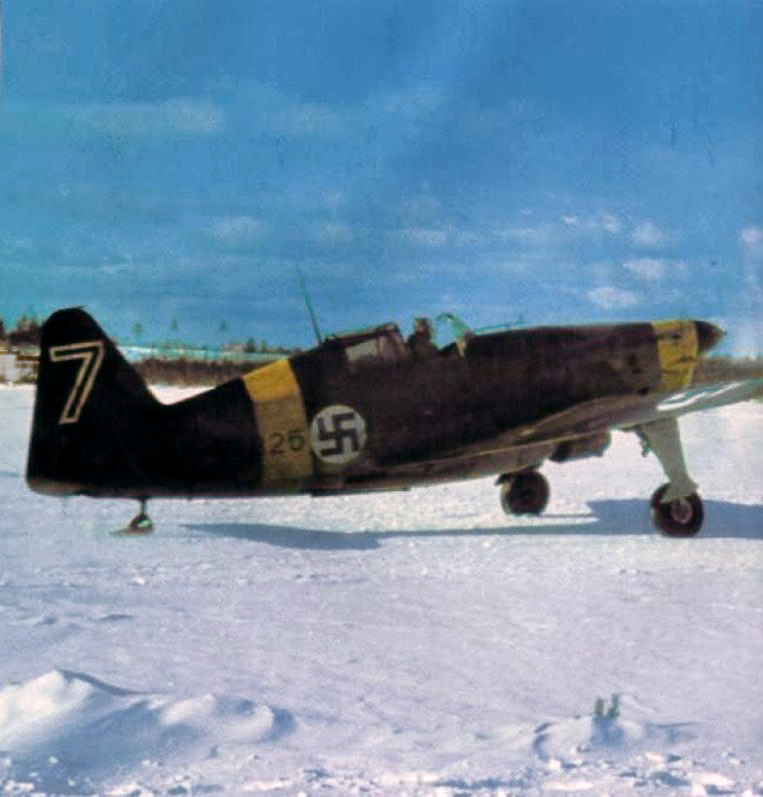
Morane-Saulnier MS.406

Below are all the Finnish aces who have won victories with the Morane-Saulnier MS.406

Name	Victories with Morane-Saulnier MS 406	Victories total
Urho Lehtovaara	15	44.5
Martti Inehmo	8	8
Antti Tani	7	21.5
Martti Kalima	6.5	10.5
Toivo Tomminen	6.5	6.5
Aarre Linnamaa	6	6
Lars Hattinen	6 ^{[1]}	6
Pauli Massinen	5	5
Hemmo Leino	3	11
Veikko Karu	2	10
Jouko Myllymäki	2	5
Paavo Myllylä	1.5	21
Aaro Nuorala	1.5	14.5
	70	
^{[1]} 3 with Mörkö-Morane aircraft.

=== Brewster Buffalo ===
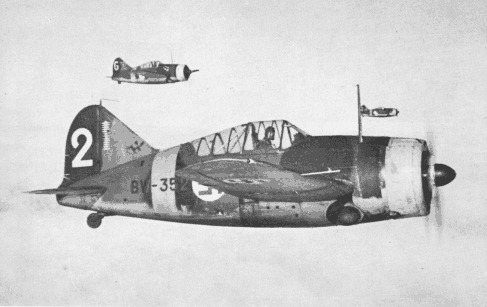
Brewster Buffalo

Below are all the Finnish aces who have won victories with the Brewster Buffalo

Name	Victories with Brewster Buffalo	Victories total
Hans Wind	39	75
Ilmari Juutilainen	34	94
Jorma Karhunen	26.5	31
Lauri Nissinen	22.5	32.5
Eero Kinnunen	19	22.5
Nils Katajainen	17.5	35.5
Eino Luukkanen	14.5	56
Martti Alho	13.5	15
Erik Teromaa	13	19
Lauri Pekuri	12.5	18.5
Tapio Järvi	11.5	28.5
Aulis Lumme	11.5	16.5
Iikka Törrönen	10.5	11
Pekka Kokko	10	13.5
Emil Vesa	9.5	29.5
Jouko Huotari	9.5	17.5
Yrjö Turkka	9.5	17
Viktor Pyötsiä	8.5	19.5
Viljo Kauppinen	8.5	9.5
Eino Peltola	7.5	10.5
Per-Erik Sovelius	7	12.5
Leo Ahokas	7	12
Joel Savonen	7	8
Eero Riihikallio	6.5	16.5
Urho Sarjamo	6.5	12.5
Kai Metsola	6.5	10.5
Onni Avikainen	6	6
Olavi Puro	5.5	36
Heimo Lampi	5.5	13.5
Osmo Kauppinen	5.5	5.5
Paavo Mellin	5.5	5.5
Jorma Saarinen	5	23
Mikko Pasila	5	10
Vilppu Lakio	5	5
Kim Lindberg	5	5
Jaakko Kajanto	5	5
Väinö Suhonen	4.5	19.5
Jorma Sarvanto	4	17
Sakari Ikonen	4	6
Veikko Rimminen	4	5.5
Urho Nieminen	2	11
Ahti Laitinen	2	10
Erik Keskinen	2	8
Väinö Pokela	2	5
Gustaf Magnusson	1.5	5.5
Veikko Karu	1	10
Valio Porvari	1	7.5
Nils Trontti	1	7
Kalevi Tervo	0.5	23
Kosti Keskinummi	0.5	5.5
	432	

=== Curtiss Hawk 75 ===
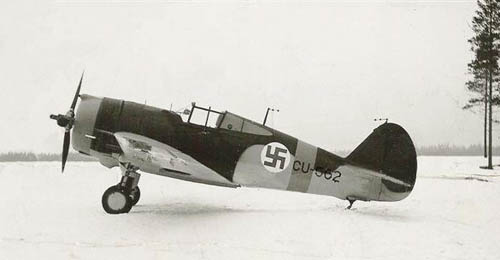
Curtiss Hawk 75

Below are all the Finnish aces who have won victories with the Curtiss Hawk 75

Name	Victories with Curtiss Hawk 75	Victories total
Kalevi Tervo	15.5	23
Kyösti Karhila	13	32
Eino Koskinen	11.5	12.5
Yrjö Pallasvuo	9	13
Jaakko Hillo	8	8
Aulis Bremer	8	8
Väinö Virtanen	7	7
Niilo Erkinheimo	6.5	10.5
Kullervo Lahtela	6	10.5
Pentti Nurminen	6	6
Aimo Gerdt	6	6
Pauli Salminen	5.5	6
Aaro Kiljunen	5.5	5.5
Mauno Kirjonen	5	10
Sakari Alapuro	5	5
Arvo Koskelainen	5	5
Paavo Berg	4.5	9.5
Lauri Jutila	4	7.5
Olavi Ehrnrooth	2	5
Mauno Fräntilä	1.5	5.5
Veikko Evinen	1.5	5
	136	

=== Messerschmitt Bf 109 ===
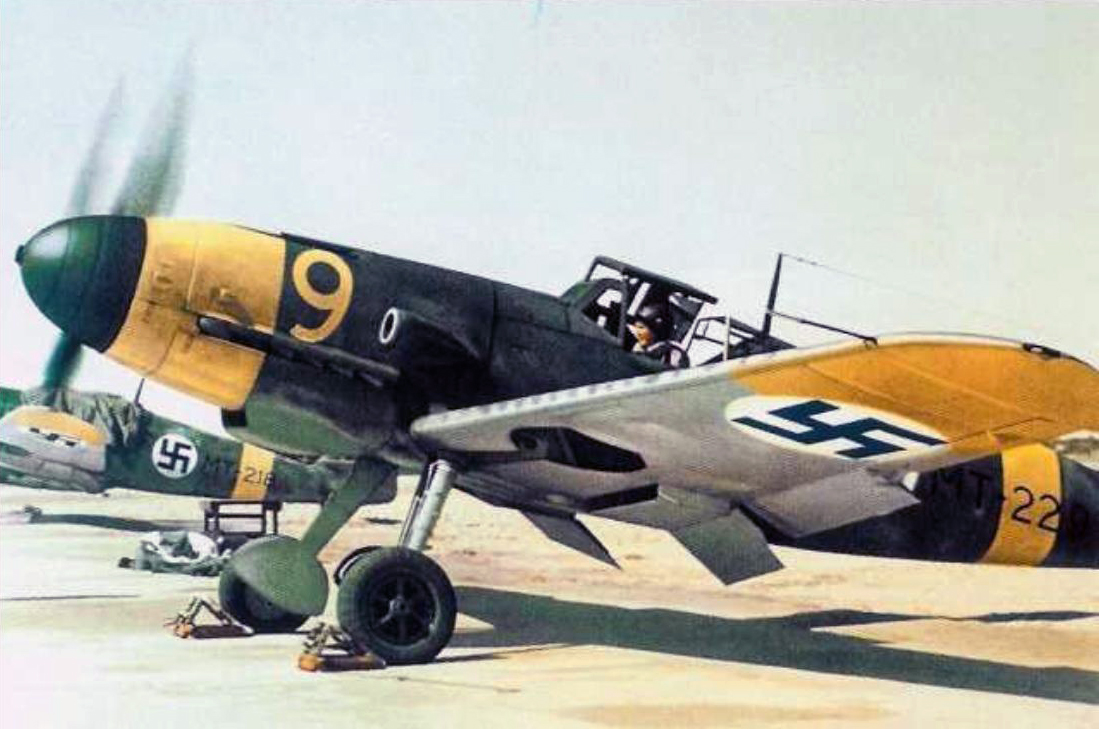
Messerschmitt Bf 109Gs

Below are all the Finnish aces who have won victories with the Messerschmitt Bf 109

Name	Victories with Messerschmitt Bf 109	Victories total
Ilmari Juutilainen	58	94
Eino Luukkanen	39	56
Hans Wind	36	75
Urho Lehtovaara	29.5	44.5
Olavi Puro	28.5	36
Olli Puhakka	25	42
Klaus Alakoski	25	26
Emil Vesa	20	29.5
Paavo Myllylä	19.5	21
Kyösti Karhila	19	32
Nils Katajainen	18	35.5
Jorma Saarinen	18	23
Tapio Järvi	17	28.5
Eero Halonen	16	16
Väinö Suhonen	15	19.5
Antti Tani	14.5	21.5
Oiva Tuominen	13	44
Eero Riihikallio	10	16.5
Aaro Nuorala	10	14.5
Jouko Huotari	8	17.5
Heimo Lampi	8	13.5
Ahti Laitinen	8	10
Kalevi Tervo	7	23
Lasse Aaltonen	7	12.5
Hemmo Leino	6.5	11
Lauri Nissinen	6	32.5
Erik Teromaa	6	19
Lauri Pekuri	6	18.5
Urho Sarjamo	6	12.5
Erik Lyly	6	8
Matti Durchman	6	6
Aulis Lumme	5	16.5
Onni Paronen	5	12.5
Leo Ahokas	5	12
Mikko Pasila	5	10
Ture Mattila	5	8
Kosti Keskinummi	5	5.5
Atte Nyman	5	5
Kullervo Lahtela	4.5	10.5
Yrjö Pallasvuo	4	13
Niilo Erkinheimo	4	10.5
Kai Metsola	4	10.5
Mauno Kirjonen	4	10
Viktor Pyötsiä	3.5	19.5
Lauri Jutila	3.5	7.5
Yrjö Turkka	3	17
Eino Peltola	3	10.5
Mauno Fräntilä	3	5.5
Jouko Myllymäki	3	5
Väinö Pokela	3	5
Viljo Kauppinen	1	9.5
Joel Savonen	1	8
Veikko Evinen	1	5
	592	

=== Notes ===
	=	Mannerheim Cross Knight
	=	Double Mannerheim Cross Knight
†	=	KIA
#	=	POW
##	=	killed in air accident
