= No. 33 Squadron (Finland) =

No. 33 Squadron Finnish Air Force
- Active: December 1944 - August 1958
- Country: Finland
- Branch: Finnish Air Force
- Role: fighter
- Engagements: Lapland War

No. 33 Squadron (Finnish: Hävittäjälentolaivue 33 or HLe.Lv.33) was a fighter squadron of the Finnish Air Force. The squadron was part of Flying Regiment 3. The unit was stationed at Utti.

In December 1944 No. 34 Squadron became No. 33 Squadron. In December 1952 all the Finnish Flight Regiments became Wings and HLe.Lv.33 became HävLv 33. From 1952 No. 33 Sqn flew Valmet Vihuri aircraft. In 1957 the 3rd Wing was named Carelian Wing. It had two Squadrons: No. 31 Squadron (HävLv 31) (former No. 24 Sqn) and No. 33 Sqn (HävLv 33) (former No. 34 Squadron (LLv 34).

In August 1958 HävLv 33 was disbanded and the Carelian Wing continued the traditions of No. 24 Sqn, still carrying their lynx emblem.
