= Ässät =

Ässät or Ässä may refer to:

- HC Ässät Pori Oy, Finnish sports club
  - Porin Ässät (men's ice hockey)
  - Porin Ässät (women's ice hockey)
  - Porin Ässät (men's football)
  - PATA (esports)
- Ässät (band), Finnish band from Oulu
- S Group, Finnish Consumers' co-operative. Also known as Ässä or Ässät
- Jalkaväkirykmentti 11 (winter war), Finnish military regiment. Better known as Ässärykmentti or Ässät
- Jalkaväkirykmentti 26 (continuation war), Finnish military regiment. Better known as Ässärykmentti or Ässät
- List of World War II aces from Finland, Finnish aces of World War II, Hävittäjä-Ässä, Ässä or Ässät in Finnish
