= Olli Puhakka =

Finnish flying ace (1916–1989)

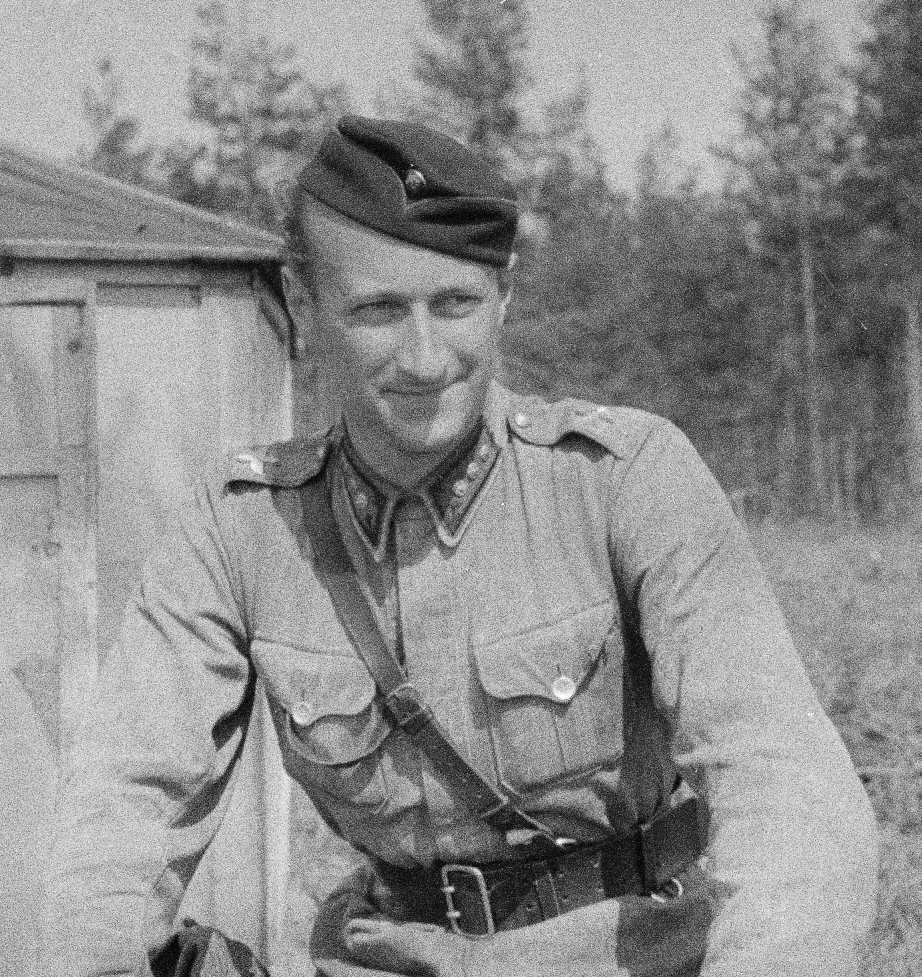
- Born: 11 April 1916; Sortavala
- Died: 28 January 1989 (aged 72)
- Military career
- Allegiance: Finland
- Branch: Finnish Air Force
- Service years: 1935–1946
- Rank: Lieutenant colonel
- Units: LeLv 24, LeLv 26, LeLv 28, LeLv 30, LeLv 32
- Other work: Commercial airline pilot

Risto Olli Pekka Puhakka (11 April 1916 – 28 January 1989) was one of the top scoring aces in the Finnish Air Force with 42 confirmed victories.

== Biography ==
Puhakka served in Fighter Squadrons (LLv's) 26, 30, 28, 24, 32 during the Winter War and the Second World War. He became an ace during the Winter War, downing 5½ Soviet aircraft. Puhakka was actively flying at the front for almost the entire whole war.

During his 401 combat missions, Olli Puhakka scored 42 confirmed victories in Fokker D.XXIs, Fiat G.50s and Bf 109Gs. On 21 December 1944, he was awarded the Mannerheim Cross.

Puhakka resigned from the air force in 1946 and flew commercial airliners until his retirement in 1971.

== Victories ==
Aircraft	Victories
Fokker D.XXI	4
Fiat G.50	13
Messerschmitt Bf 109G	25
Total	42

== See also ==
- List of World War II aces from Finland
