= Gustaf Magnusson =

Finnish major general (1902–1993)

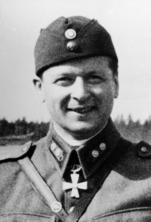
- Born: 8 December 1902; Ylitornio
- Died: 27 December 1993 (aged 91); Helsinki
- Military career
- Allegiance: Finland
- Branch: Finnish Air Force
- Service years: 1923–1946
- Rank: Major General
- Nickname: Eka
- Unit: No. 24 Squadron
- Commands: No. 24 Squadron, Flying Regiment 3
- Awards: Mannerheim Cross
- Other work: Bank manager

Gustaf Erik Magnusson (8 December 1902, in Ylitornio – 27 December 1993, in Helsinki) was a Finnish major general, fighter ace and Mannerheim Cross Knight. He was the commander of the No. 24 Squadron and Flying Regiment 3 during World War II. He also flew 158 sorties as a fighter pilot and shot down 5 1/2 enemy aircraft.

== Life and career ==
Magnusson was born in Ylitornio, Lapland Province to superintendent Leopold and Maria Magnusson (née Hälli). He matriculated in 1923 in Kuopio. After completing his compulsory military service in the Northern Savo regiment, Magnusson tried to get into the Military Academy. He was admitted to course number 6 on 1 December 1923. After completing the course, he was assigned to Naval Flight Squadron 30 on 30 September 1925. Magnusson was promoted to lieutenant on 14 May 1927. Magnusson served in several military assignments in the 1930s, including the Air Force Headquarters. He was promoted to the rank of captain on 30 November 1932. Between 1936 and 1937, Magnusson was twice ordered to the Netherlands, where he tested aircraft that had been offered to the Finnish Air Force and evaluated their air combat qualifications and flight characteristics. In 1938, Magnusson spent three months in Germany and learned German fighter tactics.

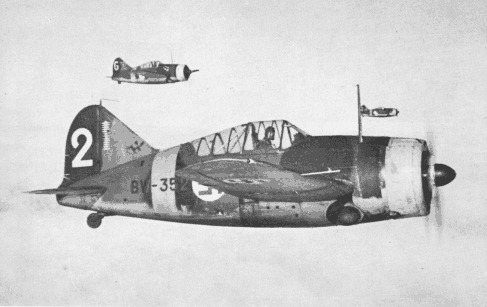
Brewster B-239, the aircraft which Magnusson flew with in the Continuation War.

Magnusson was appointed squadron commander for No. 24 Squadron on 21 November 1938. During the Winter War, Magnusson, newly promoted to the rank of major, flew several combat flights with the squadron, achieving four victories. In the beginning of the Continuation War, on 10 November 1941, Magnusson was promoted to lieutenant colonel, and at the same time he was barred from flying combat missions. He worked as the commander of No. 24 Squadron until May 1943, when he was appointed command of Flight Regiment 3, a position he held until the end of the Continuation War. Magnusson was proposed the Mannerheim Cross for the first time in August 1941, but the proposal did not go through. By recommendation of the Air Force Commander, JF Lundqvist, he was given the Mannerheim Cross on 23 June 1944 (Number 129). Magnusson resigned from the Air Force on 17 March 1946.

After his military career, he worked for the Nordic Union Bank as a bank manager in Varkaus, Lahti and Helsinki until 1959. He was promoted to the rank of major-general on 4 June 1993.

Gustaf Magnusson died on 27 December 1993. He is buried at the Hietaniemi Cemetery in Helsinki.

== Sources ==
- Hurmerinta, Ilmari; Viitanen, Jukka (Ed.) (1994). Suomen puolesta – Mannerheim-ristin ritarit 1941–1945. Ajatus. ISBN 951-9440-28-3.
- Keskinen, Kalevi; Stenman, Kari (2003). Suomen ilmavoimien historia 21 – Lentävät ritarit. Kustannusliike Kari Stenman. ISBN 951-98751-4-X.
- Keskinen, Kalevi; Stenman, Kari (2006). Suomen ilmavoimien historia 26 – Ilmavoitot, osa 1. Espoo: Kari Stenman. ISBN 952-99432-8-8.
