= Olavi Puro =

Finnish flying ace (1918–1999)

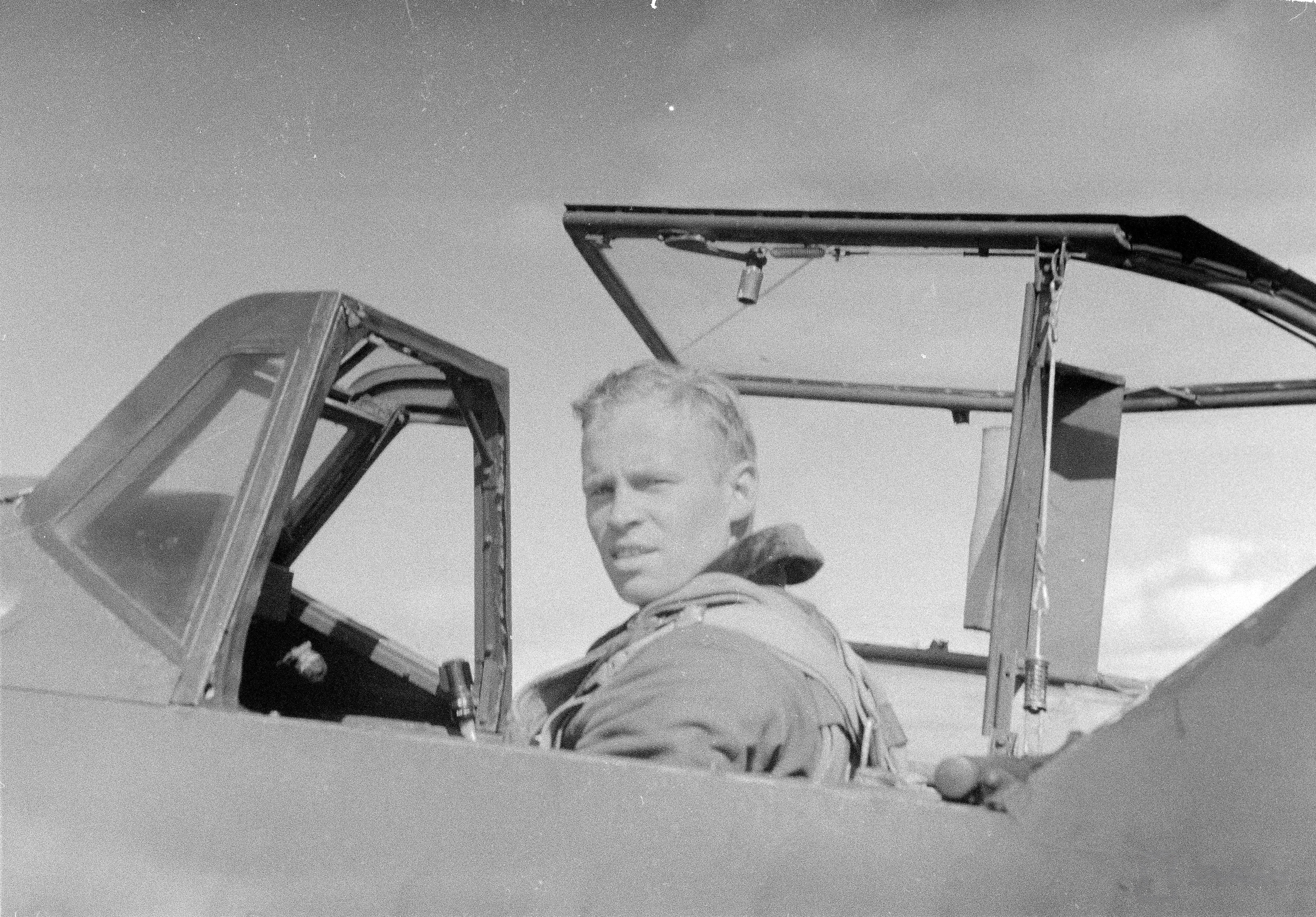
- Puro in the cockpit of his Bf 109 during mid-1944
- Born: 18 November 1918; Helsinki
- Died: 20 June 1999 (aged 80)
- Military career
- Allegiance: Finland
- Branch: Finnish Air Force
- Service years: 1940–1944
- Rank: Lieutenant
- Nickname: Olli
- Units: LeLv 6, LeLv 24
- Awards: Freedom Cross, 1st, 2nd, 3rd and 4th Class
- Other work: Data processing director at a savings bank

Olavi Kauko Puro was born on 18 November 1918 in Helsinki and died on 20 June 1999. He was one of the top scoring aces in the Finnish Air Force with 36 confirmed victories.

== Biography ==
Puro served in Fighter Squadrons (LLv's): 6 and 24 during the Second World War. He became an ace in 1943. Puro was actively flying at the front almost during the whole war.

During his 207 combat missions, Olavi Puro scored 36 confirmed victories in I-153s, Brewster Buffaloes and Bf 109 Gs. Puro was relieved from service at the end of the war in 1944 and took up a job as a data processing director at a bank. His memoirs were published in the book Mersu-ässä in 2011.

== Victories ==
Puro claimed the following numbers of victories in each type of aircraft he flew:

| Aircraft | Victories |
|---|---|
| I-153 | 2 |
| Brewster Buffalo | 5.5 |
| Messerschmitt Bf 109G | 28.5 |
| Total | 36 |

== See also ==
- List of World War II aces from Finland
