= Ilmari Juutilainen =

Finnish flying ace

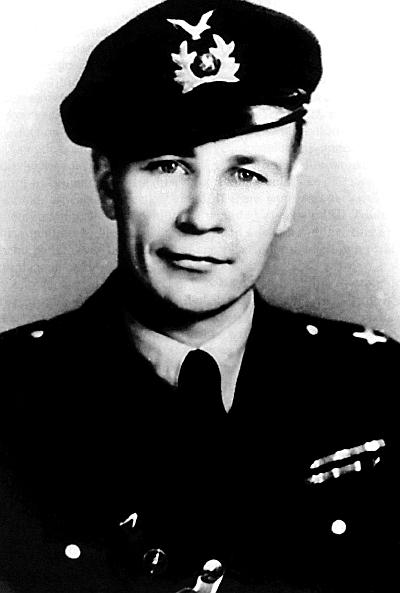
- Born: Eino Ilmari Juutilainen; 21 February 1914; Lieksa, Grand Duchy of Finland, Russian Empire
- Died: 21 February 1999 (aged 85); Tuusula, Finland
- Relatives: Aarne Juutilainen (brother)
- Military career
- Allegiance: Finland
- Branch: Finnish Air Force
- Service years: 1932–1947
- Rank: Sergeant Major
- Nickname: Illu
- Units: LeLv 24; LeLv 34
- Conflicts: World War II; Winter War; Continuation War
- Awards: Mannerheim Cross, 2nd Class (2); Cross of Liberty, 3rd Class with Oak Leaves and Swords; Cross of Liberty, 4th Class with Oak Leaves and Swords (2); Medal of Liberty, 2nd Class; Iron Cross, 1st Class (Germany); Iron Cross, 2nd Class (Germany)
- Other work: Professional pilot

Eino Ilmari "Illu" Juutilainen (21 February 1914 – 21 February 1999) was a fighter pilot of the Ilmavoimat (Finnish Air Force), and the top scoring non-German fighter pilot of all time. The top flying ace of the Finnish Air Force, he led all Finnish pilots in score against Soviet aircraft in World War II (1939–40 and 1941–44), with 94 confirmed aerial combat victories (he himself claimed further kills for a total of 126 victories, but these were unconfirmed) in 437 sorties. He achieved 58 of his victories while flying a Messerschmitt Bf 109G and 34 with a Brewster Buffalo.

One of the four double recipients of the Mannerheim Cross 2nd Class, Juutilainen was born in Lieksa, and died in Tuusula. His brother was the Finnish Army Captain Aarne Juutilainen, nicknamed "The Terror of Morocco".

== Summary ==
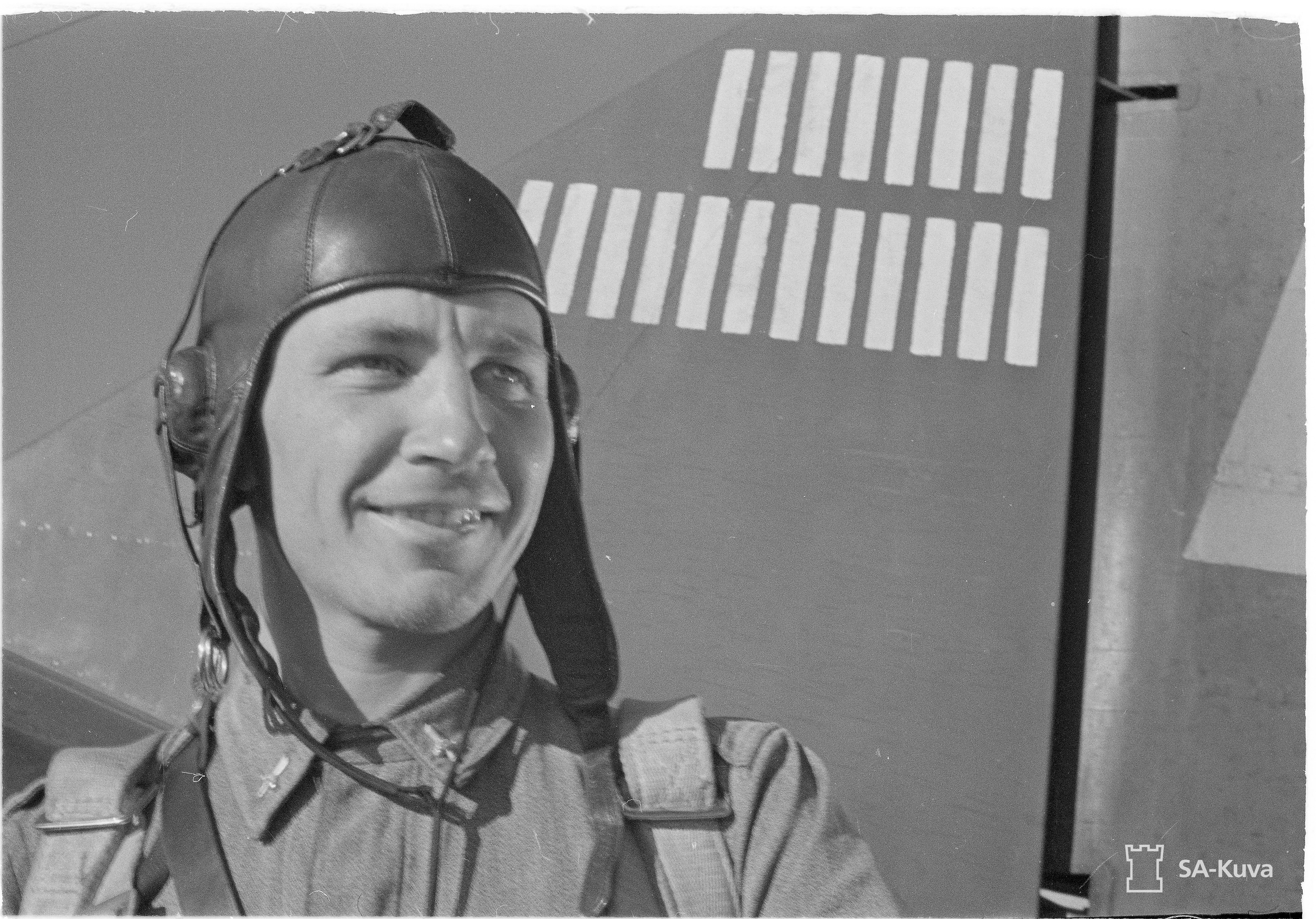
Ilmari Juutilainen 26 June 1942 during the Continuation War.

Juutilainen flew Fokker D.XXI, Brewster Buffalo, and Messerschmitt Bf 109 fighters. He finished the war without a single hit to his plane from enemy fighter airplanes (once he was forced to land after a friendly anti-aircraft gun fired at his Bf 109). Juutilainen never lost a wingman in combat. He also scored the first radar-assisted victory in the Finnish Air Force on 24 March 1943, when he was guided to a Soviet Pe-2 by a German radar operator, who was testing out the freshly delivered radar sets, which officially became operational three days later.

== Military career ==
Juutilainen entered the Finnish military on 9 September 1932 for his compulsory military service, serving as a pilot in the Finnish Air Force starting in 1935. On 1 May 1935, Juutilainen was promoted to sergeant. He was transferred to LeLv 24, operating from Utti, on March 3, 1939. In October 1939, with the situation worsening, the squadron moved to Immola, closer to the Finnish-Soviet frontier.

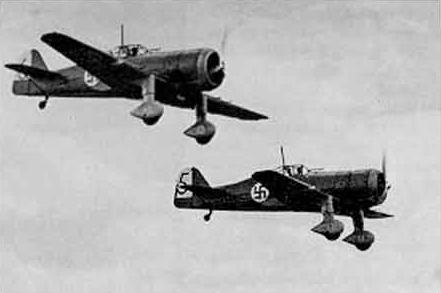
Fokker D.XXI aircraft in the Finnish air force during World War II. Flying this type of aircraft, Juutilainen scored his two individual victories, plus one shared

During the Winter War (which broke on 30 November 1939) Juutilainen flew the Fokker D.XXI. He scored his first victory on 19 December 1939, shooting down an Ilyushin DB-3 bomber and damaging two more. At the end of the Winter War, Juutilainen had achieved one shared and two individual victories.

During the Continuation War, Juutilainen served in 3/LeLv 24, flying a Brewster B-239 "Buffalo".

On 21 July 1941, Juutilainen and five other Buffaloes scrambled to intercept Soviet fighters from 65th ShAP that were strafing Finnish troops near Käkisalmi. During that sortie, he destroyed a Polikarpov I-153 'Chaika', making him an "ace" in the Brewster Buffalo.

A few days later, on 1 August, seven fighters under the command of First Lieutenant Karhunen destroyed six I-16s near Rautjärvi, and Juutilainen (having been promoted to Warrant Officer in the meantime) claimed two of them.

On the morning of 6 February 1942, while reconnoitering the Petrovkiy-Jam region with other LLv 24 pilots, Juutilainen intercepted seven Tupolev SB bombers escorted by 12 MiG-3s. Juutilainen claimed two SBs.

Juutilainen later recalled:

I noticed the bombers at 3,000 metres, and radioed the boys about them. As we intercepted the Soviet aircraft, I spotted a formation of three SBs heading for a nearby railway line and dived after them. Targeting the aircraft to the left of the formation, my fire set its port wing aflame. The SB crashed next to the railway line. Just as I started after the lead bomber, I observed a MiG fighter closing in on me. In spite of the threat posed by the latter, I managed to hit the bomber in the starboard engine, which poured out smoke and oil. Moments later the aeroplane rolled over to the right and plunged into the forest close to the railway line. Turning my attention to the MiG, which was above me, I managed to shoot at it as we raced towards each other. My aim was good and the fighter started to trail black smoke from the engine. He banked away to the east, losing altitude as it went.

On 27–28 March 1942, 3/LLv 24 moved to Immola in preparation for a Finnish Army offensive on Suursaari, in the Gulf of Finland. Although grossly outnumbered over the Gulf of Finland, LeLv 24 pilots were more experienced than their Soviet opponents from Red Banner Baltic Fleet. Even when they had the advantage of surprise and height, Soviet pilots did not succeed in shooting down Finnish pilots.

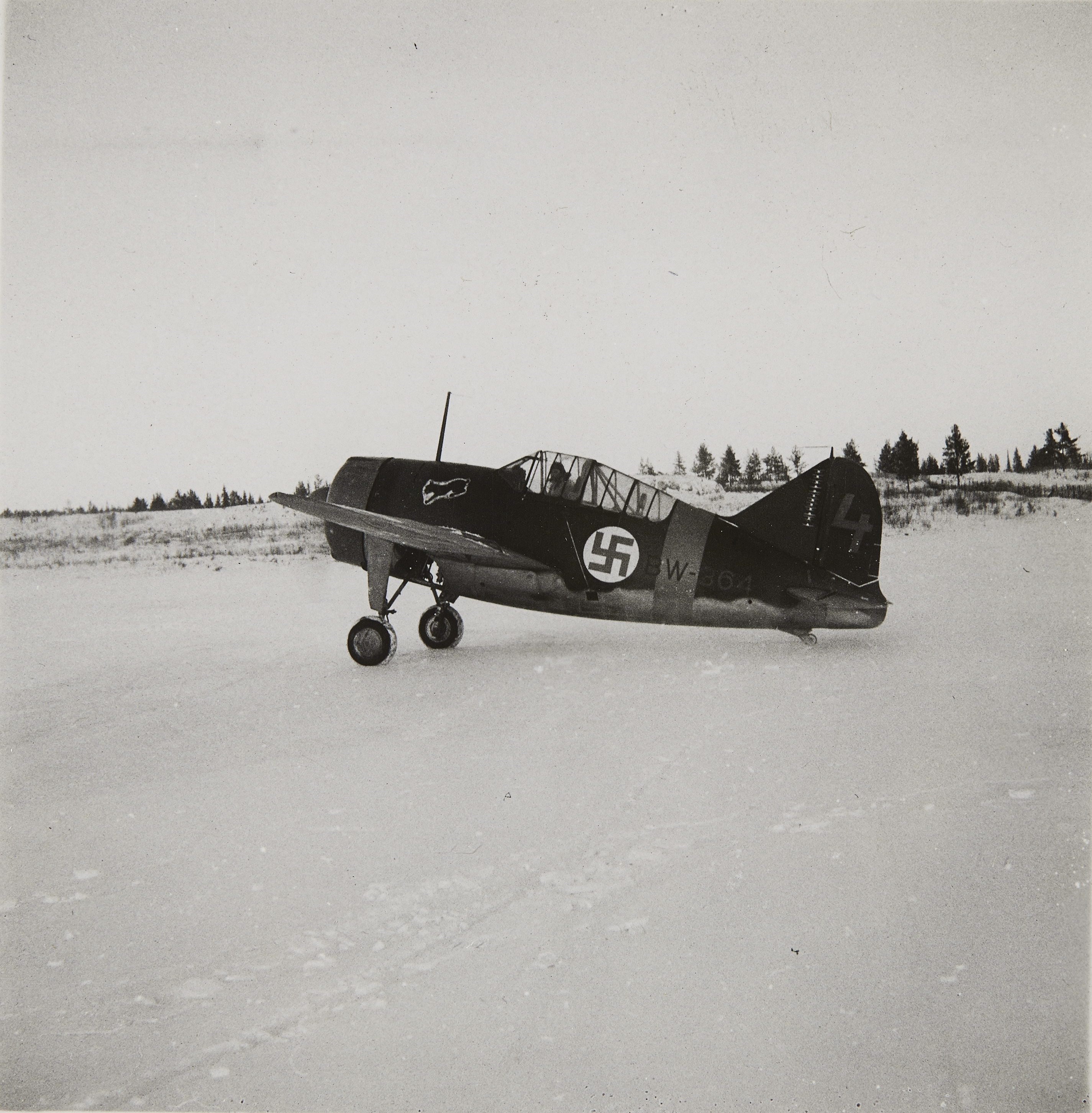
Ilmari Juutilainen and his Brewster BW-364 in the Continuation War at the Tiiksjärvi Airfield during the winter of 1942–1943.

On 28 March, WO Juutilainen, in patrol with Sgt Huotari, attacked some "Chaikas" of 11 IAP over the Suurkylä shoreline, at Hogland, and shot down two of them. These air victories took Juutilainen's tally to 22. A month later, on 26 April, he became his unit's first recipient of the Mannerheim Cross.

On 20 September, he took off with Capt Jorma Karhunen and 3/LeLv 24 pilots for a patrol of the Kronstadt-Tolbukhin-Seiskari region. Near the Estonian coast, they were bounced by ten Soviet fighters. But the Finnish quickly reacted and managed to down three of their opponents. WO Juutilainen was credited with two kills.

All in all, Juutilainen scored 34 victories in Brewster B-239, 28 of them (including three triple kills) between 9 July 1941 and 22 November 1942, in his BW-364 "Orange 4".

In 1943, Juutilainen was transferred to LeLv 34, which used new Messerschmitt Bf 109G-2s. With the Bf 109, he shot down a further 58 enemy planes. He shot down six Soviet airplanes on 30 June 1944 (all confirmed on Soviet loss records), becoming an ace in a day and parallelling Jorma Sarvanto's score on 6 January 1940 in the Winter War.

Juutilainen refused an officer commission, fearing it would keep him from flying.

His 94th and last victory was a Li-2, the Russian version of the Douglas C-47, shot down on 3 September 1944 over the Karelian Isthmus.

== Post-war ==
After the wars, Juutilainen served in the air force until 1947. He worked as a professional pilot until 1956, flying people in his De Havilland Moth. His last flight was in 1997, at age 83, in a two-seat F-18 Hornet of the Finnish Air Force.

Juutilainen died at home in Tuusula (Tusby) on his 85th birthday on 21 February 1999.

== Victories ==
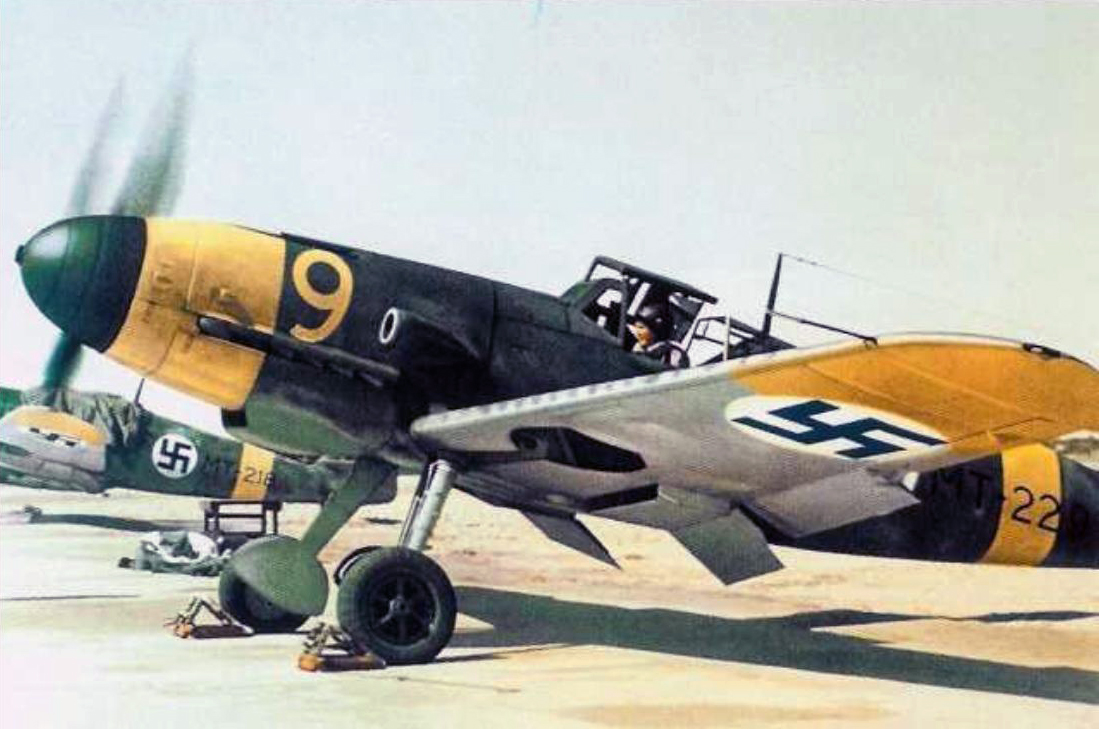
Messerschmitt Bf 109G-2 of the Finnish Airforce. Flying this type of plane, Juutilainen scored 58 air victories.

Aircraft	Victories
Fokker D.XXI	2 1/6
Brewster B-239	34
Messerschmitt Bf 109G	58
Total	94 1/6

== See also ==
- List of World War II aces from Finland
