= Nils Katajainen =

Finnish flying ace (1919–1997)

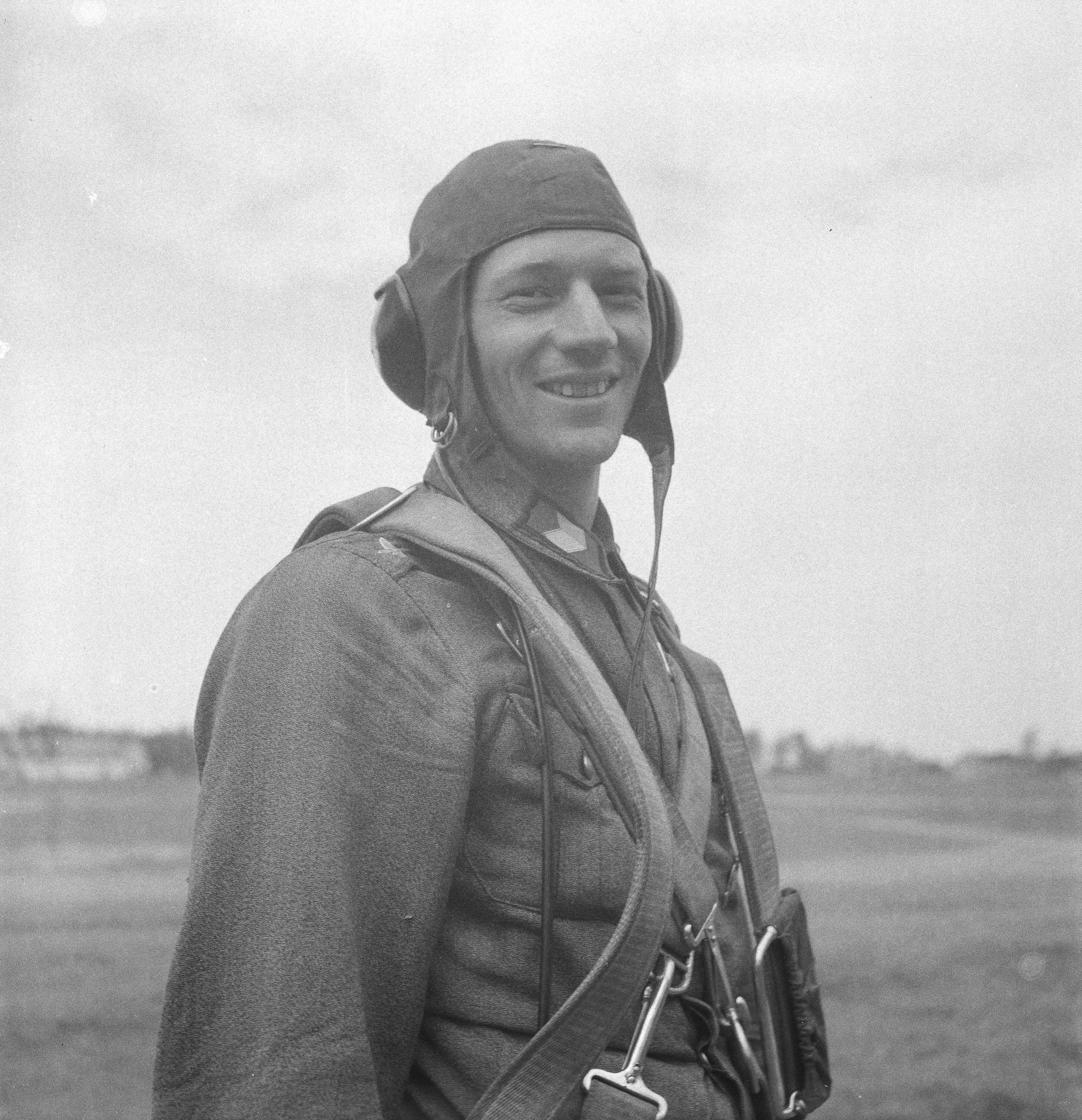
- Born: 31 May 1919; Helsinki
- Died: 16 January 1997 (aged 77); Helsinki
- Military career
- Allegiance: Finland
- Branch: Finnish Air Force
- Service years: 1939–1944
- Rank: Sergeant major
- Nickname: Nipa
- Unit: LeLv 24
- Awards: Mannerheim Cross
- Other work: Entrepreneur

Nils Edward Katajainen (31 May 1919 – 16 January 1997) was a Finnish fighter pilot and a Mannerheim Cross Knight. He held the military rank of sergeant major. He flew 196 sorties and shot down 35 enemy aircraft.

== Biography ==
Nils Katajainen was born to barber Oskar Katajainen and his wife, Jenny Katajainen, in 1919. He began his military career by entering the volunteer service of the air force in 1939. He was promoted to Corporal on 5 August 1940 following a reserve NCO course. During the Winter War he served in fighter squadrons 24 and 32 and was discharged on 1 March 1941.

However, after just a few months' time Finland began its pre-war mobilization, preparing for the Continuation War. Katajainen returned to Fighter Squadron 24, where he belonged to the third flight. During his wartime career, he won 17 victories flying Brewster Buffaloes and a further 18 victories flying Messerschmitt Bf 109s.

During a period of six months in 1942 Katajainen was transferred to LeLv 6 and began training on captured Soviet SB-2 bombers. He flew anti-submarine missions, until his influential friends managed to arrange for him to return to LeLv 24.

Katajainen was badly wounded in an air battle on 5 July 1944. He was discharged from the air force on 10 November 1944 following his hospitalization and subsequent convalescence period. He was appointed Knight of the Mannerheim Cross on 21 December 1944 (number 170). Katajainen was the only pilot from the reserve pool that received the Mannerheim Cross.

After the war, Katajainen worked as an entrepreneur and for the City of Helsinki.

== In popular culture ==
- Nikka Edvardine Katajainen in the anime Strike Witches has been analysed as being based on Katajainen. Specifically, "Nipa's [Nikka] penchant for damaging her units and her self-healing ability are both derived from Nils's reputation for crashing planes but escaping with only minor injuries."

== See also ==
- List of World War II aces from Finland

== Citations and references ==
=== Cited sources and bibliography ===
- Hurmerinta, Ilmari and Viitanen, Jukka (ed.). Suomen puolesta – Mannerheim-ristin ritarit 1941–1945. Ajatus 1994. ISBN 951-9440-28-3
- Keskinen, Kalevi; Stenman, Kari. Suomen ilmavoimien historia 21 – Lentävät ritarit. Kustannusliike Kari Stenman 2003. ISBN 951-98751-4-X
- Keskinen, Kalevi; Stenman, Kari and Niska, Klaus. Hävittäjä-ässät (Finnish Fighter Aces) (in Finnish). Espoo, Finland: Tietoteas, 1978. ISBN 951-9035-37-0.
- Stenman, Kari and Keskinen, Kalevi. Finnish Aces of World War 2 (Aircraft of the Aces 23). Oxford, UK: Osprey Publishing, 1998. ISBN 1-85532-783-X.
