= Jorma Sarvanto =

Finnish Air Force pilot and fighter ace

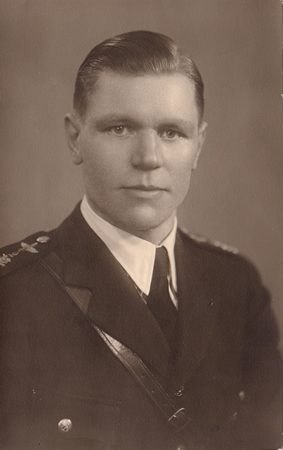
- Born: 22 February 1912; Turku
- Died: 16 October 1963 (aged 51); Inkeroinen
- Military career
- Branch: Finnish Air Force
- Service years: 1937–1960
- Rank: Lt.Col.
- Nickname: Zamba

Jorma Kalevi Sarvanto (22 August 1912 – 16 October 1963) was a Finnish Air Force pilot and the foremost Finnish fighter ace of the Winter War.

== Early life ==
Sarvanto was born and raised in Turku, Finland. He attended high school in Turku and graduated in 1933. He was first admitted to the Pori Infantry Regiment, but decided to apply when the Finnish Air Force sent out a notice that they would select officer trainees. He was admitted and sent to the Reserve Officer Pilot Course number 4 at the Kauhava Air Base. He knew he had come to the right place. He completed his reserve officer training in 1934 and applied to the Military Academy in order to have the military as his profession. In graduated in May 1937 at the top of his military academy class, including army, navy and air force.

Sarvanto was at first sent to Lentoasema 1 (Air Station One) at Utti and later to Lentorykmentti 4 (Flying Regiment 4), which was a bomber squadron. He had wished to fly fighters and requested a transfer to Fighter Squadron 24, which was granted. He started to fly Fokker D.XXIs there in 1937. He excelled in the firing tests, with a hit average of 92%.

== War service ==
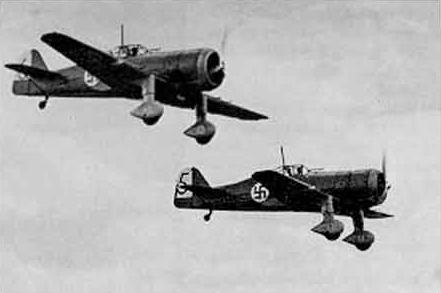
Fokker D XXI planes in the Finnish Air Force during World War II.

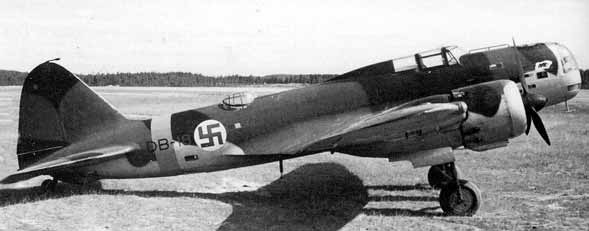
An Ilyushin DB-3M in Finnish markings

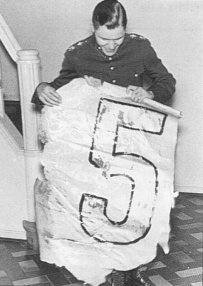
Sarvanto holding a piece of a rudder from one of the downed aircraft on 6 January 1940

On 30 November 1939 the Winter War began as the Soviet Union invaded Finland. Sarvanto saw his first battle on 19 December and his first two victories came on 23 December 1939.

On 6 January 1940 Sarvanto engaged alone in an air fight with a group of seven Soviet Ilyushin DB-3s. In the ensuing encounter, Sarvanto managed to shoot down six of the enemy aircraft in quick sequence. The remaining one of the Soviet bombers was later caught up and shot down over the Gulf of Finland by another Finnish pilot, lieutenant Per-Erik Sovelius.

This incident drew a lot of attention worldwide, and the press considered it a world record. Most of the major Western newspapers published a photo of lieutenant Sarvanto holding a large sheet of aluminum with a big "5" on it, a trophy from one of the victims.

Sarvanto was to become the top scoring Finnish ace of the Winter War with 13 victories. During the Continuation War he downed four more aircraft with Brewster Buffaloes, bringing his total score to 17. He flew a total of 255 combat missions during World War II.

In 1941, he was appointed captain, and he was given different staff positions, e.g. as a liaison officer with the German Luftflotte 1, as the commander of LeLv 24's 2nd flight and later as the commander of TLeLv 35.

== After the war ==
Sarvanto would continue his military career, which led him to become the commander of the Flying School in Kauhava. In 1954, he became Finnish military attaché in London, a position he held for 3½ years before returning to his position at the Flight School. Sarvanto resigned from the air force in 1960, with the rank of lieutenant colonel.

Before the war, Sarvanto married Eine Elisabet Artemo. They had four children. He would work as the CEO of a bank until his death on 16 October 1963.

Sarvanto's grandsons include American champion bagpipe player Jori Chisholm and American political consultant Kari Chisholm. One of his granddaughters is married to General Kim Jäämeri, Finland's military representative to the European Union and NATO.

== Aerial victories ==
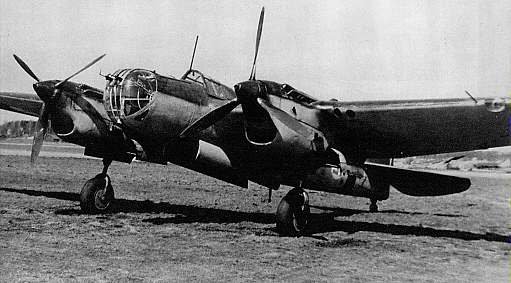
A Tupolev SB

Number	Date	Place	Own aircraft	Enemy aircraft	Enemy regiment
1	Dec 23, 1939	Noskuanselkä	FR-97	SB	44.SBAP
2	Dec 23, 1939	Noisniemi	FR-97	SB	44.SBAP
3	Jan 6, 1940	Utti-Tavastila	FR-97	DB-3	6.DBAP
4	Jan 6, 1940	Utti-Tavastila	FR-97	DB-3	6.DBAP
5	Jan 6, 1940	Utti-Tavastila	FR-97	DB-3	6.DBAP
6	Jan 6, 1940	Utti-Tavastila	FR-97	DB-3	6.DBAP
7	Jan 6, 1940	Utti-Tavastila	FR-97	DB-3	6.DBAP
8	Jan 6, 1940	Utti-Tavastila	FR-97	DB-3	6.DBAP
9	Jan 17, 1940	Heinjoki	FR-99	SB	54.SBAP
10	Feb 3, 1940	Nuijamaa	FR-80	DB-3	42.DBAP
11	Feb 15, 1940	Vyborg	FR-80	DB-3	42.DBAP
12	Feb 18, 1940	Simola	FR-100	DB-3	1.AP KPF
13	Feb 19, 1940	Vyborg	FR-100	DB-3	21.DBAP
14	Jun 25, 1941	Utti	BW-357	SB	201.SBAP
15	Jun 29, 1941	Utti	BW-357	Pe-2	58.SBAP
16	Apr 21, 1943	Gulf of Finland	BW-373	La-5	4.GIAP KBF
17	May 9, 1943	Gulf of Finland	BW-357	Yak-7	?

== Honors ==
- Cross of Liberty, 2nd Class, with swords, of the Order of the Cross of Liberty
- Cross of Liberty, 3rd Class, with swords, of the Order of the Cross of Liberty
- Commander of the Order of the White Rose of Finland
- Order of the German Eagle 3rd Class, with swords
- Luftwaffe's pilot badge honoris causa
