= No. 35 Squadron (Finland) =

No. 35 Squadron Finnish Air Force
- Country: Finland
- Branch: Finnish Air Force
- Role: Training
- Engagements: Winter War

No. 35 Supplement Squadron (Finnish: Täydennyslentolaivue 35 or T-LLv.35, or later T-Le.Lv.35) was a training squadron of the Finnish Air Force during World War II. The unit was first subordinated the Flying Regiment 3. The unit was initially stationed in Vaasa and later in Parola.
