= Flying Regiment 3, Finnish Air Force =

- Country: Finland
- Branch: Finnish Air Force
- Role: Fighter
- Engagements: Continuation War, Lapland War

Flying Regiment 3 (Finnish: Lentorykmentti 3 or LeR 3) was a fighter aircraft regiment of the Finnish Air Force. The regiment took part in the Continuation War and the Lapland War.

== Organization ==
=== Continuation War ===
- No. 24 Squadron: fighter squadron
- No. 26 Squadron: fighter squadron
- No. 30 Squadron: fighter squadron
- No. 32 Squadron: fighter squadron
- No. 34 Squadron: fighter squadron

=== Lapland War ===
- No. 34 Squadron: fighter squadron

After World War II, the regiment and its squadrons were re-organized and the new squadrons were renamed No. 31, and No. 33 Squadrons.

== Aircraft ==
- Messerschmitt Bf 109G-2 and G-6
- Fiat G.50
- Brewster Buffalo
- Caudron-Renault C.R. 714
- Hawker Hurricane Mk.I
- Fokker D.XXI
- Curtiss Hawk 75A-3 and A-4
- Polikarpov I-153
- Fokker C.X

== Sources ==
- Keskinen, Kalevi and Stenman, Kari: Finnish Air Force 1939-1945, Squadron/Signal publications, Carrollton, Texas, 1998, ISBN 0-89747-387-6
- Keskinen, Kalevi & Stenman, Kari (2001). LeR 3: Lentolaivue 30, Lentolaivue 32, Lentolaivue 26, Lentolaivue 24, Lentolaivue 34. Suomen ilmavoimien historia. Vol. 18. Espoo, Finland: Kari Stenman. ISBN 951-98751-1-5.
- Shores, Christopher F. (1969). Finnish Air Force 1918–1968. Aircam Aviation Series. Vol. S2. Canterbury, UK: Osprey Publications. ISBN 0-85045-012-8.
