= Lauri Nissinen =

Finnish flying ace (1918–1944)

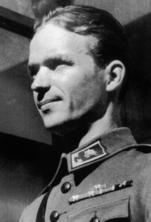
- Born: 31 July 1918; Joensuu
- Died: 17 June 1944 (aged 25); Kaukjärvi
- Military career
- Allegiance: Finland
- Branch: Finnish Air Force
- Service years: 1939–1944
- Conflicts: World War II; Winter War; Continuation War

Lauri Nissinen (31 July 1918 in Joensuu – 17 June 1944 in Kaukjärvi) was a World War II flying ace in the Finnish Air Force.

== Biography ==
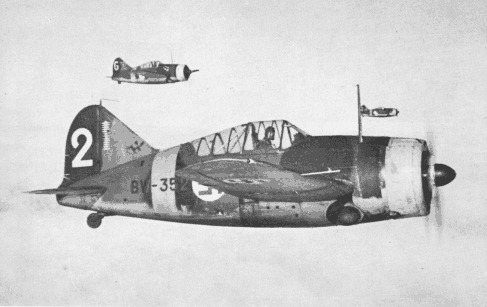
Nissinen achieved 22 of his victories while piloting a Brewster B-239

Lauri Vilhelm Nissinen was born in Joensuu on 31 July 1918 and, for his compulsory military service, joined the Air Force, during which time he decided on flying as a career, applying for NCO pilot training in 1938. Due to his performance during training, he joined HLeLv 24, flying the Fokker D.XXI in May 1939. In the summer of 1939, he was promoted to Sergeant.

As the Winter War broke out, Sgt. Nissinen first claimed an air victory on 1 December 1939, claiming an SB-2 shot down and damaging two others over Viipuri. By the end of the Winter War, he had claimed four victories in total and was a Sergeant Major.

HLeLv 24 then equipped with the US- built Brewster Buffalo. As hostilities broke out again on 25 June 1941, Nissinen again flew operationally. On 7 July 1941, over Käkisalmi, two enemy fighters attacked head-on, Nissinen shooting down both. On 21 July 1941, he again shot down an I-153 in a head-on battle, although his aircraft was damaged and he returned to base. His ground crew found four hits in the engine, one in the prop and several more in the wings.

On 1 August 1941, at Rautjärvi, six Buffalos engaged eight Soviet I-16 fighters, Nissinen's target exploding and its debris damaged Nissinen's right wing. Three I-16s attacked from behind, and his fighter took several hits, shattering the windscreen.

At the end of 1941, Nissinen was the second-highest scoring FAF ace with 15.5 kills. Early in 1942, Nissinen attended Officer Cadet School, from where he then graduated in June 1943 as a lieutenant.

Nissinen was awarded the Mannerheim Cross on 5 July 1942, his number being 69. He held the rank of vänrikki at the time.

Returning to HLeLv 24, Nissinen was made a flight commander and resumed flying missions. His score increased to 26 by the end of 1943. The squadron gradually re-equipped with Messerschmitt Bf 109 fighters in spring 1944.

In May 1944, HLeLv 32, flying the Curtiss P-36, was temporarily strengthened with a Messerschmitt Bf 109G-2 flight commanded by Lt. Nissinen.

On 16 May, Nissinen scrambled against a single Lavochkin La-5 approaching Nurmoila. The La-5 circled at 1500 m and allowed Nissinen to climb to the same altitude before turning to attack from above, shooting down the La-5 after a series of exhausting attacks.

With the renewed Soviet offensive on 9 June 1944, Lt. Nissinen scored two more victories on 17 June 1944 as two flights intercepted Soviet Il-2 ground attack aircraft attacking Finnish positions at Kaukjärvi. Nissinen's wingman, Sgt. Heimo Lampi saw the crippled Messerschmitt of Lt. Sarjamo dive through the cloud and collide with Nissinen's plane. Both planes exploded on impact, and the pilots were killed.

Nissinen flew some 300 missions and scored 32 victories in total. His grave is in Valkeala.

== See also ==
- List of World War II flying aces
- List of World War II aces from Finland
