= No. 24 Squadron (Finland) =

No. 24 Squadron Finnish Air Force
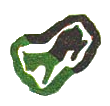
- Lynx emblem of No. 24 Squadron
- Active: 15 July 1933 - 4 September 1944
- Country: Finland
- Branch: Finnish Air Force
- Role: fighter
- Engagements: Winter War, Continuation War

No. 24 Squadron (Finnish: Lentolaivue 24 or LLv.24, from 3 May 1942 Le. Lv.24), renamed No. 24 Fighter Squadron (Finnish: Hävittäjälentolaivue 24 or HLe.Lv.24 on 14 February 1944) was a fighter squadron of the Finnish Air Force during World War II. The squadron was part of Flying Regiment 2.

During the Winter War, all Fokker D.XXIs - Finland's only modern fighter - were concentrated into the No. 24 Sqn, making it the only frontline fighter force.

No. 24 Squadron was the most successful fighter squadron of the Finnish Air Force during World War II, claiming 877 aerial victories for a loss of 38 aircraft and 18 pilots. The unit produced seven Mannerheim Cross winners, including Ilmari Juutilainen and Hans Wind, the two top-scoring aces.

After the re-organization of the Finnish Air Force after World War II, HLeLv 24 was renamed into HLeLv 31. Today it is part of the Karelian Wing, flying F-18 Hornets and still sporting the "Supersonic Lynx" as its emblem.

== History ==
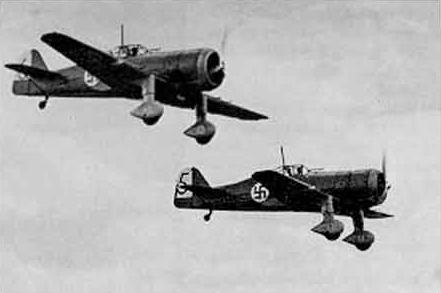
Fokker D.XXI

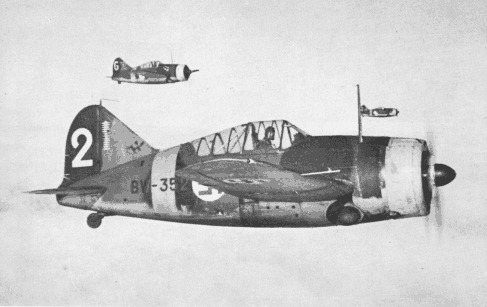
Brewster 239

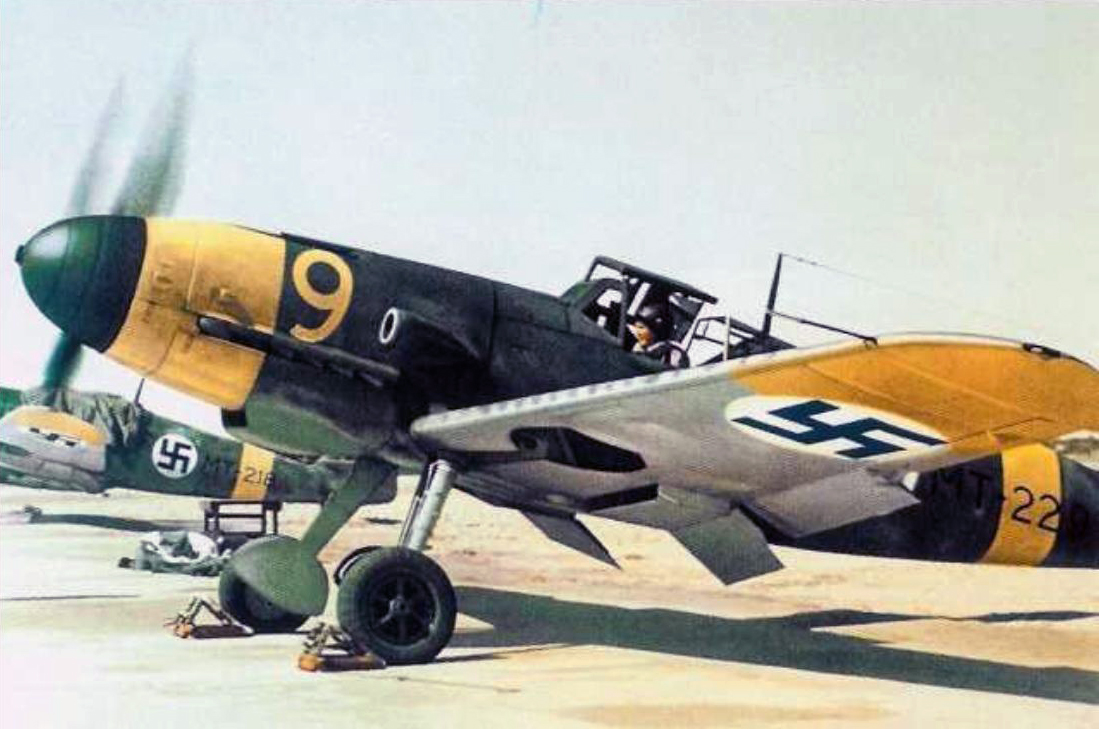
Messerschmitt Bf 109G-2.

=== Foundation ===
The Finnish Air Force was re-organized on July 15, 1933. As a result of a political decision, more aircraft bases were built and new units were formed. Among these were No. 24 Sqn, which was located to Utti, north of Kotka and close to the Karelian Isthmus. No. 24 Sqn was equipped with British Gloster Gamecock III fighters, that had been license-manufactured in Finland. The first unit commander, Richard Lorenz, developed a new fighter tactic, based on aircraft pairs, instead of the three-aircraft groups that were standard of the day. It is possible that the Finnish Air Force was the first air force to introduce this system as a tactical formation, later to be immortalized by Luftwaffe, and a standard today. The squadron was equipped with Dutch Fokker D.XXI fighters in 1937.

=== Winter War ===
The unit was still equipped with Fokker D.XXIs when the Soviet Union attacked Finland on November 30, 1939. Violent bomb raids on Helsinki claimed more than 300 lives on the very first day of the war. The Fokker fighters were considered inferior to the Soviet equivalents, such as the Polikarpov I-16 and the Polikarpov I-153, which were the most common aircraft of the Soviet Air Force. The Finnish fighters were ordered to concentrate on the enemy's bombers in order to avoid unnecessary losses. The first victory was won on 1 December, when 11 Soviet SB bombers were downed. The first loss was attributed a blue-on-blue incident, when the Finnish anti-aircraft defences downed a fighter. Bad weather stopped air operations several times during the war, but the squadron downed 12 enemy aircraft on December 19, including two I-16 fighters. The total claimed tally for December 1939 was 54 aircraft shot down against one lost and one damaged own aircraft. These successes came at the same time as the Finnish Army stopped the Soviet advances on all fronts.

Jorma Sarvanto became not only the squadron's top ace, but also overall ace of the Finnish Air Force, when he downed six Ilyushin DB-3 bombers in only four minutes. The tally for January was 34 downed aircraft for one lost in battle. The squadron operative strength was down to 28 aircraft.

The Soviet fighter tactics was changed by the end of January. Drop tanks were introduced and the Soviet pilots became more aggressive. Soviet fighters could now escort bombers far inland and sometimes whole swarms of fighters (up to 40-60 fighters) could make patrols far inland.

A new Soviet land offensive was set in motion on February 1, with the goal to breach the Mannerheim line on the Karelian Isthmus. No. 24 Sqn patrolled the front lines to try to protect the troops on the ground. The squadron flew sometimes as many as 88 sorties a day in February. The increased activity and work load was also noted in the losses. Among the deaths were two Danish fighter pilot volunteers. No. 24 Sqn lost six aircraft and claimed 27 enemy aircraft. The squadron strength was now down to 22 operational aircraft.

During March, the weight of the ground operations was moved to the Bay of Vyborg, where the Red Army tried to cross the ice to southern Finland. The whole Finnish Air Force was ordered to try to stop the Soviet offensive. No. 24 Sqn flew 154 missions against the Soviet troop movements on the ice. A cease-fire was signed on March 13. No 24 sqn had started the war with 36 fighters and were left with 22. The unit claimed 120 aircraft downed (of which 100 were bombers). Own losses amounted to 11 aircraft, of who 9 had been lost to the enemy.

==== Fighter aces of the No. 24 Sqn during the Winter War ====
- Jorma Sarvanto, 13 victories
- Viktor Pyötsiä, 7.5 victories
- Tatu Huhanantti, 6 victories (shot down and killed on February 29, 1940)
- Per-Erik Sovelius, 5.5 Victories

=== The Interim Peace ===
The squadron was re-equipped with US-made Brewster 239 fighters on April 19, 1940. This aircraft was considered to be the best fighter aircraft of the Finnish Air Force at the time. The unit itself was moved to the new base at Vesivehmaa, east of Lahti. The situation between the Soviet Union and Finland was very tense and many believed that it was only a matter of time until the war erupted again. During the 14 months that the peace lasted, the pilots of No. 24 Sqn trained hard, so that they would be ready to take on the enemy again. A ground-based early-warning system was developed and introduced to give warning of enemy aircraft at an earlier stage.

=== The Continuation War ===
==== 1941 ====
At the beginning of the war, the squadron was equipped with 34 Brewster fighters. The Finnish Air Force consisted of 235 aircraft, of whom 187 were immediately ready. 179 of these were fighters. Against them were 1,332 aircraft from the Leningrad Military Area, 400 aircraft from the Soviet Baltic Red Fleet and 114 aircraft from the Soviet Arctic Red Fleet. The Finnish aircraft were marked with a yellow band, similar to German aircraft, to more easily distinguish them from the opponents' aircraft.

About 150 Soviet aircraft attacked several Finnish cities on June 25, 1941. This started the Continuation War. During the first day, No 24 Sqn downed 10 enemy bombers, without own losses. The unit protected southern Finland between June 25–30 and managed to shoot down 17 enemy aircraft, among these were two MBR-2 amphibious aircraft and one PE-1. One Brewster was lost in an accident.

The squadron was relocated to Rantasalmi AFB on July 3. Their mission was to support the Karelian Army's operations, together with the entire 2nd Air Regiment, the reconnaissance squadrons 12 and 16, as well as Bristol Blenheim bombers from the 4th Air Regiment. Soviet reconnaissance discovered the Finnish troop concentrations and began a series of attacks on these on July 8. The No 24 Sqn downed 11 enemy aircraft without own losses. The unit continued with its support operations during the summer of 1941. By the end of 1941, the No 24 Sqn could claim 135 victories against and only two losses to the enemy (one to enemy anti-aircraft fire and one in an accident). The Finnish Air Force total tally was 356 enemy aircraft downed and 84 lost in battle and in accidents. No 24 Sqn was now the most successful fighter unit of the Finnish Air Force.

==== 1942 ====
After the Finnish Army had reached its operational goals by the end of December 1941, the war changed. It now took more a form of trench warfare. At the same time, the Soviet Air Force was being re-equipped with new fighters, many coming as lend-lease from the United Kingdom. Fighters such as Hawker Hurricane IIA and IIB began appearing over the Finnish front. No. 14 Sqn, which was equipped with Fokker D.XXIs, and who was located in northern Karelia faced increasing difficulties against the more modern Soviet fighters. The second group of the 24th Sqn was ordered to reinforce the defence at Tiksjärvi. Here they met Soviet MiG-3s and Hurricanes and also suffered their first losses to Soviet fighters (three Brewsters were shot down), but they also shot down at least eight enemy aircraft.

The Battle of Hogland was fought late in the winter of 1942. No 24 Sqn supported the operations with six fighters. The fighter ace Ilmari Juutilainen managed to down two enemy aircraft. Juutilainen had now 20 victories and was rewarded with the Mannerheim Cross, the first pilot to be given the distinction in the unit. The Finns conquered the island after a successful operation. During the remainder of the year, the unit provided air defence from the Gulf of Finland up to northern Karelia. Jorma Karhunen was awarded with the Mannerheim Cross on September 8.

The Soviet Air Force operated now better fighters, such as the LaGG-3, La-5, Il-2 Sturmovik, Yak-1, and Yak-7.

==== 1943 ====
In the beginning of 1943, the unit was down to 24 operational Brewster fighters. At the same time, a new unit was formed. No. 34 Sqn was formed to incorporate the new Messerschmitt Bf 109 fighters. It also recruited the best pilots from other units, among them many of No. 24 Sqn's best pilots, i.e. Ilmari Juutilainen and Jorma Lukkanen, who had 34 and 14.5 victories respectively. The Soviet Air Force was continuously modernized. The No. 24 Sqn participated among other in the defence of the Gulf of Finland, where they met the aircraft of the Soviet Baltic Fleet, who recently had mounted an offensive. Captain Hans Wind received the Mannerheim Cross on July 31, when he reached 31 victories.

==== 1944 ====
In early 1944 the unit received the "fighter" prefix to its name and only 17 Brewsters remained operational. The successful aircraft, with a 30:1 victory ratio was replaced with Bf 109s. The unit was fully re-equipped by May 1944 and operated 14 Bf 109Gs when the Soviet Great Offensive started.

==== The Soviet Great Offensive ====
The Soviet land, air and naval forces launched a coordinated attack on Finland on June 9, 1944. More than 1,500 Soviet aircraft were concentrated against the Finns in the immediate area. The Soviet strategic bomber command, ADD, also supported the operations. The Finnish Air Force could muster 16 Bf 109s in No. 34 Sqn, 18 Brewsters in No. 26 Sqn and 14 Bf 109s in the No. 24 Sqn. The No. 24 Sqn was based at Suulajärvi on the Southern Karelian Isthmus.

The No.24 Sqn was first tasked with reconnaissance, trying to find out how far the Soviet forces had advanced into Finnish territory. The largest activity in the air was on June 14, 1944, during the battles of Siiranmäki and Kuuterselkä. The enemy gathered some 1,700 aircraft for the battle. On June 15, the No 24 Sqn was moved further northwest, to the airport at Lappeenranta. The unit was hardly struck on June 17, when lieutenant Nissinen (32.5 victories) and lieutenant Sarjamo (12.5 victories), two of its most experienced pilots were killed in action. Finland began receiving well-needed help from Germany - new Messerschmitt fighters arrived to replace losses and the German jabo unit Geschwader Kuhlmey also arrived and gave valuable assistance.

=== Results of the war ===
No. 24 Sqn had 763 confirmed kills and lost itself 30 aircraft (of whom 26 to enemy fighters). This gives a kill-ratio of 29.3 downed enemy aircraft for every own aircraft lost. Four pilots of No. 24 Sqn were awarded with the Mannerheim Cross, two of them received it twice. The unit was renamed into No. 31 Fighter Sqn on December 4, 1944. The unit is still active and flies F-18s today.

=== Unit commanders ===
- Major Richard Lorenz, July 15, 1933 - November 21, 1938
- LtCol Gustav Erik Magnusson, November 21, 1938 - December 4, 1944
- Major Jorma Karhunen, December 4, 1944

== Organization ==
=== Winter War ===
- 1st Flight (1. Lentue) - Six Fokker D.XXI
- 2nd Flight (2. Lentue) - Six Fokker D.XXI
  - Detachment Vuorela (Osasto Vuorela)
- 3rd Flight (3. Lentue) - Six Fokker D.XXI
  - Detachment Luukkanen (Osasto Luukkanen)
- 4th Flight (4. Lentue) - Seven Fokker D.XXI
- 5th Flight (5. Lentue) - Ten Fokker D.XXI
  - Detachment Ahola (Osasto Ahola)
  - Detachment Siiräinen (Osasto Siiräinen, 1./LLv.26)
  - Detachment Kivinen (Osasto Kivinen, 2./LLv.26)

The equipment consisted of 36 Fokker D.XXIs.

=== Continuation War ===
- 1st Flight (1. Lentue) - Nine Brewsters
  - Detachment Luukkanen (Osasto Luukkanen)
- 2nd Flight (2. Lentue) - Eight Brewsters
  - Detachment Ahola (Osasto Ahola)
- 3rd Flight "Knight Flight" (3. Lentue) - Eight Brewsters
- 4th Flight (4. Lentue) - Eight Brewsters
- 1st Flight of No. 34 Squadron (1./Le. Lv.34)

The equipment consisted of 34 Brewster Buffaloes. Later during the war the unit was equipped with 29 Messerschmitt Bf 109Gs.

== Top 10 aces of No. 24 Squadron ==
- Ilmari Juutilainen: 94 victories, double Mannerheim Cross knight
- Hans Wind: 75 victories, double Mannerheim Cross knight
- Eino Luukkanen: 56 victories. Mannerheim cross winner.
- Olavi Puro: 36 victories.
- Nils Katajainen: 35.5 victories. Mannerheim cross winner.
- Lauri Nissinen: 32.5 victories. Mannerheim cross winner. Killed in action
- Kyösti Karhila: 32 victories
- Jorma Karhunen: 31 victories. Mannerheim cross winner.
- Emil Vesa: 29.5 victories.
- Tapio Järvi: 28.5 victories.

== Bibliography ==
- Keskinen, Kalevi; Stenman, Kari & Niska, Klaus (1995). Brewster Model 239. Suomen ilmavoimien historia. Vol. 1 (4th ed.). Tampere, Finland: Apali. ISBN 952-5026-02-7.
- Keskinen, Kalevi; Stenman, Kari (2000) [1974]. Fokker D. XXI (Mercury). Suomen ilmavoimien historia (in Finnish). Vol. 3A. Helsinki: Hobby-Kustannus Oy. ISBN 952-5334-02-3.
- Keskinen, Kalevi; Stenman, Kari (2000) [1974]. Fokker D. XXI (Wasp). Suomen ilmavoimien historia (in Finnish). Vol. 3B. Helsinki: Hobby-Kustannus Oy. ISBN 952-5334-03-1.
- Keskinen, Kalevi; Stenman, Kari and Niska, Klaus. Hävittäjä-Ässät-Finnish Fighter Aces (Suomen Ilmavoimien Historia 11) (in Finnish with English summary). Espoo, Finland: Tietoteos, 1978. ISBN 951-9035-37-0
- Shores, Christopher F. (1969). Finnish Air Force 1918–1968. Aircam Aviation Series. Vol. S2. Canterbury, UK: Osprey Publications. ISBN 0-85045-012-8.
- Stenman, Kari and Keskinen, Kalevi. Finnish Aces of World War 2. Botley, UK: Osprey Publishing, 1998. ISBN 1-85532-783-X
- Stenman, Kari and Weal, John. Lentolaivue 24. Botley, UK: Osprey Publishing, 2001. ISBN 1-84176-262-8
