= List of units of the Finnish Air Force during the Winter War =

This is a list of units of the Finnish Air Force during the Winter War:

== Flying Regiment 1 ==
- Lentolaivue 10
- Lentolaivue 12
- Lentolaivue 14
- Lentolaivue 16

== Flying Regiment 2 ==
- Lentolaivue 22
- Lentolaivue 24
- Lentolaivue 26
- Lentolaivue 28

== Flying Regiment 4 ==
- Lentolaivue 42
- Lentolaivue 44
- Lentolaivue 46
- Lentolaivue 48

== F 19 ==
- F 19

== Replenishment Regiment 1 ==
- Koulutuslaivue 1

== Replenishment Regiment 2 ==
- Lentolaivue 29

== Replenishment Regiment 4 ==
- Koulutuslaivue 4

== Navy HQ ==
- Lentolaivue 36
- Täydennyslentolaivue 39

== Others ==
- Ilmasotakoulu
- Lentovarikko

== See also ==
- List of units of the Finnish Air Force during the Continuation War
- Aerial warfare in the Winter War
