= List of units of the Finnish Air Force during the Continuation War =

This is a list of units of the Finnish Air Force during the Continuation War:

== Flying Regiment 1 ==
- Tiedustelulentolaivue 12
- Hävittäjälentolaivue 32

== Flying Regiment 2 ==
- Tiedustelulentolaivue 16
- Hävittäjälentolaivue 28

== Flying Regiment 3 ==
- Hävittäjälentolaivue 24
- Hävittäjälentolaivue 26
- Hävittäjälentolaivue 34

== Flying Regiment 4 ==
- Pommituslentolaivue 42
- Pommituslentolaivue 44
- Pommituslentolaivue 46
- Pommituslentolaivue 48

== Flying Regiment 5 ==
- Tiedustelulentolaivue 14
- Pommituslentolaivue 6
- Hävittäjälentolaivue 30

== Other units ==
- Täydennyslentolaivue 17
- Täydennyslentolaivue 35
- Ilmasotakoulu
- Koelentolaivue
- Koelaivue
- Lentovarikko 1
- Lentovarikko 2

== See also ==
- List of units of the Finnish Air Force during the Winter War
