= Flying Regiment 1, Finnish Air Force =

- Active: 1 January 1938 - June 1941; 3 May 1942 - 1 December 1952
- Country: Finland
- Branch: Finnish Air Force
- Role: reconnaissance and ground attack
- Engagements: Winter War, Continuation War

Flying Regiment 1 (Finnish: Lentorykmentti 1 or LeR 1) was a mixed regiment, incorporating both fighter, reconnaissance and communication squadrons, of the Finnish Air Force during World War II. The unit was disbanded in June 1941, but reformed from the Supplement Flying Regiment on May 3, 1942.

After its deactivation it was formed int No. 2 Wing (Finnish: 2. Lennosto).

== Organization ==
=== Winter War ===
- No. 10 Squadron: dive bomber squadron
- No. 12 Squadron: reconnaissance squadron
- No. 14 Squadron: reconnaissance squadron
- No. 16 Squadron: reconnaissance squadron

=== Continuation War ===
- No. 12 Squadron: reconnaissance squadron
- No. 32 Squadron: fighter squadron

==== Maintenance companies ====
- 1st Airfield Company (1. Lentokenttäkomppania or 1.Le.KenttäK)
- 2nd Airfield Company (2. Lentokenttäkomppania or 2.Le.KenttäK)

The equipment consisted of some 200-240 aircraft, including Curtiss Hawk 75As, Fokker D.XXIs, Morane-Saulnier MS.406s, Gloster Gladiator IIs, Arado 196s, Curtiss P-40M, LaGG-3, Fokker C.Xs, Westland Lysanders, VL Viima IIs, VL Myrsky IIs, Blackburn Ripon IIFs, and Bristol Blenheim Mk.Is.

== Bibliography ==
- Keskinen, Kalevi; Stenman, Kari (2002). LeR 1: Lentolaivue 10, Lentolaivue 12, Lentolaivue 14, Lentolaivue 16, Lentolaivue 32. Suomen ilmavoimien historia. Vol. 20. Espoo, Finland: Kari Stenman. ISBN 951-98751-3-1.
- Shores, Christopher F. (1969). Finnish Air Force 1918–1968. Aircam Aviation Series. Vol. S2. Canterbury, UK: Osprey Publications. ISBN 0-85045-012-8.
