= List of Gloster Gladiator operators =

The following are operators of the Gloster Gladiator.

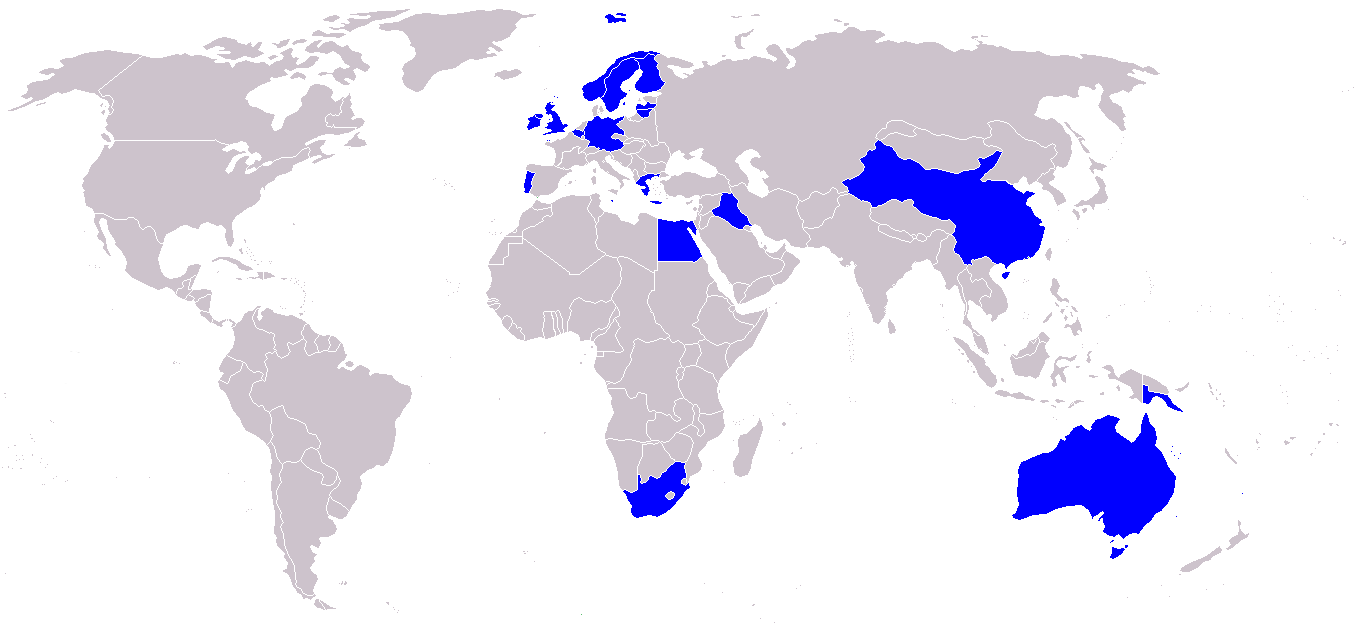
Operators of the Gladiator and Sea Gladiator

== Operators ==
=== Australia ===
Royal Australian Air Force

- No. 3 Squadron RAAF

=== Belgium ===
Belgium received 16 Mk I aircraft (G15-G30) and an additional eight were built at SABCA (G31-G38) According to other sources 22 aircraft were ordered, 15 of which were delivered carrying the serials G5-1 to G5-15, the remaining seven were assembled by SABCA. The 'G' serials mentioned by Spencer (but then only the range G-17 to G-38) would have been applied later, while in service.

Belgian Army Aviation

- 1st Escadrille de Chasse 'La Comète'

=== China ===
China received 36 Mk I aircraft in January 1938, given the Chinese serial numbers 5701-5736. They served until December 1939, when the last aircraft was shot down.

Chinese Nationalist Air Force

- No. 28 Pursuit Squadron
- No. 29 Pursuit Squadron
- No. 32 Pursuit Squadron

=== Egypt ===
Egypt received over 40 Mk II aircraft.

Royal Egyptian Air Force

- No. 2 Squadron
- No. 5 Squadron

=== Finland ===
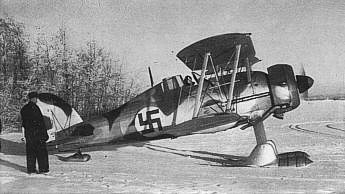
Swedish Voluntary Air Force Gladiator fighter from the air squadron F 19

Finland received 30 Mk.IIs from the UK during the Winter War, plus an additional 12 Mk.Is from Sweden after the Winter War.

Finnish Air Force

- F.19 The Swedish Volunteer Unit Flygflottilj 19
- LeLv 12
- LeLv 14
- LeLv 16
- LeLv 26

=== Free France ===
Free French Air Force

- Free French Flight 'Alsace'

=== Germany ===
The Third Reich captured at least 15 airworthy Mk Is.

Luftwaffe

=== Greece ===
Greece received 19 Mk I and 6 Mk II aircraft. The first two Mk I aircraft were bought by M. Zarparkis Hoimogenos (for £9,200) for presentation to the Royal Hellenic Air Force in 1938. They carried the serial numbers Delta Epsilon 1 and 2. The later 17 obtained Mk I aircraft retained their RAF serials, as did the six Mk IIs. Most of them were eventually destroyed by enemy air attack at Paramytia or at Amphiklia the next day.

Hellenic Royal Air Force

- No. 21 Mira

=== Iraq ===
Iraq received 24 Mk I and 5 Mk II aircraft. The initial 15 purchased Mk I aircraft bore the Iraqi serial numbers 80 to 94. Two of the Mk II aircraft were still in use in 1949 at Mosul, the last finally withdrawn in 1951.

Royal Iraqi Air Force

- No. 4 Squadron RoIAF

=== Ireland ===
Ireland received 4 Mk I aircraft. The aircraft received the Irish serial numbers 23 to 26. The last surviving aircraft was 24, which crashed in January 1944, while 26 spent most of its life in the repair shop after a landing accident.

Irish Air Corps

- No. 1 Army Co-operation Squadron

=== Latvia ===
Latvia received 26 Mk I aircraft.

Latvian Air Force

- 123 Eskadrile Armijas Aviacija sporting the numbers 114 to 126.
- 124 Eskadrile Armijas Aviacija sporting the numbers 163 to 175.

=== Lithuania ===
Lithuania received 14 Mk I aircraft, bearing the serial numbers G-704 to G-717. Twelve of them fell in Soviet hands when the Soviet Union invaded Lithuania in June 1940, at least one of them later fell in German hands when Germany invaded the by then former Lithuania in June 1941.

Lithuanian Air Force

- No. 5 Eskadra Karo Aviacija

=== Norway ===
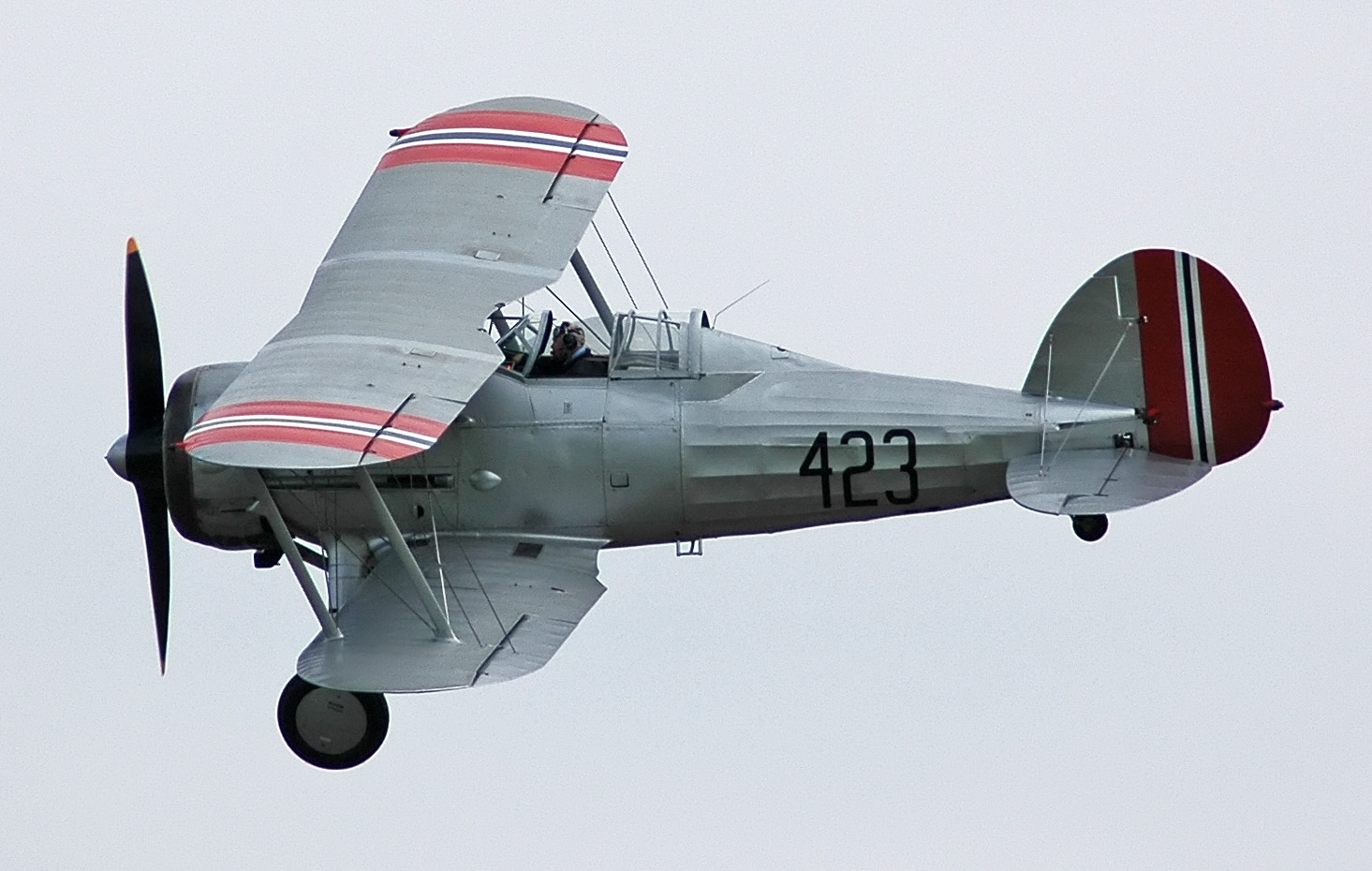
Gladiator in pre-Second World War RNoAF colours

Norway received six Mk I and six Mk II aircraft from the UK in 1938-39.

Royal Norwegian Air Force

- Jagevingen of the Norwegian Army Air Service

=== Portugal ===
Portugal received 15 Mark I and 15 Mk II aircraft for its Arma da Aeronáutica Militar (Army Military Aviation), the aircraft delivered in two batches of 15. They received the Portuguese serial numbers 450-464 and 465-479 respectively. The Gladiators served until 1953 with the Força Aérea Portuguesa (Portuguese Air Force) as it was by then called.

Portuguese Air Force

- Esquadrilha Expedicionária de Caça nº1 (Expeditionary Fighter Squadron No. 1), based at Rabo de Peixe.
- Esquadrilha Expedicionária de Caça nº2 (Expeditionary Fighter Squadron No. 2 of Azores), first based at Achada and later at Lajes.
- Esquadrilha de Caça (Fighter Squadron), based at Ota.

=== South Africa ===
South Africa received 12 Mk II and 11 Mk I ex-RAF aircraft.

South African Air Force

- No. 1 Squadron SAAF
- No. 2 Squadron SAAF
- No. 3 Squadron SAAF

=== Soviet Union ===
The Soviet Union captured 32 Latvian and Lithuanian Mk. Is aircraft.

Soviet Air Force

=== Sweden ===
Sweden received 37 Mk I (designated J-8) and 18 Mk II (designated J8A) aircraft. The 37 Mk Is were built new from 1927-1938 and were fitted with NOHAB built Bristol Mercury VIS2 engines. The 12 Mk IIs were built new in 1938 and were fitted with NOHAB built Bristol Mercury VIIIS.3 engines. The Gladiators were in action from January 1940 against Soviet attacks on Finland and some were fitted with ski landing gear and underwing bomb-racks for eight lightweight bombs.

Swedish Air Force

- Flygflottilj 8
- Flygflottilj 10
- Flygflottilj 19

=== United Kingdom ===
Royal Air Force

- No. 1 Squadron RAF
- No. 3 Squadron RAF
- No. 6 Squadron RAF
- No. 14 Squadron RAF
- No. 25 Squadron RAF
- No. 33 Squadron RAF
- No. 46 Squadron RAF
- No. 54 Squadron RAF
- No. 56 Squadron RAF
- No. 65 Squadron RAF
- No. 72 Squadron RAF
- No. 73 Squadron RAF
- No. 74 Squadron RAF
- No. 80 Squadron RAF
- No. 85 Squadron RAF
- No. 87 Squadron RAF
- No. 94 Squadron RAF
- No. 112 Squadron RAF
- No. 117 Squadron RAF
- No. 123 Squadron RAF
- No. 127 Squadron RAF
- No. 141 Squadron RAF
- No. 152 Squadron RAF
- No. 237 "Rhodesia" Squadron RAF
- No. 239 Squadron RAF
- No. 247 Squadron RAF
- No. 261 Squadron RAF
- No. 263 Squadron RAF
- No. 267 Squadron RAF
- No. 274 Squadron RAF
- No. 520 Squadron RAF
- No. 521 Squadron RAF
- No. 602 Squadron RAF
- No. 603 Squadron RAF
- No. 604 Squadron RAF
- No. 605 Squadron RAF
- No. 607 Squadron RAF
- No. 615 Squadron RAF

- No. 401 (Meteorological) Flight RAF
- No. 1401 (Meteorological) Flight RAF
- No. 402 (Meteorological) Flight RAF
- No. 1402 (Meteorological) Flight RAF
- No. 1403 (Meteorological) Flight RAF
- No. 1411 (Meteorological) Flight RAF
- No. 1412 (Meteorological) Flight RAF
- No. 1413 (Meteorological) Flight RAF
- No. 1414 (Meteorological) Flight RAF
- No. 1415 (Meteorological) Flight RAF
- No. 1560 (Meteorological) Flight RAF
- No. 1561 (Meteorological) Flight RAF
- No. 1562 (Meteorological) Flight RAF
- No. 1563 (Meteorological) Flight RAF
- No. 1565 (Meteorological) Flight RAF
- No. 1622 (Anti-Aircraft Co-operation) Flight RAF
- No. 1624 (Anti-Aircraft Co-operation) Flight RAF
- No. 1 School of Army Co-operation RAF
- No. 2 Flying Training School RAF (FTS)
- No. 3 Flying Training School RAF (FTS)
- No. 4 Flying Training School RAF (FTS)
- No. 5 Flying Training School RAF (FTS)
- No. 6 Flying Training School RAF (FTS)
- No. 7 Flying Training School RAF (FTS)
- No. 9 Flying Training School RAF (FTS)
- No. 10 Flying Training School RAF (FTS)
- No. 5 Operational Training Unit RAF (OTU)
- No. 6 Operational Training Unit RAF (OTU)
- No. 8 Operational Training Unit RAF (OTU)
- No. 41 Operational Training Unit RAF (OTU)
- No. 60 Operational Training Unit RAF (OTU)
- No. 61 Operational Training Unit RAF (OTU)

Fleet Air Arm

- 759 Naval Air Squadron
- 760 Naval Air Squadron
- 767 Naval Air Squadron
- 769 Naval Air Squadron
- 770 Naval Air Squadron
- 771 Naval Air Squadron
- 774 Naval Air Squadron
- 775 Naval Air Squadron
- 776 Naval Air Squadron
- 778 Naval Air Squadron
- 787 Naval Air Squadron
- 791 Naval Air Squadron
- 792 Naval Air Squadron
- 797 Naval Air Squadron
- 800 Naval Air Squadron
- 801 Naval Air Squadron
- 802 Naval Air Squadron
- 804 Naval Air Squadron
- 805 Naval Air Squadron
- 806 Naval Air Squadron
- 813 Naval Air Squadron
- 880 Naval Air Squadron
- 885 Naval Air Squadron

== See also ==
- Gloster Gladiator
