= List of Westland Lysander operators =

The following are units which operated the Westland Lysander. In some cases, the Lysander was used in a secondary role for communications and was not the main equipment of the squadron.

== Military operators ==
=== Australia ===
Royal Australian Air Force

- No. 3 Squadron RAAF
- No. 451 Squadron RAAF

=== British India ===
Royal Indian Air Force

- No. 1 Squadron, Indian Air Force
- No. 2 Squadron, Indian Air Force
- No. 4 Squadron, Indian Air Force
- No. 104 (GR) Squadron, Indian Air Force
- No. 1 Air Gunnery School (India)
- No. 22 AACU

=== Burma ===
Burma Volunteer Air Force

=== Canada ===
Royal Canadian Air Force

- No. 2 Squadron RCAF
- No. 110 Squadron RCAF
- No. 111 Squadron RCAF
- No. 112 Squadron RCAF
- No. 118 Squadron RCAF
- No. 121 Squadron RCAF
- No. 122 Squadron RCAF
- No. 123 Squadron RCAF
- No. 400 Squadron RCAF
- No. 414 Squadron RCAF

=== Egypt ===
Royal Egyptian Air Force

- No. 1 (Army Cooperation) Squadron - 19 Mark I and a Mark III. From 1940-1943, thereafter used for target towing.

=== Finland ===
Finnish Air Force

- No. 12 Squadron, Finnish Air Force
- No. 14 Squadron, Finnish Air Force
- No. 16 Squadron, Finnish Air Force

=== Free France ===
Free French Air Force

=== Ireland ===
Irish Air Corps
6 supplied in 1939

=== Poland ===
Polish Air Force in Great Britain

- No. 309 "Land of Czerwien" Polish Fighter-Reconnaissance Squadron

=== Portugal ===
Portugal Air Force

=== South Africa ===
South African Air Force

=== Turkey ===
Turkish Air Force
36 Mark II supplied in 1939

=== United Kingdom ===
Royal Air Force

- No. 2 Squadron RAF
- No. 4 Squadron RAF
- No. 6 Squadron RAF
- No. 13 Squadron RAF
- No. 16 Squadron RAF
- No. 20 Squadron RAF - No. 221 Group RAF, India, 1942
- No. 24 Squadron RAF
- No. 26 Squadron RAF
- No. 28 Squadron RAF - No. 221 Group RAF, India, 1942
- No. 81 Squadron RAF
- No. 116 Squadron RAF
- No. 135 Squadron RAF
- No. 138 Squadron RAF
- No. 148 Squadron RAF
- No. 161 Squadron RAF
- No. 173 Squadron RAF
- No. 208 Squadron RAF
- No. 225 Squadron RAF
- No. 231 Squadron RAF
- No. 237 Squadron RAF
- No. 239 Squadron RAF
- No. 241 Squadron RAF
- No. 267 Squadron RAF
- No. 268 Squadron RAF
- No. 275 Squadron RAF
- No. 276 Squadron RAF
- No. 277 Squadron RAF
- No. 278 Squadron RAF
- No. 280 Squadron RAF
- No. 285 Squadron RAF
- No. 286 Squadron RAF
- No. 287 Squadron RAF
- No. 288 Squadron RAF
- No. 289 Squadron RAF
- No. 309 Polish Fighter-Reconnaissance Squadron
- No. 357 Squadron RAF - Special Duties
- No. 510 Squadron RAF
- No. 516 Squadron RAF
- No. 598 Squadron RAF
- No. 613 Squadron RAF - Auxiliary Air Force. From 2 April 1940, Westland Lysanders served alongside the squadron's Hectors. The Hectors and Lysanders were used to dive-bomb German positions and drop supplies to friendly troops near Calais during the late May 1940 Dunkirk evacuation. In August 1941 the squadron began re-equipping with the Curtiss Tomahawk.
- No. 614 Squadron RAF - Auxiliary Air Force equipped with Lysanders as main equipment.
- No. 679 Squadron RAF
- No. 695 Squadron RAF
- No. 6 Anti-Aircraft Co-operation Unit RAF
- No. 7 Anti-Aircraft Co-operation Unit RAF

Fleet Air Arm

=== United States ===
United States Army Air Forces

- 330th Bomb Squadron
- 340th Bomb Squadron
- 2025th Gunnery Flight
- 2031st Gunnery Flight
- 496th Fighter Training Group
