= Aerial warfare in the Winter War =

The aerial warfare in the Winter War was the aerial aspect of the Winter War between Finland and the Soviet Union from 30 November 1939 to 13 March 1940. While the Soviet air forces greatly outnumbered the Finnish Air Force, the Soviet bombing campaign was largely ineffective, and Finnish pilots and antiaircraft gunners inflicted significant losses on the Soviets.

== Soviet Air Force ==
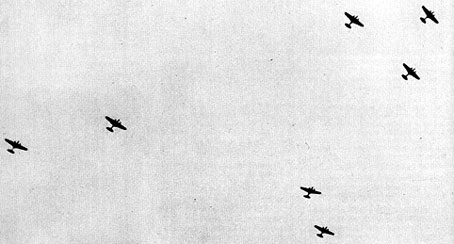
Soviet Tupolev SB bombers appear in the sky above Helsinki 30 November 1939.

The Soviet Union enjoyed air superiority throughout the war. The Soviet Air Force, supported the Red Army's invasion with about 2,500 aircraft of the Soviet Air Forces, (the most common of which was the Tupolev SB-2 bomber, which had shown its effectiveness during the Spanish Civil War. However the VVS was not as effective as the Soviets might have hoped. The material damage by bomber attacks was slight, as Finland did not offer many valuable targets for strategic bombing. Targets were often small village depots of small value. Finland had only a few modern highways, so the railway systems were the main target for bombers. The rail tracks were cut thousands of times but were easily repaired, and the Finns usually had trains running in a matter of hours. The damage inflicted on Finnish targets was also diminished by poor navigation technique, and minimal bombing accuracy on the part of the Soviets and Finnish casualties were reduced by effective air-raid precautions. However the Soviet air force learned from its early mistakes, and by late February they instituted more effective tactics. One such success was the strike against the Ruokolahti airfield on 29 February 1940. At noon on that day 40 I-16 and I-153 fighters struck the base, destroying three aircraft on the ground and another three (two Gladiators and one Fokker) for the loss of only one I-16.

Finland's capital city, Helsinki, was bombed on the first day of the war; a number of buildings were destroyed and some 200 people were killed. However the city was the target of raids only a few times thereafter. All in all, Finland lost only 5 percent of its total man-hour production time due to Soviet bombings. Nevertheless, bombings affected thousands of civilians as the Soviets launched 2,075 bombing attacks on 516 localities. Air raids killed 957 Finnish civilians. The city of Viipuri, a major Soviet objective, was almost leveled by nearly 12,000 bombs. No attacks on civilian targets were mentioned in Soviet radio or newspaper reports. In January 1940, Pravda continued to stress that no civilian targets in Finland had been struck, even by accident.

=== Soviet aircraft ===
At the start of hostilities the Soviet Air Force had the following aircraft in service:

Fighters

- I-15: biplane fighter (Chaika-"seagull")
- I-15 bis : (improved version of I-15)
- I-16 monoplane fighter (Ishak-"donkey"; called Siipiorava, "flying squirrel" by the Finns)
- I-16 bis
- I-153 biplane fighter (also called the Chaika; a variant of the I-15)

Bombers

- DB-3 twin engined long-range bomber
- SB-2 twin engined high-speed bomber (Katyusha- "Catherine")
- SB-2 bis
- TB-3 four-engined heavy bomber

Reconnaissance

- Po-2 multi-purpose biplane (kukuruznik-"crop-duster")

Naval aviation

- MBR-2 multi-purpose flying boat
- MBR2 bis

Figures of Soviet losses during the conflict vary from source to source; One estimate puts the loss at 700–900 aircraft, the majority of them bombers: Against this Finnish losses were 62 aircraft, with a further 59 damaged beyond repair. Another states Finnish aircraft shot down 240 Soviet aircraft, with anti-aircraft fire accounting for 314 to 444 others.

== Finnish Air Force ==
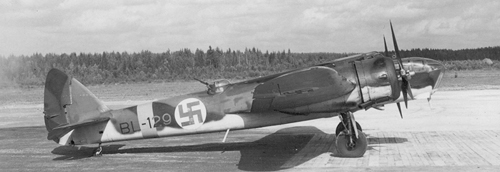
The Finns ordered 18 British Bristol Blenheim light bombers in 1936

At the beginning of the war, Finland had a very small air force, with only 114 combat airplanes fit for duty. Therefore, Finnish air missions were very limited and fighter aircraft were mainly used to repel Soviet bombers. Old-fashioned and few in numbers, Finnish aircraft could not offer support to the Finnish ground troops. Therefore, the Finnish Air Force adopted the same guerilla tactics used by Finnish ground forces, dispersing to makeshift airfields often consisting only of a frozen lake. In spite of aircraft losses throughout the war, the Finnish Air Force grew by 50 percent by the end of the war. Most new aircraft shipments arrived during January 1940.

The Finnish Air Force had also revised its tactics; In air combat, the Finns used the more flexible "finger four" formation (four planes split into two pairs, one flying low and the other high, with each plane fighting independently of the others, yet supporting its wingman in combat), which was superior to the Soviet tactic of three fighters flying in a Vic formation. This formation and the credo of Finnish pilots to always attack, no matter the odds, contributed to the failure of Soviet bombers to inflict substantial damage against Finnish positions and population centres.

Finnish fighter pilots often dove into Soviet formations that outnumbered them ten or even twenty times, and Soviet bomber formations became wary of even single Finnish fighters, as they knew the pilot would not let them pass un-noticed. Entire squadrons could disappear on missions over Finland, and those back at their bases in Estonia could only guess at what had happened. On one occasion, the Finnish ace Jorma Kalevi Sarvanto encountered a formation of seven DB-3 bombers on 6 January 1940 and shot down six in just 4 minutes.

=== Finnish aircraft ===
At the start of hostilities, the Finnish Air Force had 146 aircraft of all types at its disposal, organized into 12 squadrons. The primary fighter aircraft were

- 15 Bristol Bulldog IVs, which had entered service in 1935,
- 41 of the more modern Fokker D.XXI
- 65 older Fokker aircraft of various types; Fokker C.X and Fokker C.V
- 15 Blackburn Ripons

There were also 18 license-built Bristol Blenheim bombers. In 1939, an order had been placed in Italy for 25 Fiat G.50 fighters; two were being assembled in Sweden when the war broke out.

During the war, a number of aircraft were ordered from abroad:

- 30 Gloster Gladiator II biplane fighters from the United Kingdom
- 12 Bristol Blenheim IV bombers from the United Kingdom
- 30 Morane-Saulnier M.S.406 fighters from France
- 44 Brewster 239 fighters from the United States
- 24 Gloster Gauntlet trainers from South Africa
- 10 Fiat G.50 fighters from Italy
- 12 Hawker Hurricane I fighters from the United Kingdom
- 12 Westland Lysander reconnaissance planes from United Kingdom
- 2 Bristol Bulldog from Sweden
- 3 J6B Jaktfalken biplane trainers from Sweden
- 3 Fokker C.V.D reconnaissance planes from Sweden
- 2 Koolhoven F.K.52 reconnaissance planes and 1 Douglas DC-2 transport plane from Count von Rosen, Sweden
- 6 Caudron C.714 fighters from France, which never entered service in Finnish Fighter Squadrons because of their bad performance and unsuitability to operate from the short landing strips in Finland.

Also there was a Swedish volunteer squadron named Flight Regiment 19, Finnish Air Force taking care of the air defence of Northern Finland. It was equipped with 12 Gloster Gladiator II biplane fighters and 5 Hawker Hart biplane bombers.

Owing to this reinforcement, the Finnish Air Force had a greater strength at the end of the conflict than at the beginning; however they were seldom able to field more than 100 aircraft at any one time against an expanding VVS commitment.

Finnish fighters shot down 240 confirmed Soviet aircraft, against the Finnish loss of 26. A Finnish forward air base often consisted of only a frozen lake, a windsock, a telephone set and some tents. Air-raid warnings were given by Finnish women organized by the Lotta Svärd. Finnish antiaircraft gunners shot down between 314 and 444 Soviet aircraft.

== Finnish aces ==
The following Finnish pilots became aces (achieving five confirmed victories) during the war

name	confirmed	unconfirmed
Lt. Jorma Sarvanto	13	4
Lt. Tatu Huhanantti	6	4
S/M. Viktor Pyötsiä	7 ½	2
S/M Kelpo Virta	5	1
Lt. Urho Nieminen	5	1
Lt T. Vuorimaa	4	2 ½
Capt. Erkki Olavi Ehrnrooth	7	4

== See also ==
- List of units of the Finnish Air Force during the Winter War
