= Paavo Berg =

- Born: 23 November 1911; Lahti, Grand Duchy of Finland
- Died: 1 November 1941 (aged 29); Hanko, Finland
- Military career
- Allegiance: Finland
- Branch: Finnish Air Force
- Service years: 1931–1941
- Rank: Captain
- Units: LeLv 26, LeLv 32
- Awards: Freedom Cross, 4th Class

Paavo Daavid "Pate" Berg (23 November 1911 – 1 November 1941) was a Finnish fighter ace. He was the second most successful Finnish biplane fighter ace, scoring 10.5 victories (5 while flying Gloster Gladiators). The remaining 4.5 victories were with Curtiss Hawk 75s. He was shot down and killed by anti-aircraft fire on 1 November 1941.

Berg was accepted into the Cadet School in June 1931. He was promoted to lieutenant in 1935 and captain in 1940.

== Victories ==
Aircraft	Victories
Gloster Gladiator	5.5
Curtiss Hawk 75	4.5 plus one balloon
Total	9.5 plus 1 balloon
