= No. 10 Squadron (Finland) =

No. 10 Squadron Finnish Air Force
- Active: 30 November 1939 - 13 March 1940; 12 August 1941 - 30 October 1941
- Country: Finland
- Branch: Finnish Air Force
- Role: dive bombing
- Engagements: Winter War, Continuation War

No. 10 Squadron (Finnish: Lentolaivue 10 or LLv.10) was a divebomber squadron of the Finnish Air Force in World War II. The squadron was part of Flying Regiment 1.

== Organization ==
=== Winter War ===
- 1st Flight (1. Lentue)
- 2nd Flight (2. Lentue)
- 3rd Flight (3. Lentue)
- Detachment Pietarinen (Osasto Pietarinen, training detachment)

Their equipment consisted of 13 Fokker C.Xs. The No. 10 Squadron was disbanded after the Winter War and became the new No. 30 Squadron. However, it re-emerged for a couple of months in late 1941.

=== Continuation War ===
- 1st Flight (1. Lentue)
- 2nd Flight (2. Lentue)

The equipment consisted of 3 Hawker Hurricanes, 4 Fokker C.VEs, 6 Fokker D.XXIs, and 2 Blackburn Ripon IIs.

== Bibliography ==
- Keskinen, Kalevi; Stenman, Kari (2000) [1974]. Fokker D. XXI (Wasp). Suomen ilmavoimien historia (in Finnish). Vol. 3B. Helsinki: Hobby-Kustannus Oy. ISBN 952-5334-03-1.
- Shores, Christopher F. (1969). Finnish Air Force 1918–1968. Aircam Aviation Series. Vol. S2. Canterbury, UK: Osprey Publications. ISBN 0-85045-012-8.
