= No. 32 Squadron (Finland) =

- Lentolaivue 32
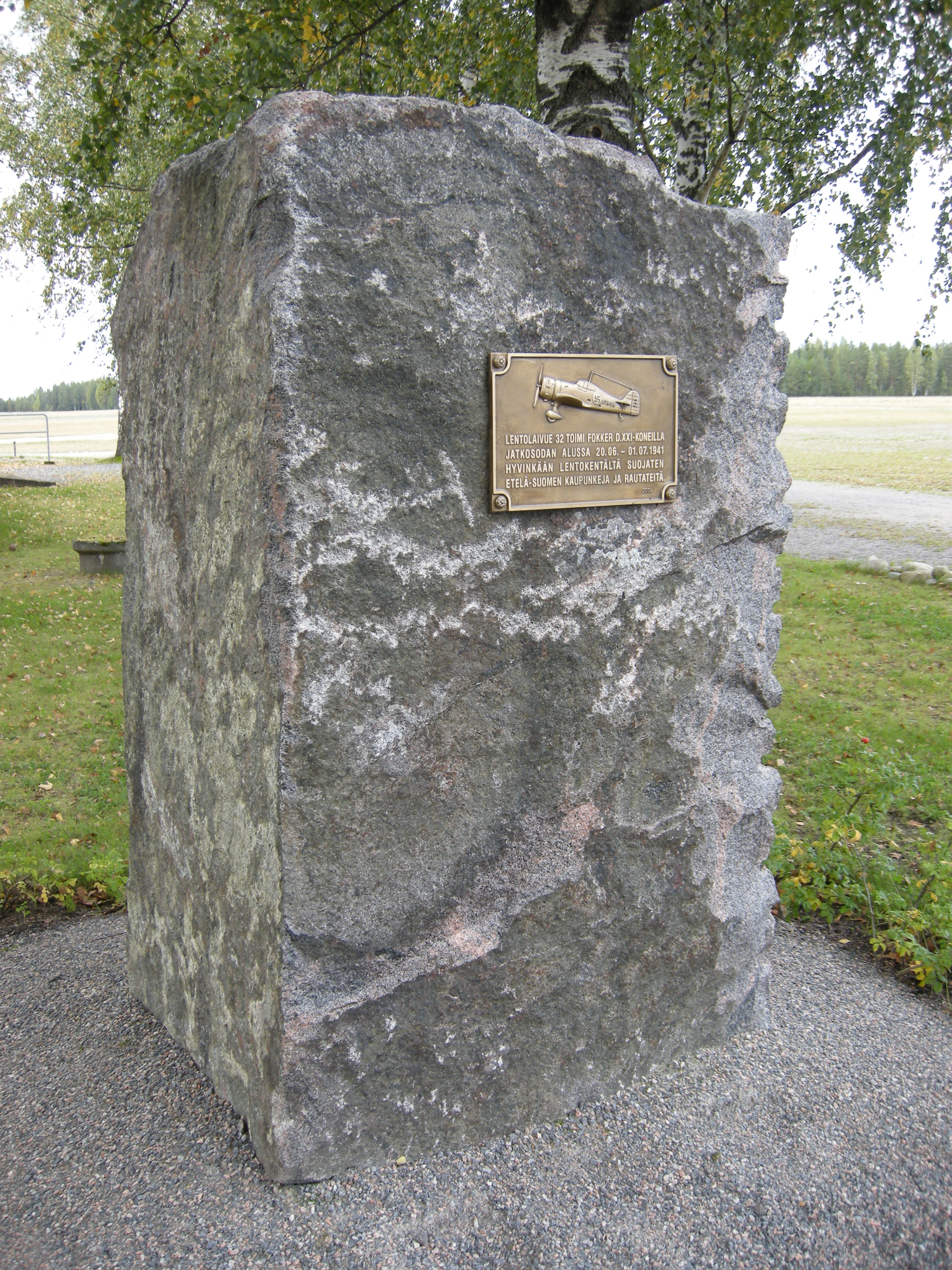
- Memorial of the squadron at Hyvinkää
- Active: 9 April 1940 – 4 December 1944
- Country: Finland
- Branch: Finnish Air Force
- Type: Fighter squadron
- Role: Fighter operations
- Part of: Flying Regiment 3 (1940–1942); Flying Regiment 1 (1942–1944)
- Equipment: Brewster B-239, Fokker D.XXI, Curtiss Hawk 75, Lavochkin LaGG-3
- Engagements: Continuation War

Commanders
- Notable commanders: Olavi Ehrnrooth

No. 32 Squadron (Finnish: Lentolaivue 32 or LLv.32, from 3 May 1942 Le.Lv.32, and from 14 February 1944 No. 32 Fighter Squadron (Hävittäjälentolaivue 32, HLeLv 32)) was a fighter squadron of the Finnish Air Force during World War II. It was formed on 9 April 1940 by renaming No. 22 Squadron, which had been established during the Winter War. During the early phase of the Continuation War, the squadron, then part of Flying Regiment 3, took part in the air defence of southern and southeastern Finland and in protecting the field army advancing on the Karelian Isthmus. After the initial offensive, it flew escort missions, including during the capture of Suursaari. In spring 1942 it was subordinated to Flying Regiment 1 and assigned to the Olonets Isthmus, where it flew interception and escort missions from Nurmoila until June 1944. After the Soviet summer offensive on the Olonets Isthmus, the squadron withdrew with the field army and flew ground-attack, reconnaissance and bomber-escort missions from several forward airfields. After the armistice it moved via Rantasalmi to Mikkeli, where it was disbanded on 4 December 1944 as the Finnish Air Force reverted to its peacetime organization. During the Continuation War, the squadron achieved 190⅓ aerial victories with Curtiss Hawk 75 fighters and 12 with other aircraft types, for a total of 202⅓ aerial victories, while losing 24 aircraft and 16 pilots.

== History ==
=== Formation ===
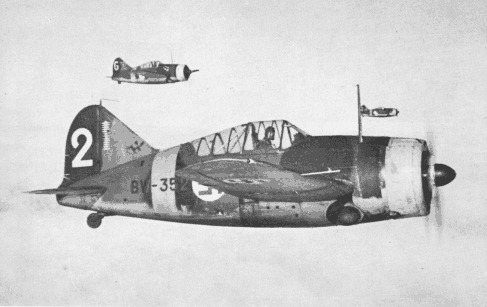
A Brewster B-239, briefly used by the squadron in spring 1940

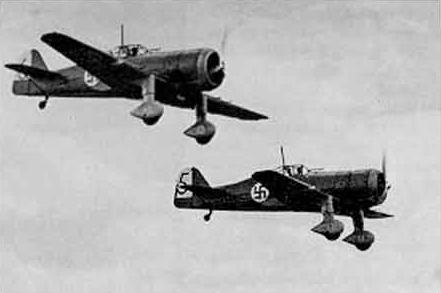
Fokker D.XXI, the squadron's main fighter in 1940–1941

No. 32 Squadron originated as No. 22 Squadron, which had been established under Flying Regiment 2 during the Winter War. After the war, on 9 April 1940, it was transferred to Flying Regiment 3 and redesignated No. 32 Squadron. Commanded by Captain Erkki Heinilä, the squadron initially received 18 Brewster B-239 fighters, but these were transferred in early May to No. 24 Squadron. In exchange, the unit received the Fokker fighters formerly operated by No. 24 Squadron. After its establishment, the squadron moved to Ruovesi, at Siikakangas airfield, where it continued training throughout the interim peace.

=== Continuation War ===
At mobilization for the Continuation War, the squadron received orders on 20 June 1941 to move to Hyvinkää, with the transfer beginning on 21 June and the last elements arriving on 25 June. At that stage, the squadron had 36 Fokker D.XXI fighters. Its main task was to protect Helsinki and the railway line from Helsinki to Riihimäki against Soviet bomber attacks. On 25 June, Lieutenant Veikko Evinen of the 1st Flight scored the squadron's first victories, and also the first victories of Flying Regiment 3, by shooting down two SB-2 bombers. Thereafter, despite numerous scramble flights, few enemy aircraft were encountered over Hyvinkää, as Soviet aircraft often turned back after spotting the dust clouds raised by scrambling Finnish fighters. On 1 July, the squadron's mission changed to protecting the field army southwest of the Vuoksi as well as the industrial areas of Lappeenranta and the Vuoksi valley. Utti was selected as the new base, and the squadron moved there via Vesivehmaa by 4 July. At the same time, it was reinforced by Detachment Kalaja, a Hawker Hurricane flight from No. 30 Squadron under Captain Heikki Kalaja. In the early hours of 11 July, two Soviet aircraft attacked Utti, destroying two and damaging four Fokkers. The following day, Captain Heinilä left to command No. 35 Squadron, and Major Olavi Ehrnrooth took command. On 13 July, the squadron surrendered its Fokkers to No. 12 Squadron and No. 14 Squadron and received Curtiss Hawk 75 fighters in return. The first victory with Curtiss equipment was scored on 16 July, when a three-aircraft Curtiss formation shot down one Polikarpov I-153 from a group of four Soviet aircraft. When the Finnish offensive on the Karelian Isthmus began, the squadron was subordinated directly to the commander of the Air Force for field army protection and moved closer to the front at Lappeenranta on 30 July. This direct subordination ended on 14 September, when the unit returned to Flying Regiment 3. On 19 September, its mission became the protection of troops on the Isthmus and the Vuoksi crossing points as well as reconnaissance, and for this reason it moved to Suulajärvi on 23 September. In October, one Curtiss flight was ordered to the Hanko area. The 1st Flight, known as Detachment H, moved to Nummela airfield on 30 October, flew several interception sorties, shot down two enemy aircraft and lost two of its own before returning to the squadron on 7 December after the Soviet evacuation of Hanko. During 1941, the squadron shot down 65 enemy aircraft and lost eight of its own.

=== Curtiss Hawk operations ===
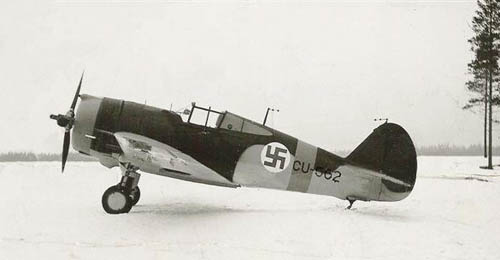
Curtiss Hawk 75A, the squadron’s principal fighter in 1941–1944

The squadron’s effectiveness increased significantly after re-equipping with Curtiss Hawk 75 fighters in July 1941. These aircraft, acquired from German stocks of captured French and Norwegian machines, proved well suited to Finnish conditions. The Curtiss Hawk was considered a major improvement over the Fokker D.XXI, offering higher speed, retractable landing gear and better overall performance. Finnish pilots regarded the aircraft as highly maneuverable and reliable in combat. In Finnish service, the Hawk was nicknamed Sussu ("Sweetheart") and became one of the most successful fighter types used by the Finnish Air Force. The Curtiss Hawk alone accounted for 190⅓ of the squadron’s 202⅓ aerial victories, making No. 32 Squadron the most effective operator of the type in Finnish service. The aircraft’s armament was progressively upgraded during the war. Early configurations with lighter machine guns proved less effective against newer Soviet aircraft, which led to the installation of heavier 12.7 mm guns alongside wing-mounted armament.

=== 1942 operations on the Olonets Isthmus ===
The beginning of 1942 was quiet on the front. The squadron encountered enemy aircraft only once, on 8 January, when a formation led by Lieutenant Pentti Nurminen shot down three Polikarpov I-152 fighters. After an unproductive interception sortie on 5 February, the squadron next took part in combat during the capture of Suursaari on 27–28 March. While protecting the occupation force, its pilots shot down 15 Soviet aircraft without losses. On 3 May 1942, as a result of an Air Force reorganization, the squadron was subordinated to the newly re-established Flying Regiment 1. On 14 May, it was assigned interception and escort duties in the Olonets Isthmus sector, with visual reconnaissance over enemy territory as an additional task. After a reconnaissance by Lieutenant Colonel Rekola and Major Ehrnrooth, Nurmoila was selected as the new base. The squadron flew its last sorties from Suulajärvi on 17 May, then moved via Immola to Nurmoila, where poor ground conditions delayed the transfer so that the last flying elements did not arrive until 30 May. During the summer of 1942, Soviet air activity was heavy and the squadron was frequently engaged in combat with new Soviet types including the fast Mikoyan-Gurevich MiG-1, Mikoyan-Gurevich MiG-3 and Petlyakov Pe-2. To intercept the Pe-2 effectively, the squadron developed a tactic based on attacking from above in a dive, since conventional pursuit was ineffective against the bomber’s superior speed. Using this method, the squadron succeeded in shooting down ten Pe-2 aircraft by the end of the year. On 5 July 1942, Soviet aircraft bombed the Nurmoila base several times with burning fuel and phosphorus, although damage remained minor. Combat activity in August was limited because of poor weather and reduced Soviet air activity. In September, however, the squadron fought several intense engagements against large enemy formations. The most notable battle took place on 5 September, when two flights fought roughly 40 Soviet fighters over the western Olonets Isthmus. In a battle lasting more than an hour, the Finns shot down 13 Soviet aircraft without losses. From October to the end of the year, poor weather again reduced flying activity.

=== 1943 ===
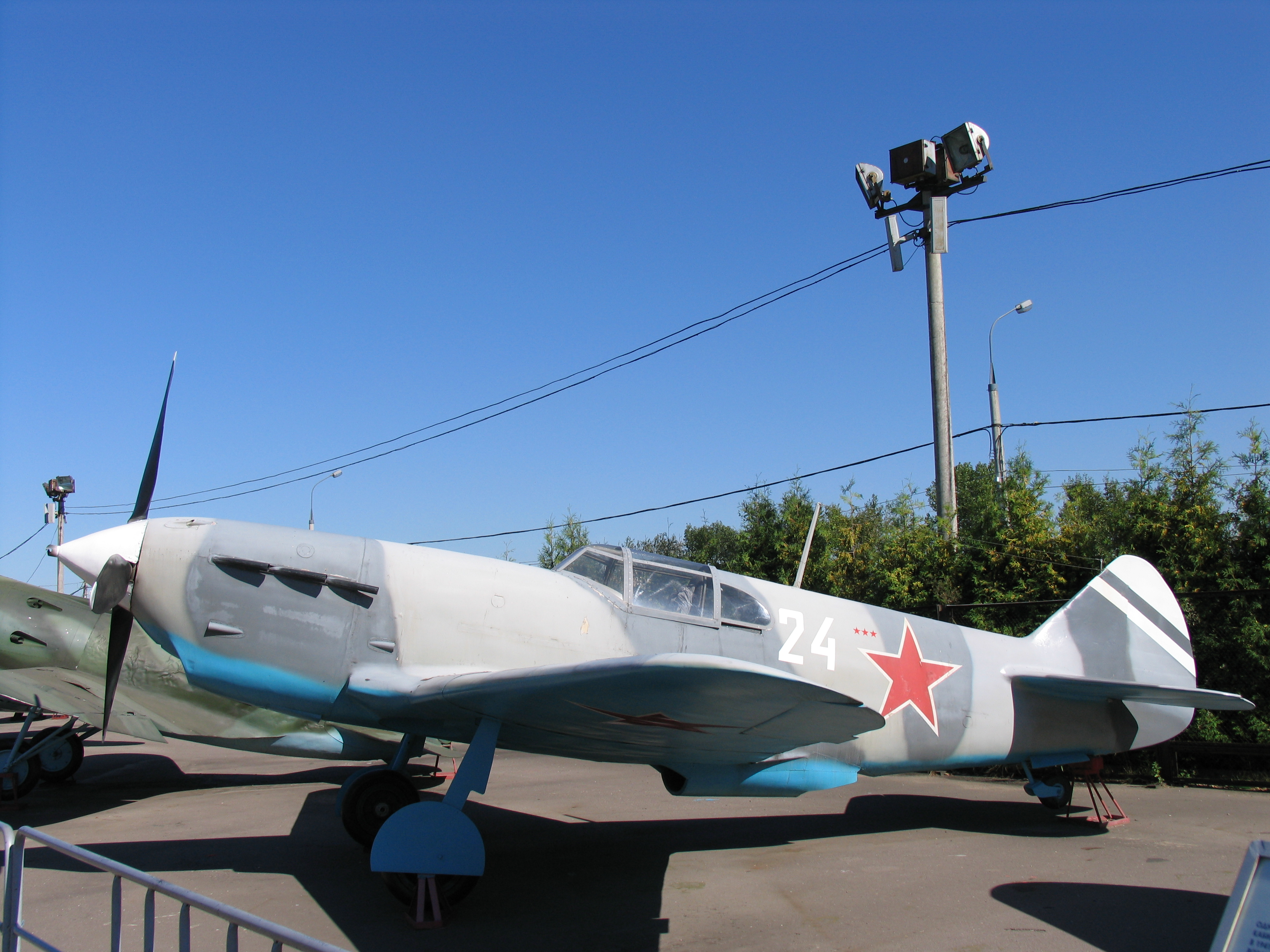
Lavochkin LaGG-3, used by the squadron in 1943–1944

At the start of 1943, daytime operations remained quiet because of the weather, although Soviet aircraft bombed Nurmoila on several nights, destroying and damaging a number of Curtiss fighters. On 20 January 1943, when Major Ehrnrooth was transferred to command the newly established No. 34 Squadron, Major Lauri Bremer became squadron commander. Fourteen experienced pilots were also transferred to No. 34 Squadron, and the new personnel received from the replacement unit led to a reorganization of the flights so that each retained a core of more experienced pilots. On 18 March 1943, the squadron received its first captured and overhauled LaGG-3 fighter, followed later by two more. These aircraft were intended to improve the squadron's ability to catch fast Pe-2 bombers, but their value was limited by repeated technical problems. At the end of March, spring thaw at Nurmoila interrupted flying until 25 April. During this period, the squadron’s six serviceable Curtiss aircraft were deployed at Immola. After an air battle on 5 May, in which the Soviets lost four aircraft, Soviet flying activity decreased. In early August, Curtiss fighters purchased from Germany in spring 1943 and overhauled by the State Aircraft Factory began arriving, improving the equipment situation so that by September the number of serviceable aircraft rose into double digits. Flying activity on both sides declined during late summer and autumn, partly because of poor weather.

=== 1944 and withdrawal ===
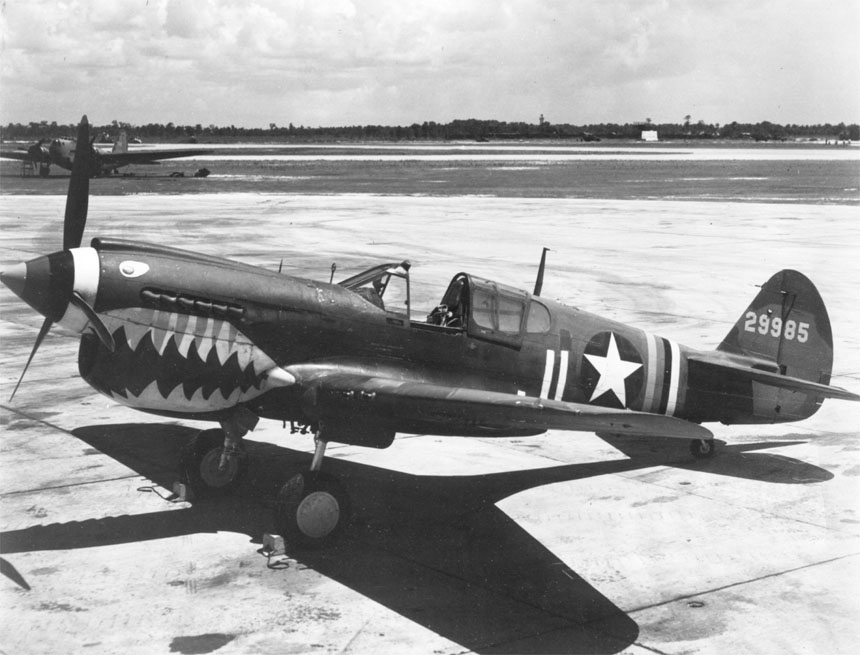
A Curtiss P-40M, tested by the squadron in 1944

The beginning of 1944 was quiet for the squadron, and the first air combats did not occur until mid-February. On 14 February 1944, the unit was redesignated No. 32 Fighter Squadron. On 16 February, Warrant Officer Eino Koskinen scored the squadron’s only aerial victory with LaGG aircraft by shooting down a LaGG-3 of 415 IAP. Spring thaw at Nurmoila again stopped flying for more than a month, and reconnaissance and interception flights resumed only on 8 April. During the spring, Soviet forces also transferred Lavochkin La-5 fighters to the Olonets Isthmus. Because the La-5 outperformed the Curtiss fighters, a six-Messerschmitt Bf 109 flight, 1/HLeLv 24 under Mannerheim Cross recipient Lieutenant Lauri Nissinen, was transferred from No. 24 Squadron to Nurmoila on 12 May to counter the increasing La-5 threat. The detachment returned to its parent squadron on 3 June after shooting down five La-5s. Major Bremer was transferred on 17 June 1944. Captain Aaro Virkkunen served as acting commander until 23 June, when Captain Kullervo Lahtela was appointed commander. The Soviet offensive on the Olonets Isthmus began on 21 June, soon forcing the squadron to withdraw. On 23 June, it moved to Uomaa, from where it carried out ground-attack missions against Soviet landing forces at Tuulos. On the same day, reconnaissance became its principal task. The squadron withdrew again on 4 July to Mensuvaara, where it flew reconnaissance missions and bomber-escort sorties. At Mensuvaara, it also received a captured and restored Curtiss P-40M, which was not used on combat sorties but was flown on familiarization flights by several pilots. As the front stabilized in mid-July, enemy aircraft were encountered only occasionally. The squadron’s final aerial victory was achieved on 27 July 1944, when Lieutenant Jorma Pesola of the 2nd Flight shot down a U-2 reconnaissance aircraft at Syvälampi.

=== Disbandment ===
After the armistice on 4 September 1944, the squadron moved first to Rantasalmi beginning on 6 September and then to Mikkeli by 21 September. Under the terms of the armistice, its reservists were demobilized by 20 November 1944. The Finnish Air Force was then reduced to peacetime strength, and No. 32 Squadron was disbanded on 4 December 1944. Its remaining aircraft were transferred to the squadrons that continued in service: the Curtiss fighters to No. 11 Fighter Squadron and No. 13 Fighter Squadron, and the LaGG aircraft to No. 11 Fighter Squadron.

== Organization ==
=== Continuation War ===
- 1st Flight (1. Lentue)
  - Detachment H (Osasto H)
- 2nd Flight (2. Lentue)
- 3rd Flight (3. Lentue)
- Detachment Kalaja (Osasto Kalaja)
- 1st Flight of No. 24 Squadron (1./HLeLv 24)

== Aircraft ==
The squadron operated the following aircraft:

- Brewster B-239
- Fokker D.XXI
- Hawker Hurricane
- Curtiss Hawk 75
- Lavochkin LaGG-3
- Curtiss P-40M (trial use)

== Combat record ==
The squadron was one of the most successful Finnish fighter units of the Continuation War. It achieved 202⅓ aerial victories in total, of which 190⅓ were claimed with Curtiss Hawk fighters and 12 with other aircraft types. It lost 24 aircraft and 16 pilots.
