= Fokker D.XXI =

1936 Dutch fighter aircraft

D.XXI
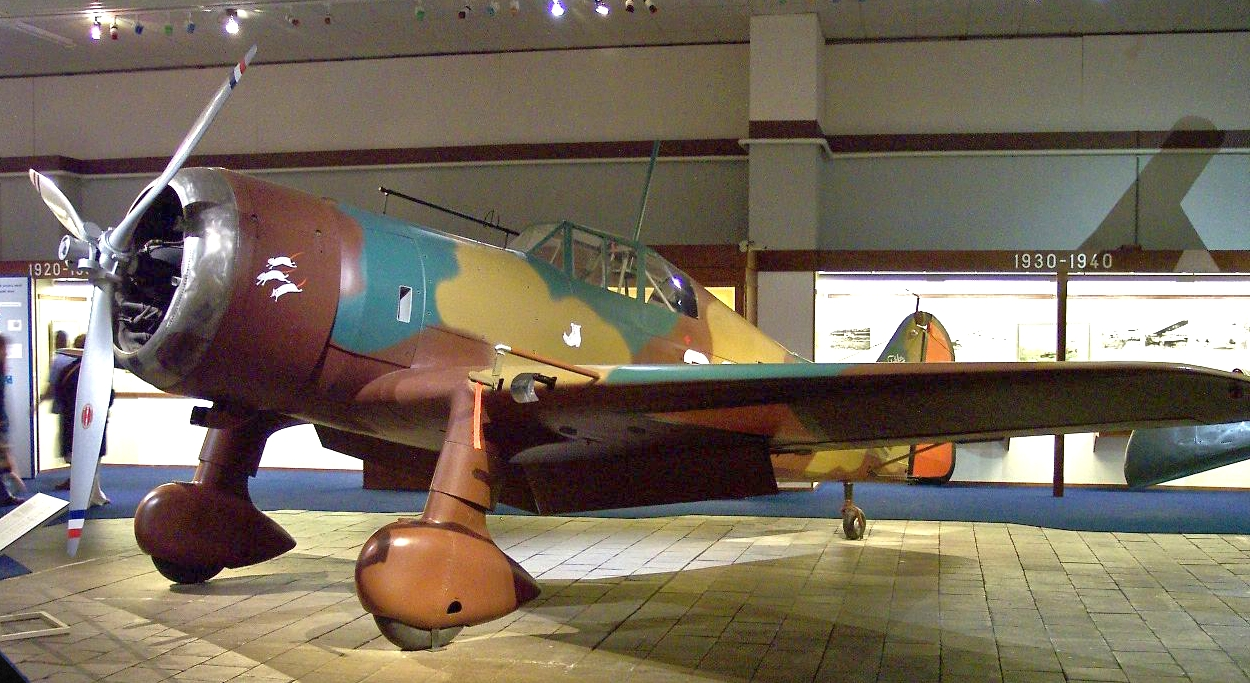

General information
- Type: Fighter
- National origin: Netherlands
- Manufacturer: Fokker
- Designer: Erich Schatzki
- Status: Retired
- Primary users: Finnish Air Force: Dutch Air Force; Royal Danish Air Force
- Number built: 148

History
- First flight: 27 March 1936
- Retired: 1948

The Fokker D.XXI fighter was designed in 1935 by Dutch aircraft manufacturer Fokker in response to requirements laid out by the Royal Netherlands East Indies Army Air Force (Militaire Luchtvaart van het Koninklijk Nederlands-Indisch Leger, ML-KNIL).

The D.XXI was designed as an inexpensive, rugged, and compact fighter aircraft that would possess respectable performance for its era. Entering operational use in the early years of the Second World War, it provided yeoman service for both the Luchtvaartafdeling (Dutch Army Aviation Group) and the Finnish Air Force. Additionally, a few examples were constructed by the El Carmolí factory before it fell into rebel hands during the Spanish Civil War. Following the invasion and occupation of the Netherlands in May 1940, several captured Dutch D.XXIs were subsequently placed into service with the Luftwaffe.

== Development ==
=== Origins ===
On 14 November 1934, design proposals for a new fighter aircraft were submitted by Fokker to the Luchtvaartafdeling (Dutch Army Aviation Group). Fokker's design team, led by Erich Schatzki, and based at the firm's newly completed plant in the southern district of Amsterdam, had sought to incorporate and combine various new concepts and recent features from successful fighter aircraft, including the previous C.X and D.XVII aircraft. The proposed aircraft was a low-wing monoplane which adopted an entirely enclosed cockpit; initial design work had been conducted in cooperation with British engine manufacturer Rolls-Royce, and it had been originally envisaged that the type would be powered by a Rolls-Royce Kestrel IV. Projections of the aircraft's performance included a maximum speed of 420 km/h at an altitude of 4,350 meters, a range of 888 km, and an altitude ceiling of 10,000 meters. The planned armament included rifle-calibre machine guns or 20mm cannons, which were to be embedded into the wings and fuselage.

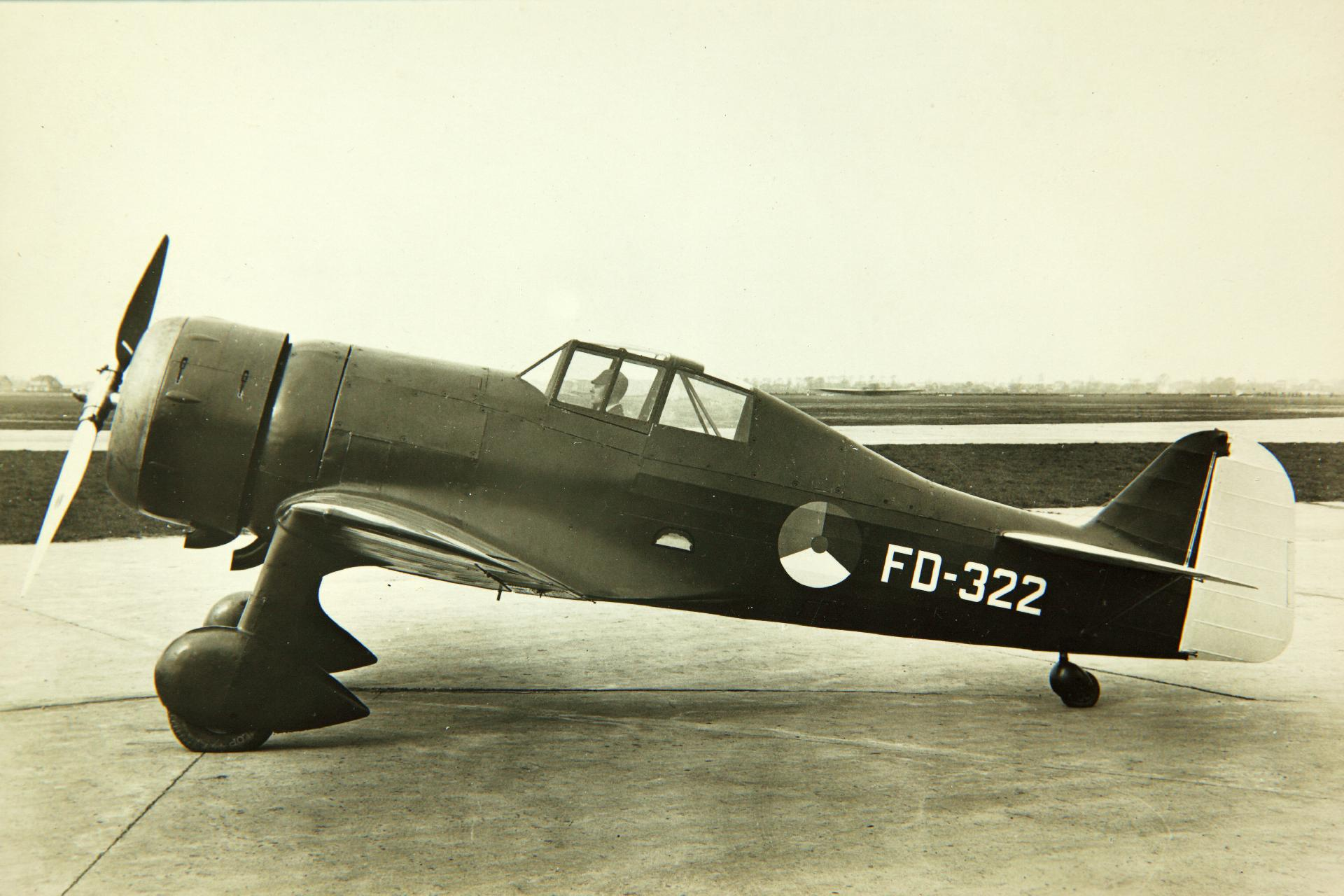
Fokker D.XXI Prototype

In early 1935, the Luchtvaartafdeling signed a contract for a single prototype of the proposed fighter to be constructed for an evaluation to be performed by the Royal Netherlands East Indies Army. This prototype, designated FD-322, which was powered by a single Bristol Mercury VI-S radial engine which drove a three-blade, two-pitch propeller, performed its maiden flight at Welschap Airfield, Eindhoven, on 27 March 1936. According to aviation author G.H. Kamphuis, the prospects for series production of the new fighter looked doubtful shortly after the first flight was performed due to a high level change in Dutch defence policy; Minister for Foreign Affairs Hendrik Colijn informed the Ministry of War that, in response to the changing international situation, a higher priority would be placed on building up a substantial bomber capability over new fighter aircraft. The change in policy emphasising bombers over fighters was somewhat controversial, in part due to order for new fighters and reconnaissance aircraft being both under consideration at this time, while a requirement for a new training aircraft had also been identified.

In addition to the Luchtvaartafdeling's interest in a trainer aircraft, the service had also attached great importance to the concept of a heavily armed 'cruiser' aircraft capable of performing multiple mission types. Further doubts and confusion were added by the emergence of a competing aircraft proposal in the form of the Koolhoven F.K.58, which had also been designed by Ir. Schatzki. The F.K.58 was somewhat more advanced than the D.XXI, possessing a retractable undercarriage and a higher top speed of 520 km/h. It was decided that the D.XXI and F.K.58 should participate in a series of comparative tests against one another, leading to the D.XXI prototype being dispatched to Soesterberg Air Base, Utrecht, in November 1936. However, head-to-head testing between the two types was delayed by the F.K.58, which did not perform its first flight until September 1938.

=== Into production ===
During 1937, the Dutch government gave funding and its approval for a limited expansion of the Army Aviation Group, which resulted in an order being placed for 36 Fokker D.XXI fighters, to be powered by the 830 h.p. Bristol Mercury VII or VIII engines. According to Kamphuis, Dutch interest in the D.XXI had been revived, in part, due to an examination of the first aircraft by an evaluation board, which itself had been conducted due to interest expressed by the Finnish Air Force, which itself would result in export sales being made to Finland. On 20 July 1938, the first Luchtvaartafdeling D.XXI conducted its first flight, after which it participated in test flights prior to deliver to Soesterberg. On 8 September 1939, the final aircraft of the first batch of 36 was delivered.

Even as the domestic demand for the D.XXI was being questioned, the type had attracted the attention of a number of foreign governments. In 1937, the Finnish government decided to place an order for an initial batch of seven aircraft, further negotiations were also conducted towards the acquisition of a manufacturing license, under which Finland proceeded to domestically produce further aircraft as well. Between 1939 and 1944, the State Aircraft Factory (Valtion Lentokonetehdas) at Tampere manufactured a total of 93 aircraft.

Throughout 1940 and 1941, the Finnish State Aircraft Factory set about reconditioning the aircraft that had been used in the Winter War for continued service; an additional 50 D.XXIs were ordered in 1941, which were powered by the Pratt & Whitney R-1535 Twin Wasp Junior engine, acquired via Sweden. These can be identified by their longer cockpit glazing, smooth cowl, and large ventral air intake under the cowl. The two fuselage-mounted machine guns on these D.XXIs were relocated in the wings and the vertical tail surface was increased in size to offset the new engine. Owing to the increased loaded weight, the R-1535-powered D.XXI had a slightly reduced performance and was not as maneuverable as the Mercury-powered versions. In 1944, five additional Finnish D.XXIs were assembled from spares.

The Danish government ordered a pair of D.XXI fighters along with arrangements for its own manufacturing license. The Danish D.XXI fighters were powered by a 645 h.p. Bristol Mercury VI-S radial and carried a Madsen 20 mm cannon under each wing. Ten aircraft were completed by the Royal Army Aircraft Factory in Copenhagen prior to the German invasion of Denmark in April 1940. The Second Spanish Republic also acquired a manufacturing license for the D.XXI. Reportedly, a total of 50 fuselages were manufactured on the Spanish production line; however, the Spanish plant in which the fighter was being produced was overrun by Nationalist forces before any of the Spanish-built aircraft were completed. Some sources say that a single Spanish D.XXI managed to escape capture after the production facility was captured.

== Design ==
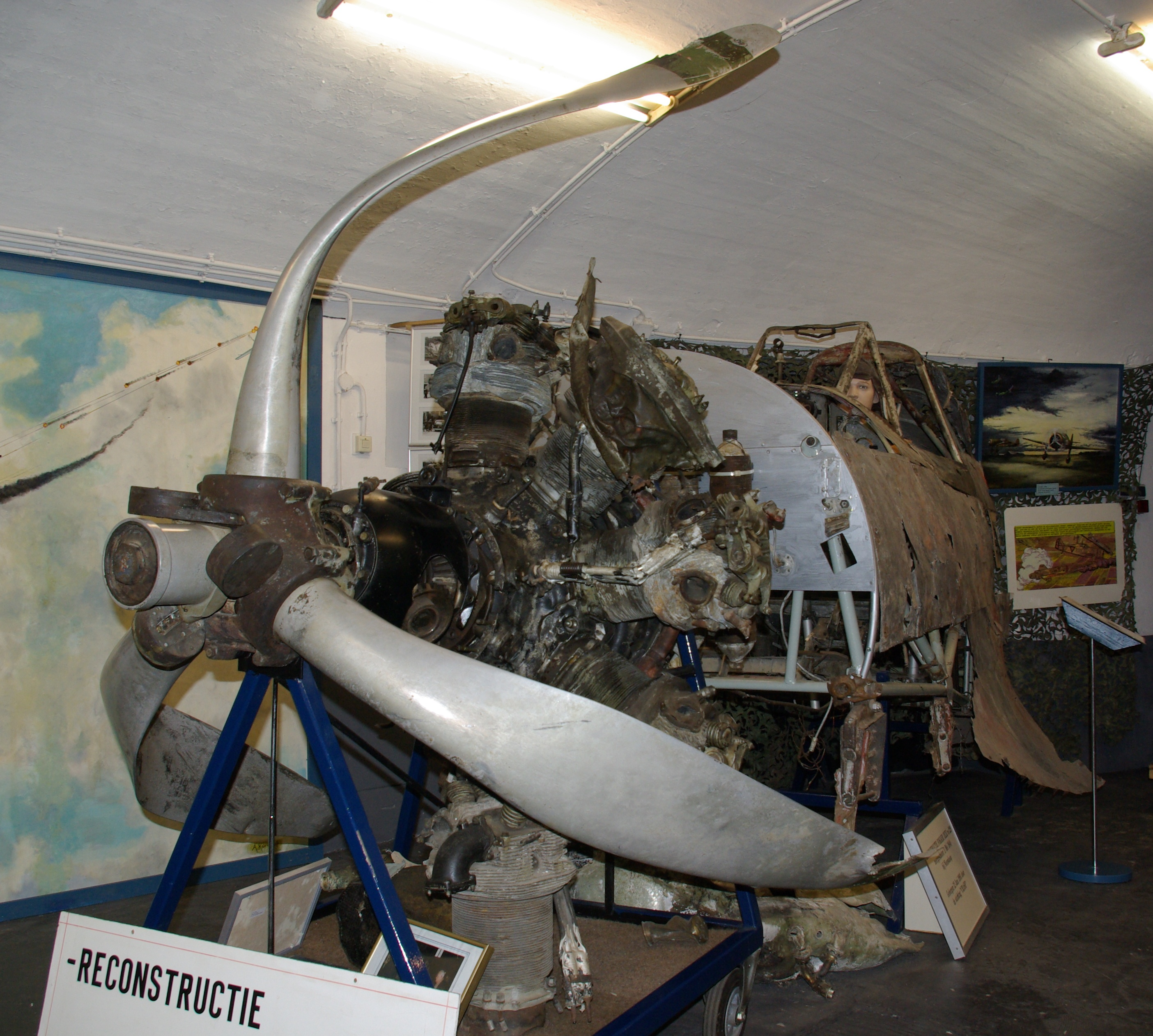
Preserved forward fuselage of a crashed Fokker D.XXI

The Fokker D.XXI was a low-wing monoplane fighter aircraft. Following standard Fokker design practice of the period, it featured a welded steel tube fuselage that was largely covered by fabric, including the flight control surfaces; element forward of the trailing edges of the wings were covered by detachable aluminum panels instead. The wings were of a wooden construction, being composed of two box spars attached to ribs made of plywood. The aircraft was outfitted with a fixed spatted undercarriage with cantilever legs; braking was provided by independently-operated pedals using compressed air.

The cockpit of the D.XXI was fully enclosed by a plexiglas hood featuring large sliding sections, and was entirely jettisonable in an emergency situation to enable pilots to bail out. Pilots were protected against turnover injuries by means of a pylon built into the structure of the aircraft set behind the seat. Fuel was housed in a 350-litre (77 imp gal) tank located aft of the engine, wing-mounted auxiliary fuel tanks could also be installed. The main armament consisted of two pairs of 7.92mm M36 FN-Browning machine guns, housed within the wings, carrying 300 rounds of ammunition each. Upon its entry to service in 1938, the D.XXI represented a significant leap forward for the Dutch Army Aviation Group, whose fighter force had until that time consisted of aging biplanes with open cockpits. The new Fokker quickly proved to be an extremely sturdy aircraft, being capable of attaining a speed of 700 km/h in a dive.

During the early production of the D.XXI, Fokker's design office considered a number of developments to the basic design, including a wing re-design. A number of alternative engines were considered, including such power plants as the 650 hp (480 kW) Rolls-Royce Kestrel V and the 750 hp (560 kW) Pratt and Whitney Twin Wasp Junior. During 1938, work on three extensively modified versions known as the 150, 151 and 152 were initiated. These aircraft were to be powered by the 1,375 hp (1,025 kW) Bristol Hercules, the 1,050 hp (780 kW) Rolls-Royce Merlin and the 1,090 hp (810 kW) Daimler-Benz DB 600H. Retractable landing gear was incorporated into these redesigns.

== Operational history ==
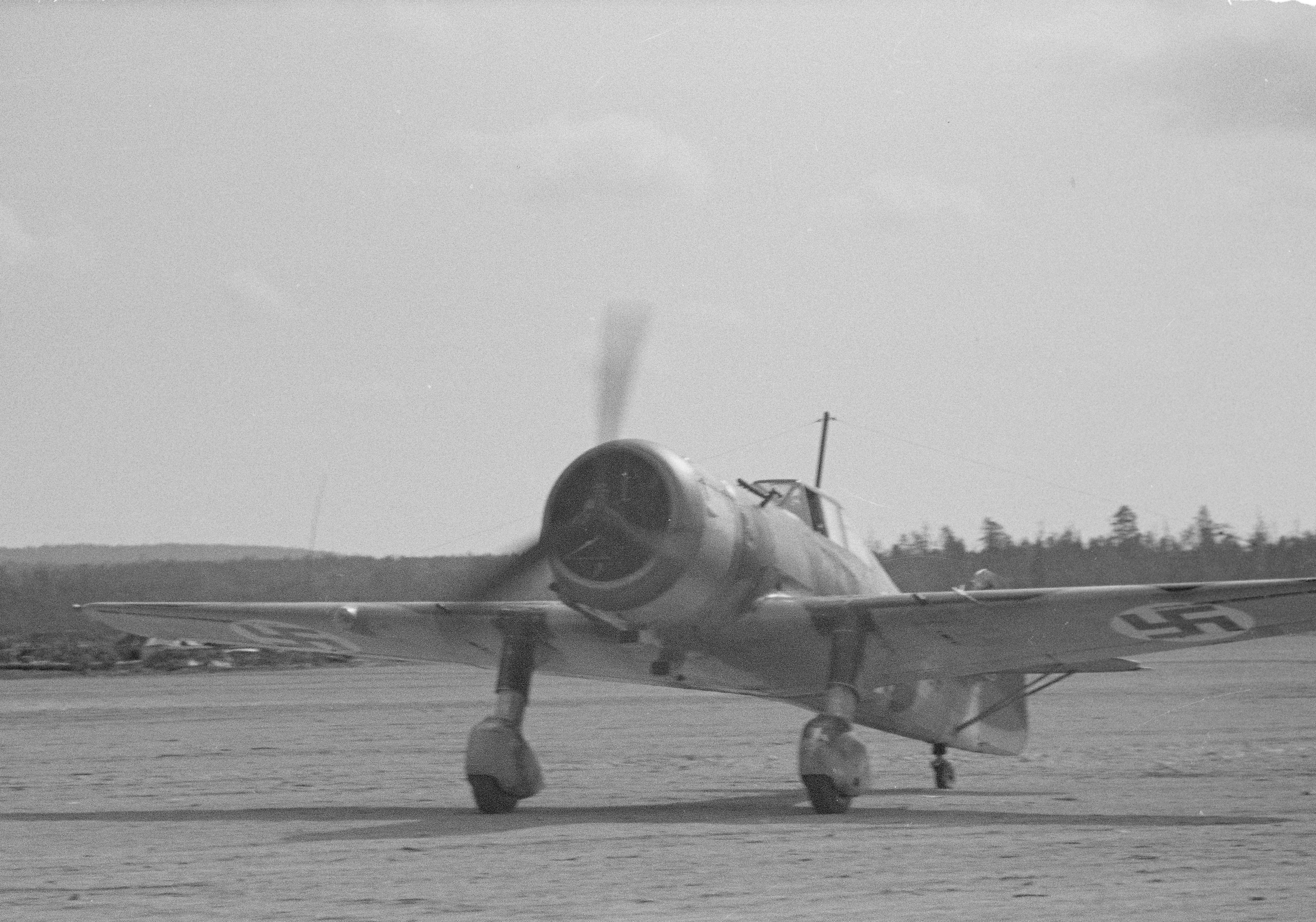
A Fokker D.XXI, August 1942

The Fokker D.XXI was first used in combat by the Finnish Air Force during the 1939–1940 Winter War between the Soviet Union and Finland. Upon the war's outbreak, a total of 41 aircraft were in Finnish service, all powered by the Mercury VIII engine. On 1 December 1939, the D.XXI achieved its first victory with the shooting down of a Soviet Tupolev SB. The Fokker was evenly matched against the aircraft of the Soviet Air Force, and its rugged design with a radial engine and fixed undercarriage made it well suited for Finnish conditions. The performance of the Finnish D.XXI allegedly won the admiration of many Soviet pilots.

As the Winter War continued and newer models of Soviet fighters appeared, the Fokker D.XXI proved to be increasingly underpowered and too lightly armed (with only four 7.92 mm/.312 in machine guns) to compete; plans to arm the Fokkers with 20 mm cannons were dropped, and only one fighter was armed with two 20 mm cannons and two 7.92 mm/.312 in machine guns. Another fighter was equipped with retractable landing gear, but due to less than anticipated performance improvement was not continued in the series. The fixed undercarriage lent itself to both unimproved runways and conversion to skis for winter use, both of which were advantages in the Finnish theater. A total of 12 D.XXI aircraft were lost during the conflict, six being lost to accidents rather than enemy action.

The conflict between Finland and the Soviet Union was resumed in the Continuation War (1941–1944), the D.XXI was again a key element of the Finnish Air Force. During the first air battle, six Mercury-engined D.XXIs shot down a pair of Soviet Ilyushin DB-3 bombers. Several Finnish Air Force pilots became fighter aces with the Fokker D.XXI. The top scoring Fokker ace, Jorma Sarvanto, obtained 12 5/6 victories with the type; many other future aces also scored at least one victory with the Fokker. The highest scoring airframe was FR-110, achieving 10 victories; this aircraft survived the war and is on display at the Central Finland Aviation Museum. Finland continued to operate their D.XXIs until 1949, and classified them as surplus to requirements in 1952.

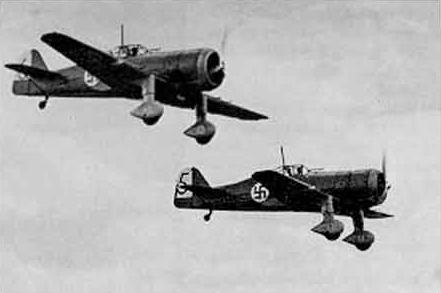
Pair of Finnish Air Force Fokker D.XXI in flight

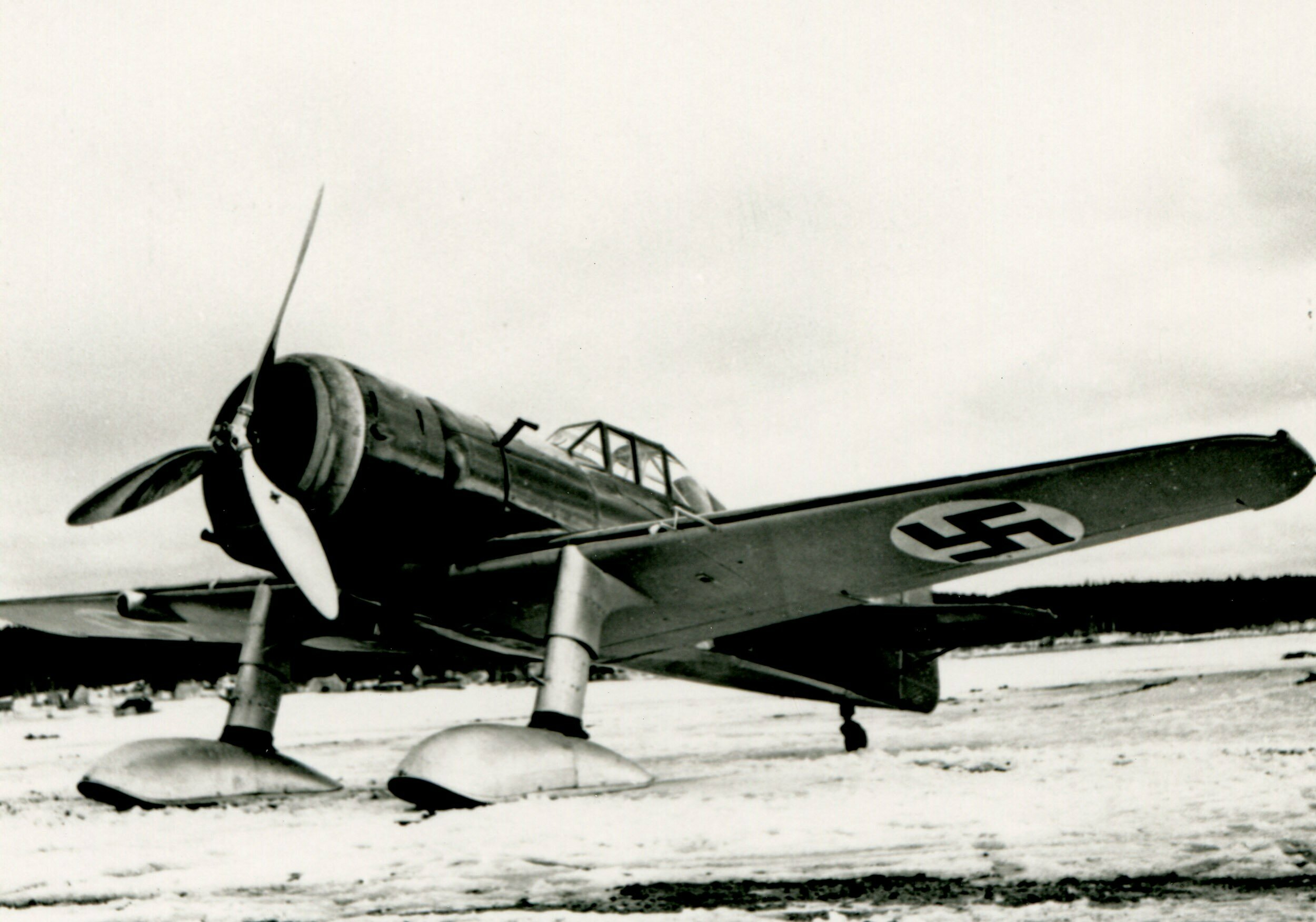
Finnish D.XXI equipped with skis.

Although the order by the ML-KNIL was cancelled, the Luchtvaartafdeling (Dutch Army Air Force before World War II) placed an order of 36 aircraft, which were all delivered in time to participate in the war against the Germans in May 1940. On 10 May 1940, the day that Germany launched its invasion of the Netherlands, 28 D.XXIs were serviceable and ready for operations. That first day, six D.XXIs escorted a formation of Fokker T.V bombers to attack the Meuse bridges to hinder the German advance; they were intercepted by nine German Messerschmitt Bf 109s, and during the ensuing dogfight, one Bf 109 was shot down and two more damaged for the loss of one D.XXI and two T.Vs. That same day, a flight of D.XXIs intercepted and shot down 37 out of 55 inbound Junkers Ju 52 transports which had crossed the border during the early morning.

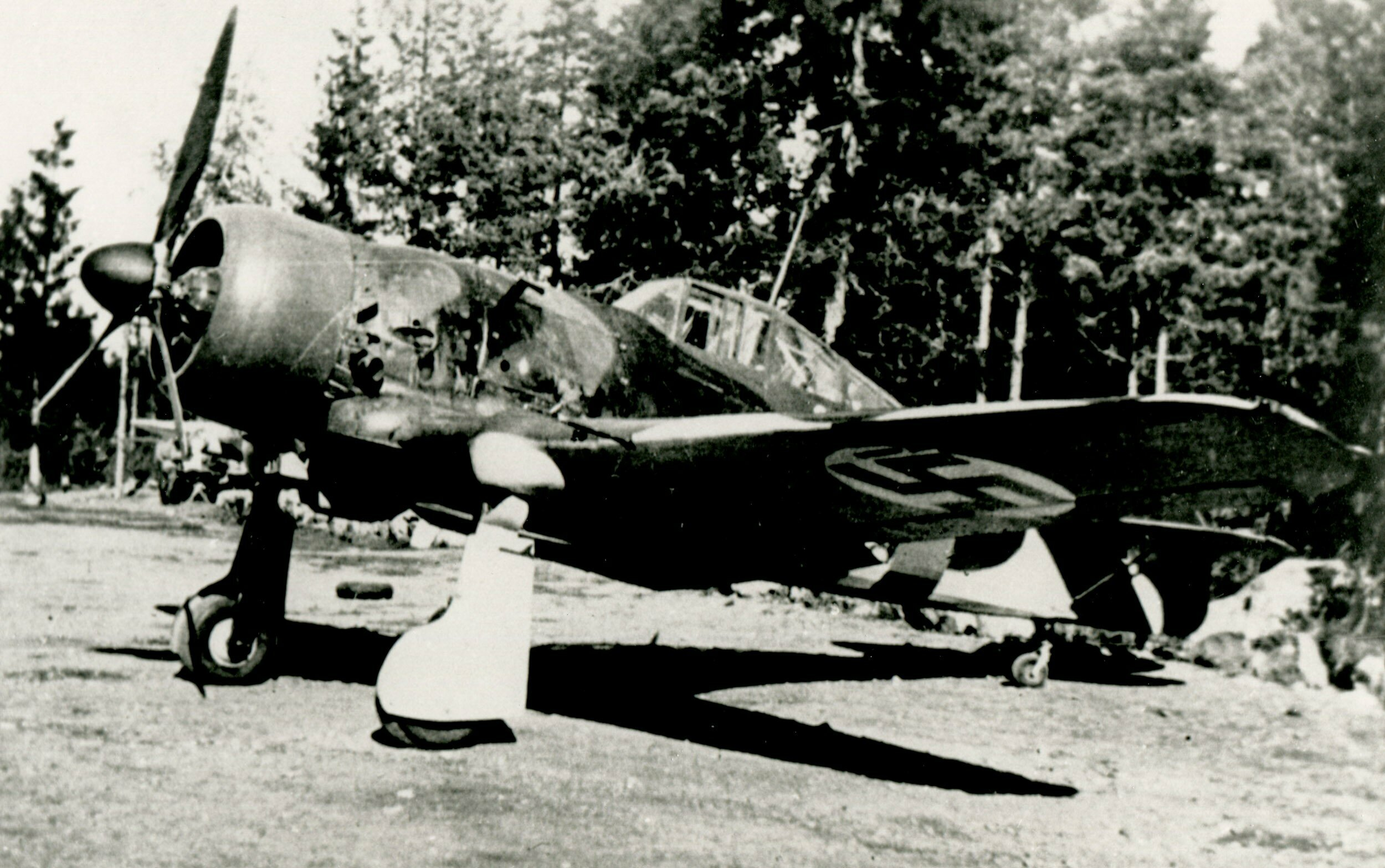
Damaged D.XXI in 1943.

Due to many aircraft becoming unserviceable as a result of battle damage after the first day, it was decided to regroup at Buiksloot, north of Amsterdam, on 11 May. For the following four days, missions out of Buiksloot were flown by D.XXIs flying in both solo and small formations to escort friendly units as well as in the search-and-destroy role. On 11 May, at least two Bf 109s were recorded as having been shot down by D.XXI fighters. Sorties against the numerically superior German forces continued until the middle of 14 May, at which point news of the Dutch capitulation reached Buiksloot, upon which both the remaining aircraft and the airstrip were destroyed to prevent their use by the Germans. Out of the original force of 28 D.XXI aircraft, eight fighters had remained airworthy. The D.XXI, although much slower and more lightly armed than the Bf 109, performed surprisingly well in combat due to its manoeuvrability. It was also one of the few aircraft that could follow a Stuka bomber into its dive. Nonetheless, the numerical superiority of the Luftwaffe led to the destruction of most Luchtvaartafdeling D.XXI fighters during the campaign. Some were captured during and after 15 May, but their later fates are unknown.

The LVA (Netherlands Air Force) scored a total of 38 victories against the Luftwaffe during their struggle against the German juggernaut. Sixteen of those went to Fokker D.XXI pilots.

== Variants ==
D.XXI
Prototype serial no FD-322
D.XXI-1
Pattern aircraft supplied to Denmark, three built, powered by 645 hp (481 kW) Bristol Mercury VIS engines. Armed with 2x 8 mm (0.315 in) machine guns and 2x 20 mm (0.787 in) Madsen cannon
D.XXI-1
Production aircraft built at the Royal Army Aircraft Factory, ten built powered by 830 hp (619 kW) Bristol Mercury VIII engines.
D.XXI-2
53 Built, of which 36 were delivered to the RNLAF.
D.XXI-3
Finnish license-built D.XXI-2s, fitted with additional 20 mm (0.787 in) cannons in 1940. Number built: 35
D.XXI-4
Upgraded D.XXI-3, powered by 825 hp (615 kW) Pratt & Whitney R-1535-SB4C-G Twin Wasp Junior engines. Number built: 55
Project 150
Proposed version powered by a Bristol Hercules radial piston engine. Not built.
Project 151
Proposed version powered by a Rolls-Royce Merlin piston engine. Not built.
Project 152
Proposed version powered by a Daimler-Benz DB 600H engine. Not built.

== Operators ==
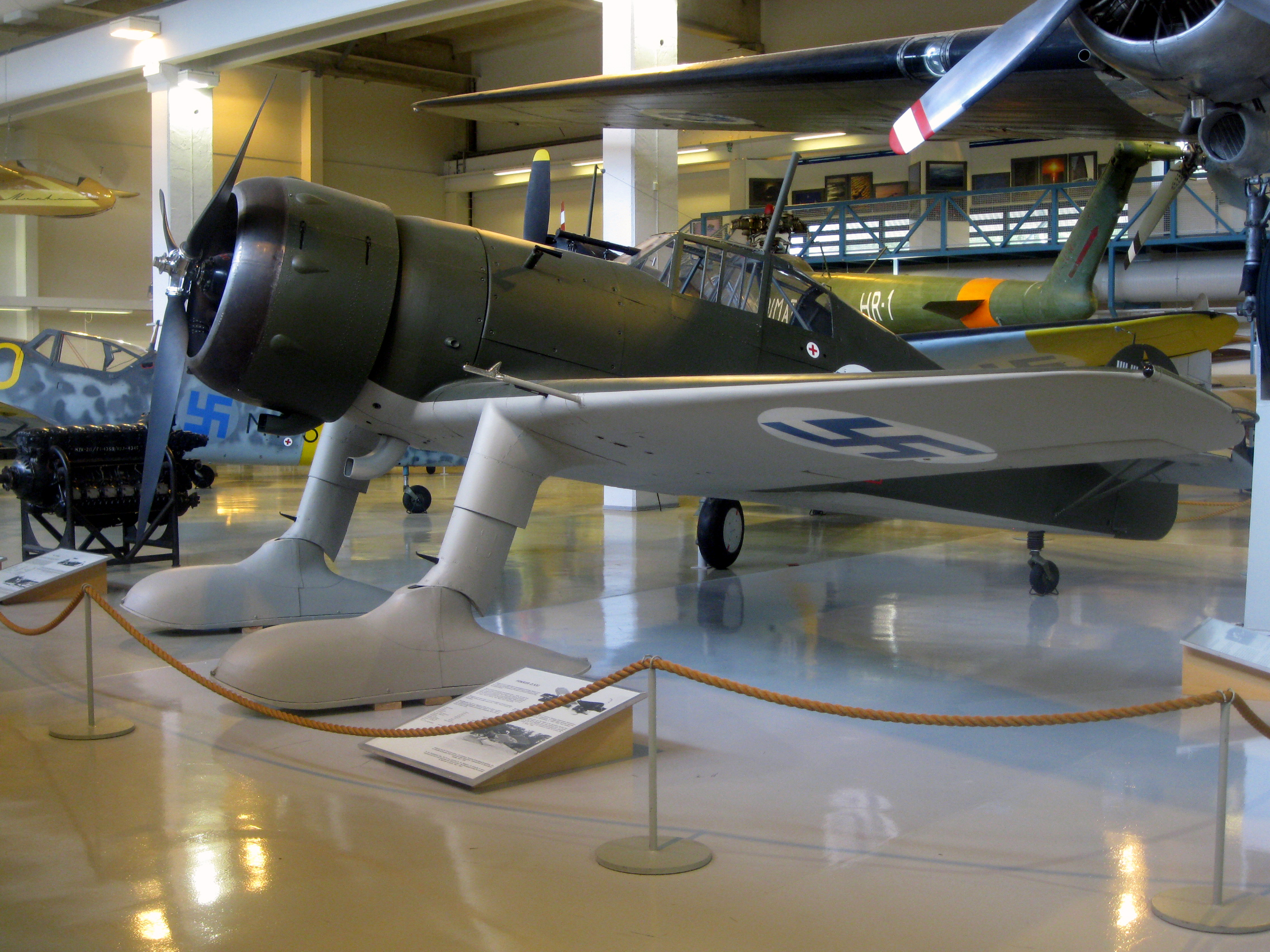
Fokker D.XXI (FR-110) in Aviation Museum of Central Finland

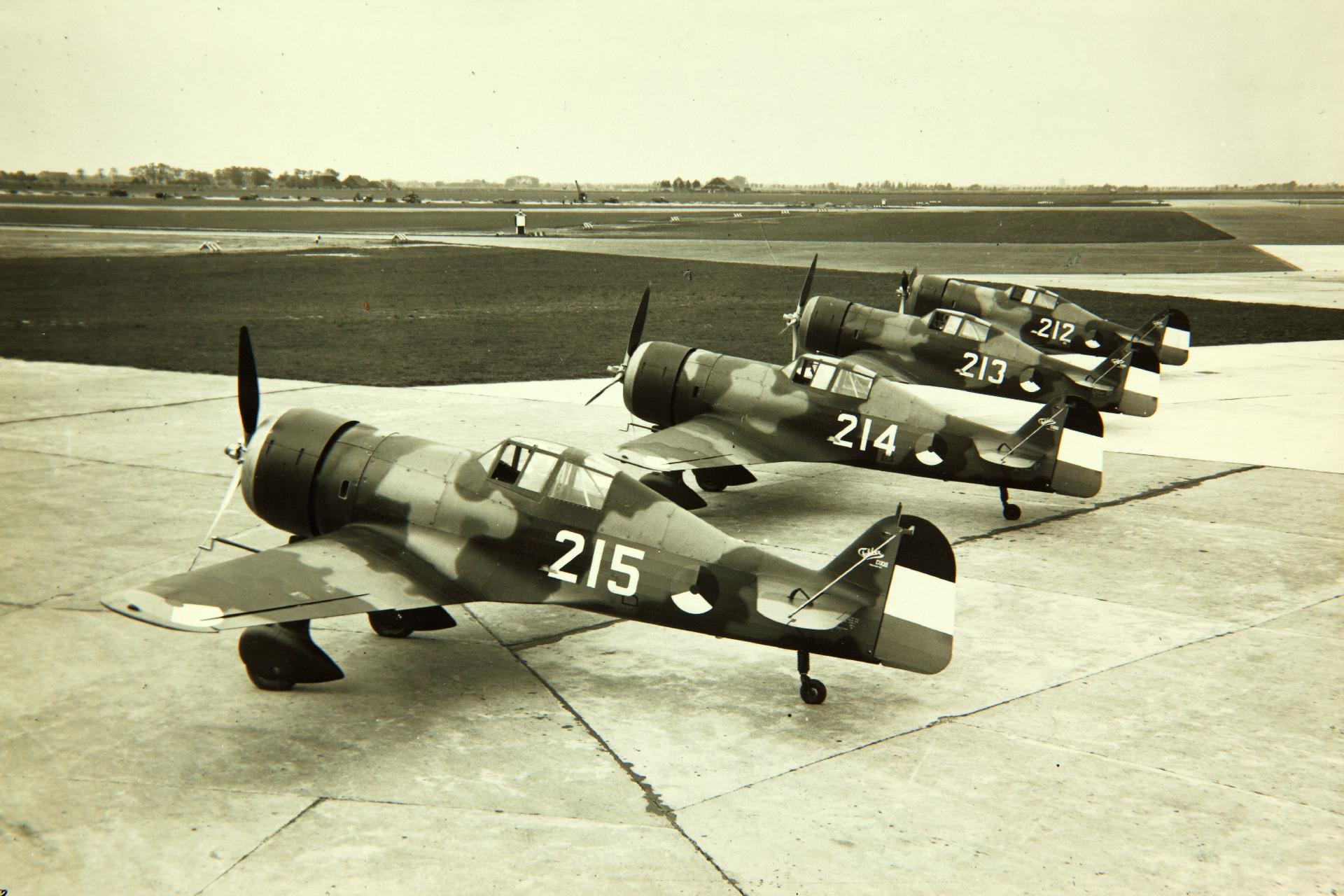
Four Fokker D.XXIs of the Netherlands Air Force

Denmark

- Hærens Flyvertropper (Danish Army Aviation Troops) – Received three aircraft and built ten on license. Locally designated as "IIIJ" ("third fighter aircraft").
  - Jydske Flyverafdeling – two. Eskadrille

Finland

- Finnish Air Force – Received seven aircraft and built 90 on license.
  - No. 10 Squadron, Finnish Air Force
  - No. 12 Squadron, Finnish Air Force
  - No. 14 Squadron, Finnish Air Force
  - No. 24 Squadron, Finnish Air Force
  - No. 26 Squadron, Finnish Air Force
  - No. 30 Squadron, Finnish Air Force
  - No. 32 Squadron, Finnish Air Force

Nazi Germany

- Luftwaffe – Operated an unknown number of captured Dutch aircraft.

Netherlands

- Dutch Army Aviation Group – Received 36 aircraft.

(Spain) Spanish Republic

- Spanish Republican Air Force – May have completed one aircraft.

== Aircraft on display ==
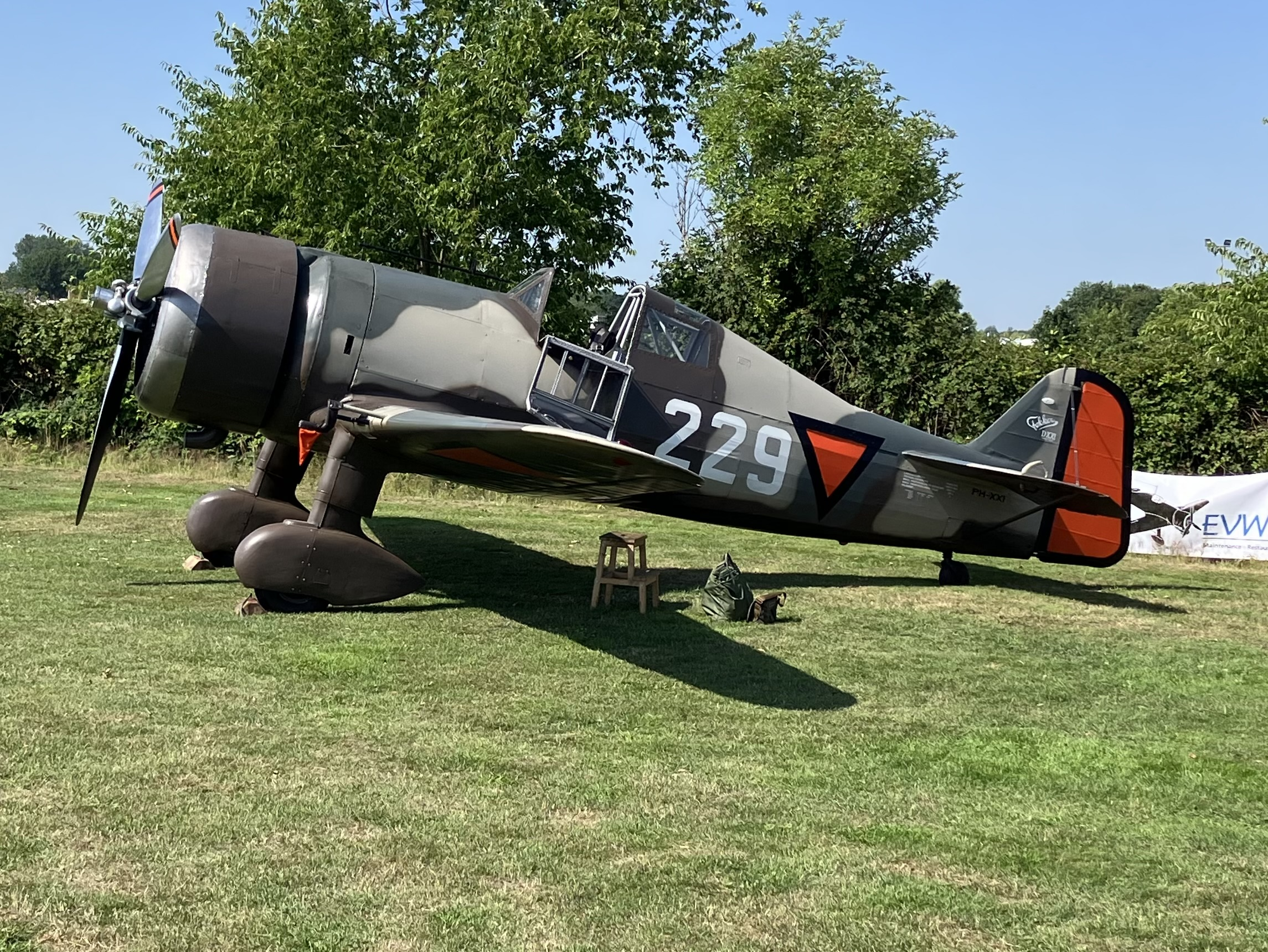
The flyable replica of the Fokker D.XXI at vliegveld Hoogeveen

A Mercury-engine Finnish-built Fokker D.XXI, FR-110, is on display at the Finnish Air Force Museum, Jyväskylä, Finland. This is the highest scoring (10 victories) D.XXI airframe. It was the mount of Lt. Viktor Pyötsiä during the Winter War.

In 2022, a flyable replica was completed at Hoogeveen Airport by veteran aircraft restorer Jack van Egmond. A number of original parts was used and the plane was built according to original Fokker build specifications as Jack van Egmond is in possession of 397 out of 416 Fokker blueprints. It made its first flight on 23 May 2022.

The Crash 40-45 museum in Aalsmeer, The Netherlands, displays the remains of the original no.229, consisting of the engine, fuselage tubing remains and partial cockpit.

A full-scale static replica was built by Fokker in 1988 and is on display at the Nationaal Militair Museum in Soesterberg, The Netherlands. This replica has an incorrect set of undercarriage pants, as these differed between Dutch and Finnish D.XXI models and the wrong drawings were used.

== Specifications (D.XXI – Finland – Mercury) ==

Data from

General characteristics

- Crew: one
- Length: 8.2 m (26 ft 11 in)
- Wingspan: 11 m (36 ft 1 in)
- Height: 2.92 m (9 ft 7 in)
- Wing area: 16.2 m^{2} (174 sq ft)
- Empty weight: 1,594 kg (3,514 lb)
- Gross weight: 1,970 kg (4,343 lb)
- Powerplant: 1 × Bristol Mercury VIII 9-cyl. air-cooled radial piston engine, 620 kW (830 hp)

Performance

- Maximum speed: 460 km/h (290 mph, 250 kn)
- Cruise speed: 429 km/h (267 mph, 232 kn)
- Never exceed speed: 700 km/h (430 mph, 380 kn)
- Range: 930 km (580 mi, 500 nmi)
- Service ceiling: 11,350 m (37,240 ft) service ceiling
- Time to altitude: 6,000 m (19,685 ft 0 in) in 7 min 30 sec
- Power/mass: 0.309 kW/kg (0.188 hp/lb)

Armament

- 4 × 7.7 mm (0.303 in) Vickers machine guns

== See also ==
Aircraft of comparable role, configuration, and era

- Curtiss Hawk 75
- Fiat G.50
- Koolhoven F.K.58
- Nakajima Ki-27
- Weiss Manfréd WM-23 Ezüst Nyíl
- Polikarpov I-16

Related lists

- List of fighter aircraft
- List of aircraft of the Spanish Republican Air Force
- List of aircraft of World War II
