= No. 16 Squadron (Finland) =

- Lentolaivue 16
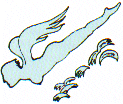
- Fokker C.X, a primary aircraft of the squadron
- Active: 30 November 1939 – 13 March 1940; 25 June 1941 – 4 September 1944
- Country: Finland
- Branch: Finnish Air Force
- Type: Reconnaissance squadron
- Role: Tactical reconnaissance, army cooperation
- Part of: Flying Regiment 1 (Winter War); Flying Regiment 2 (Continuation War)
- Engagements: Winter War; Continuation War

No. 16 Squadron (Finnish: Lentolaivue 16 or LLv.16, from 3 May 1942 Le.Lv.16, and from 14 February 1944 No. 16 Reconnaissance Squadron (Tiedustelulentolaivue 16, TLeLv 16)) was a reconnaissance squadron of the Finnish Air Force during World War II. The unit specialized in army cooperation and tactical reconnaissance, operating continuously near the front line in support of Finnish ground forces.

== History ==
=== Winter War ===
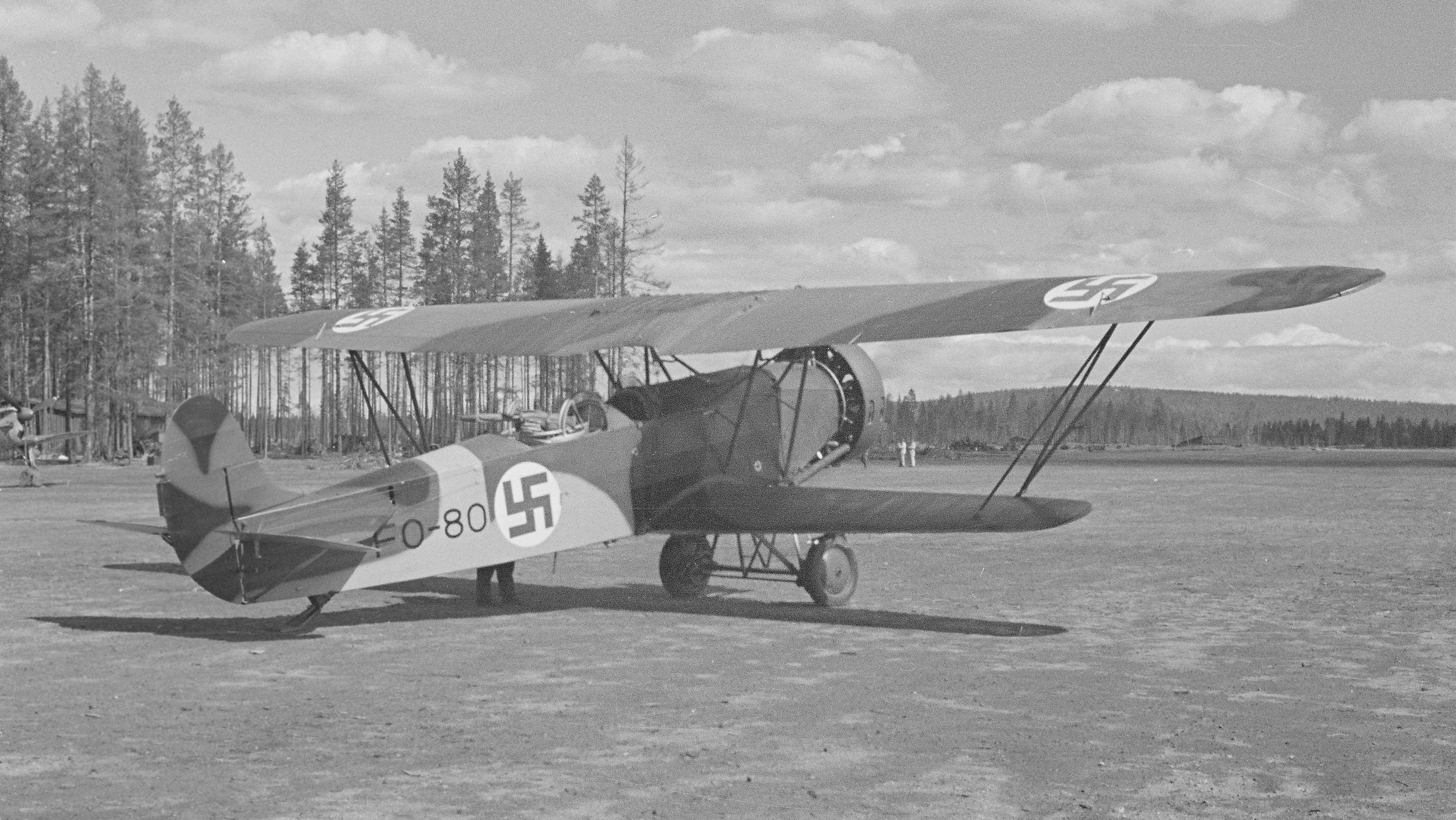
Fokker C.V used during the Winter War

The squadron was mobilized on 30 November 1939 at the outbreak of the Winter War and assigned to Flying Regiment 1. Its primary mission was reconnaissance and artillery observation in direct support of Finnish Army formations.

The squadron operated mainly:

- Fokker C.V
- Fokker C.X
- Junkers W 34

These aircraft were already outdated, but were suitable for short-range reconnaissance and liaison duties. The unit was subordinated to army corps and operated from forward airfields close to the front, often under difficult conditions. Missions included:

- artillery spotting
- reconnaissance of enemy troop movements
- communication between units

After the end of the Winter War, the squadron was disbanded on 13 March 1940.

=== Continuation War ===
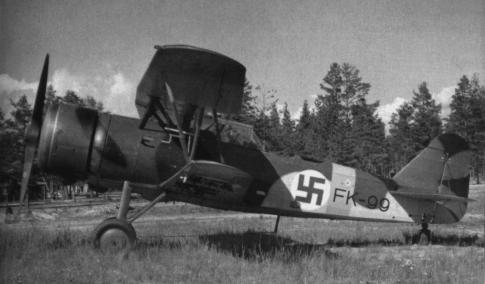
Fokker C.X in reconnaissance role

The squadron was re-established on 25 June 1941 at the beginning of the Continuation War and assigned to Flying Regiment 2.

==== 1941: Offensive phase ====
At the start of the war, the squadron supported advancing Finnish forces by conducting reconnaissance over the Karelian Isthmus and Ladoga Karelia.

Its operations followed the advancing army closely, relocating frequently between forward airfields. The squadron provided critical intelligence on:

- enemy defensive positions
- troop movements
- terrain conditions

==== 1942–1943: Stabilized front ====
After the front stabilized, the squadron operated mainly from established bases while continuing reconnaissance and observation missions.

Daily operations included:

- routine reconnaissance flights
- artillery fire correction
- photographic intelligence

Despite operating older aircraft, the squadron maintained continuous operational capability.

==== 1944: Soviet offensive and withdrawal ====
During the Soviet offensive in summer 1944, the squadron played an important role in monitoring enemy advances and supporting Finnish defensive operations. The rapid changes in the front line required frequent relocation of the unit. Missions became increasingly hazardous due to intensified Soviet air activity. In July–August 1944, Detachment Jäntti (Osasto Jäntti) was formed to carry out specific reconnaissance tasks during the critical phase of the fighting.

=== Disbandment ===
Following the armistice on 4 September 1944, the squadron was disbanded as part of the Finnish Air Force’s transition to peacetime organization.

== Organization ==
=== Continuation War ===
- Headquarters Flight (Esikuntalentue)
- 1st Flight (1. Lentue)
- 2nd Flight (2. Lentue)
- 3rd Flight (3. Lentue)
- Detachment Jäntti (Osasto Jäntti)

== Aircraft ==
=== Winter War ===
- Fokker C.V
- Fokker C.X
- Junkers W 34

=== Continuation War ===
- Fokker C.V
- Fokker C.X
- Junkers W 34

== Role and significance ==
No. 16 Squadron was one of the key reconnaissance units of the Finnish Air Force. Its importance lay in its ability to provide:

- real-time battlefield intelligence
- artillery targeting data
- situational awareness for ground forces

Although lacking modern aircraft, the squadron’s continuous operations ensured effective coordination between air and ground units throughout both wars.

== See also ==
- No. 12 Squadron (Finland)
- No. 14 Squadron (Finland)
