= No. 26 Squadron (Finland) =

- Lentolaivue 26
- Active: 10 October 1934 – 1 December 1952
- Country: Finland
- Branch: Finnish Air Force
- Type: Fighter squadron
- Role: Air defense, fighter operations
- Part of: Flying Regiment 2 Flying Regiment 3

No. 26 Squadron (Finnish: Lentolaivue 26 or LLv.26, later Le.Lv.26 and from 14 February 1944 Hävittäjälentolaivue 26 or HLe.Lv.26) was a fighter squadron of the Finnish Air Force during World War II. The squadron participated in the Winter War, Continuation War, and Lapland War. After the war, it was redesignated No. 23 Fighter Squadron and operated until its disbandment in 1952.

== History ==
=== Formation ===
During an organizational reform of the Finnish Air Force, the squadrons of the air stations were renumbered, and the fighter squadron of Air Station 5 at Suur-Merijoki became No. 26 Squadron. The unit was initially commanded by Major Einar Nuotio and equipped with de Havilland D.H.60 Moth and Aero A-32 aircraft. In early 1935, the squadron received Bristol Bulldog fighters.

On 1 January 1938, the air station system was abolished and replaced by flying regiments, and the squadron was subordinated to Flying Regiment 2. Prior to the Winter War, two flights were equipped with Fokker D.XXI fighters. Captain Erkki Heinilä assumed command on 9 October 1939.

=== Winter War ===
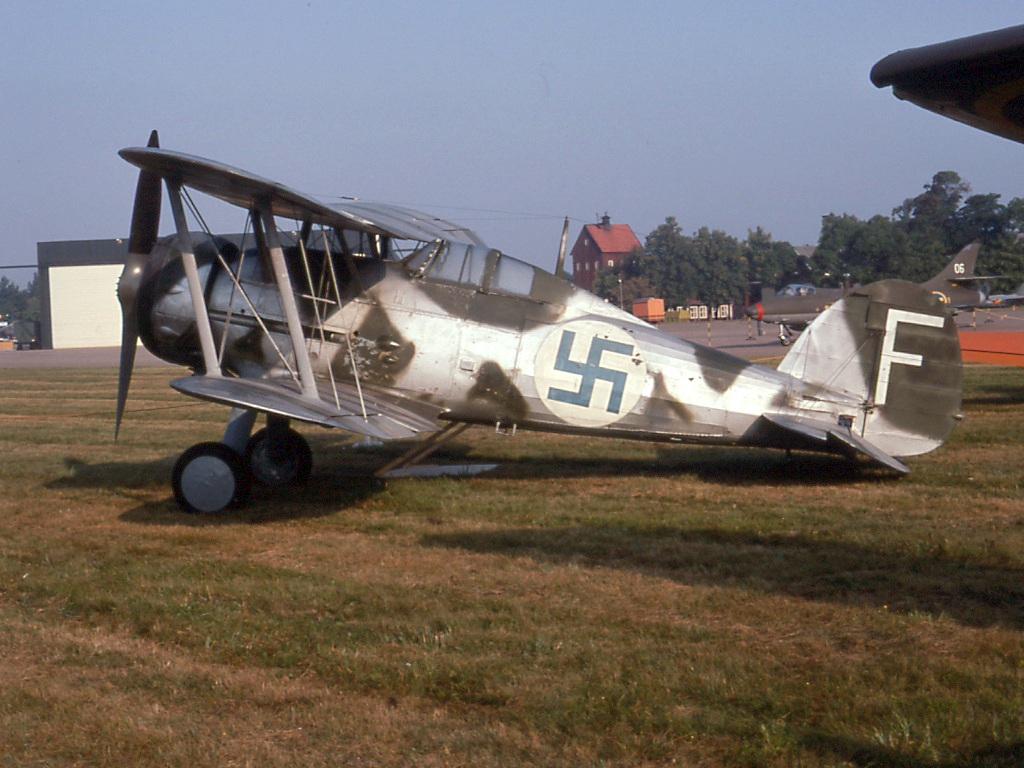
A Gloster Gladiator similar to those used by the squadron

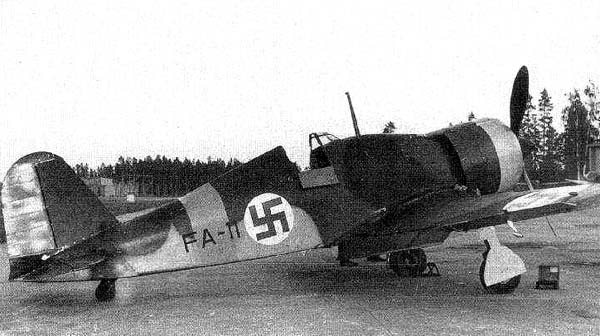
Fiat G.50 fighter

At the outbreak of the Winter War, the squadron was divided into detachments. The Bulldog-equipped Detachment Heinilä operated from Heinijoki, while two Fokker-equipped flights were subordinated to No. 24 Squadron.

On 30 November 1939, a Bulldog flown by Sergeant Uuttu shot down a Polikarpov I-16, achieving both the squadron's first aerial victory and the first aerial victory of the Finnish Air Force in the war.

Major Raoul Harju-Jeanty assumed command on 6 December 1939. During the war, the squadron replaced its obsolete Bulldog aircraft with Gloster Gladiator fighters in January 1940 and Fiat G.50 fighters in February 1940.

The squadron flew 1,170 sorties during the Winter War, achieving 34 aerial victories while losing 13 aircraft and 7 pilots.

=== Continuation War ===
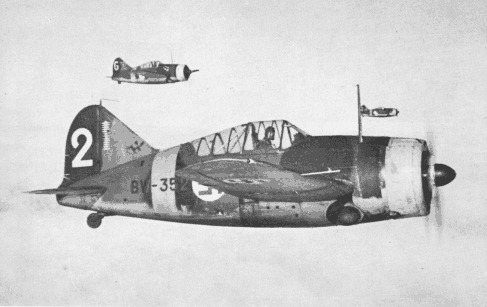
Brewster Buffalo used by the squadron

At the beginning of the Continuation War, the squadron, consisting of three Fiat-equipped flights, operated from Joroinen. Its mission was to support the advance of Finnish ground forces beginning in July 1941.

As the offensive progressed, the squadron operated from multiple forward airfields, including Rantasalmi, Joensuu, and Värtsilä. In August 1941, it moved to Lunkula, and on 16 September 1941 it relocated to Immola and was subordinated to Flying Regiment 3.

Captain Eino Carlsson assumed command on 1 December 1941 (promoted to Major in February 1942). During 1942, one flight at a time was stationed at Malmi to provide air defense for Helsinki. At this stage, fewer than ten Fiat G.50 aircraft were operational at any given time, significantly limiting activity.

In June 1942, the squadron moved to Kilpasilta. During late 1942 and throughout 1943, operations on the eastern Karelian Isthmus were limited, and combat contact was infrequent.

On 14 February 1944, the unit was redesignated No. 26 Fighter Squadron (Hävittäjälentolaivue 26). On 2 March 1944, Major Lauri Larjo replaced Carlsson as commander.

On 9 May 1944, the squadron moved to Heinijoki and received Brewster Buffalo fighters from No. 24 Squadron, while its Fiat G.50 aircraft were transferred to No. 30 Squadron.

During the Soviet summer offensive in June 1944, the squadron operated from Immola, Käkisalmi, and Mensuvaara, conducting defensive operations on the Karelian Isthmus. On 29 July 1944, Major Larjo was shot down and killed, and Major Erkki Metsola assumed command the following day.

=== Lapland War ===
Following the armistice in September 1944, the squadron moved to Onttola. A detachment equipped with Brewster and Fokker aircraft was deployed to northern Finland to conduct operations against German forces, operating from Vaala and later Kemi.

The squadron achieved 111 aerial victories during the Continuation War and Lapland War combined, while losing 16 aircraft and 8 aircrew.

=== Post-war period ===
After the war, on 4 December 1944, the squadron was redesignated No. 23 Fighter Squadron (Hävittäjälentolaivue 23) and based at Rissala. It was equipped with Messerschmitt Bf 109 fighters, which it operated until 1952.

The squadron was disbanded on 1 December 1952 following the dissolution of Flying Regiment 2.

== Aircraft ==
- de Havilland D.H.60 Moth
- Aero A-32
- Bristol Bulldog
- Gloster Gladiator
- Fiat G.50
- Brewster F2A Buffalo
- Hawker Hurricane
- Fokker D.XXI
- Fokker C.X
- Polikarpov I-153
- Blackburn Ripon
- Messerschmitt Bf 109 (post-war)

== Combat record ==
Detailed Finnish records document the squadron's combat operations, including individual aerial victories and losses. The squadron engaged a wide range of Soviet aircraft and conducted both fighter interception and reconnaissance missions. Combat activity was most intense during 1941 and declined during 1942–1943 before increasing again in 1944.

== Bibliography ==
- Keskinen, Kalevi; Stenman, Kari: Suomen ilmavoimien historia 17 – Lentorykmentti 2. Espoo: Kari Stenman, 2001. ISBN 951-98751-0-7
- Keskinen, Kalevi; Stenman, Kari: Suomen ilmavoimien historia 18 – Lentorykmentti 3. Espoo: Kari Stenman, 2001. ISBN 951-98751-1-5
- Keskinen, Kalevi; Partonen, Kyösti; Stenman, Kari: Suomen ilmavoimat 1928–40. Espoo: Kari Stenman, 2006. ISBN 952-99743-0-2
