= No. 14 Squadron (Finland) =

No. 14 Squadron Finnish Air Force
- Active: 30 November 1939 - 13 March 1940; 25 June 1941 - 4 September 1944
- Country: Finland
- Branch: Finnish Air Force
- Role: reconnaissance
- Engagements: Winter War, Continuation War

No. 14 Squadron (Finnish: Lentolaivue 14 or LLv.14, from 3 May 1942 Le.Lv.14), later renamed No. 14 Reconnaissance Squadron (Finnish: Tiedustelulentolaivue 14 or TLe.Lv.14 on 14 February 1944), was a reconnaissance squadron of the Finnish Air Force during World War II. The squadron was part of Flying Regiment 1 during the Winter War and Flying Regiment 5 during the Continuation War.

== Organization ==
=== Winter War ===
- 1st Flight (1. Lentue)
- 2nd Flight (2. Lentue)
- 3rd Flight (3. Lentue)

The equipment consisted of 5 Fokker C.Xs, 7 Fokker C.VEs, and 7 Gloster Gladiator IIs.

=== Continuation War ===
- 1st Flight (1. Lentue)
- 2nd Flight (2. Lentue)
- 3rd Flight (3. Lentue)
- 3rd Flight of No. 30 Squadron (3./Le.Lv.30)

The equipment consisted of 14 Morane-Saulnier MS.406s, 3 Fokker D.XXIs, 2 Westland Lysanders, 1 Fokker C.V, and 1 Fieseler Fi 156.

== Bibliography ==
- Keskinen, Kalevi; Stenman, Kari (2000) [1974]. Fokker D. XXI (Wasp). Suomen ilmavoimien historia (in Finnish). Vol. 3B. Helsinki: Hobby-Kustannus Oy. ISBN 952-5334-03-1.
- Shores, Christopher F. (1969). Finnish Air Force 1918–1968. Aircam Aviation Series. Vol. S2. Canterbury, UK: Osprey Publications. ISBN 0-85045-012-8.
