= No. 12 Squadron (Finland) =

No. 12 Squadron Finnish Air Force
- Active: 30 November 1939 - 13 March 1940; 25 June 1941 - 4 September 1944
- Country: Finland
- Branch: Finnish Air Force
- Role: reconnaissance
- Engagements: Winter War, Continuation War

No. 12 Squadron (Finnish: Lentolaivue 12 or LLv.12, from 3 May 1942 Le.Lv.12), renamed No. 12 Reconnaissance Squadron (Finnish: Tiedustelulentolaivue 12 or TLe.Lv.12 on 14 February 1944) was a reconnaissance squadron of the Finnish Air Force during World War II. The squadron was part of Flying Regiment 1.

== Organization ==
=== Winter War ===
- 1st Flight (1. Lentue)
- 2nd Flight (2. Lentue)
- 3rd Flight (3. Lentue)
- Separate Detachment Salo (Erillisosasto Salo)
- 3rd Flight of No. 14 Squadron (3./LLv. 14, temporary detached in December 1939)

The equipment consisted of 13 Fokker C.Xs, 6 Gloster Gladiators, and 1 Westland Lysander.

=== Continuation War ===
- 1st Flight (1. Lentue) the unofficial flight emblem "Chief Devil Himself" was carried by the Curtiss Hawk 75A aircraft of 1./LLv.12 in 1941. The "Ramming Ram" unit emblem was carried by the aircraft of 1./Le.Lv.12 between 1942 and 1943
- 2nd Flight (2. Lentue) the unofficial flight emblem "Merry Donkey" was carried by the aircraft of 2./Le.Lv.12 between 1942 and 1943
- 3rd Flight (3. Lentue)

The equipment consisted of 6 Fokker C.Xs, 3 Gloster Gladiators, 4 Curtiss Hawk 75As, 12 Fokker D.XXIs, and 4 Blackburn Ripon IIs. By the end of the war the unit also received 20 VL Myrsky IIs, 2 Bristol Blenheim Mk.Is, and 2 Polikarpov U-2s.

== Bibliography ==
- Keskinen, Kalevi; Stenman, Kari (2000) [1974]. Fokker D. XXI (Mercury). Suomen ilmavoimien historia (in Finnish). Vol. 3A. Helsinki: Hobby-Kustannus Oy. ISBN 952-5334-02-3.
- Shores, Christopher F. (1969). Finnish Air Force 1918–1968. Aircam Aviation Series. Vol. S2. Canterbury, UK: Osprey Publications. ISBN 0-85045-012-8.
