= Fokker C.X =

Dutch light bomber/scout aircraft

C.X
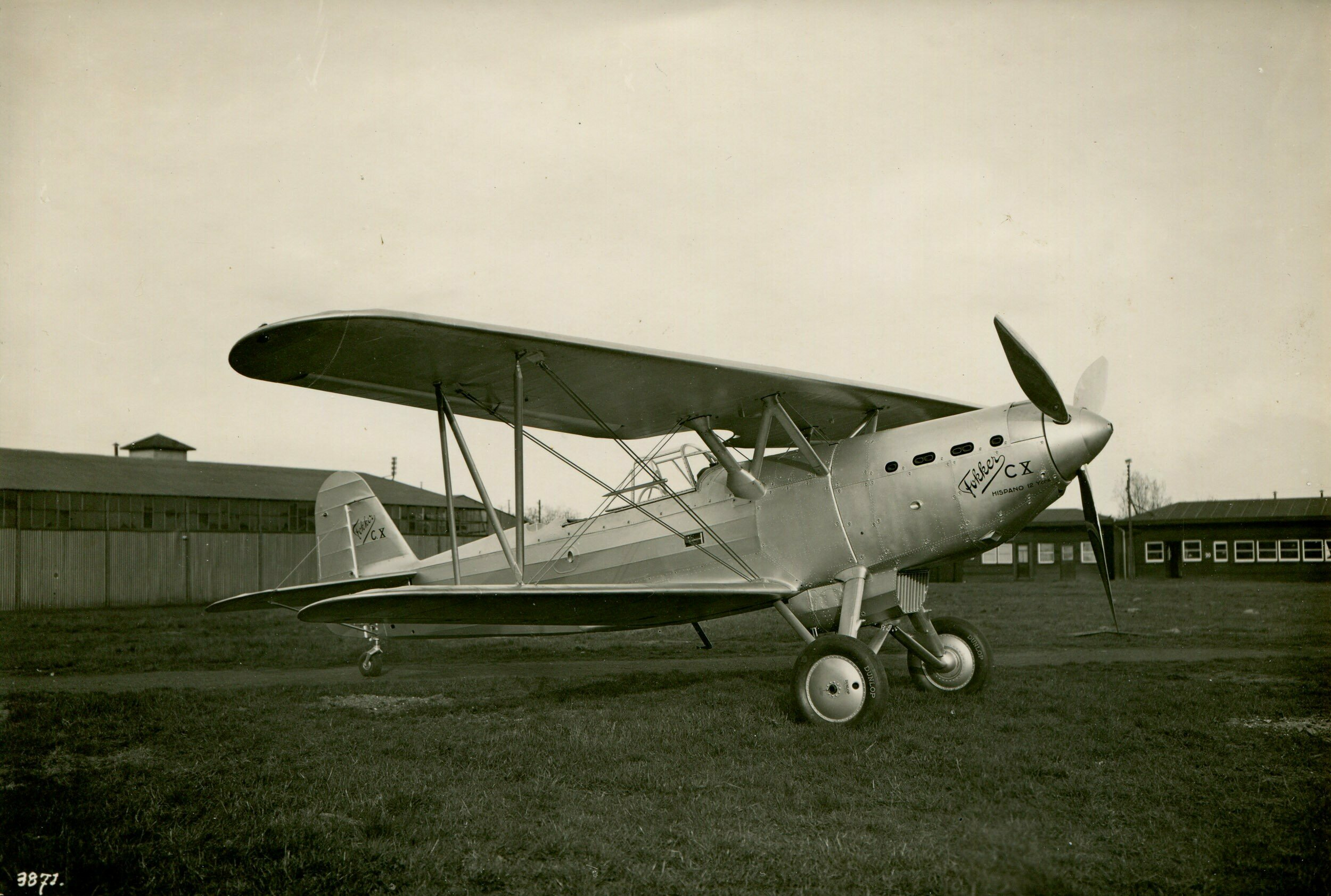
- Fokker C.X with inline engine

General information
- Type: Light reconnaissance, bomber aircraft
- National origin: Netherlands
- Manufacturer: Fokker
- Primary users: Royal Netherlands Air Force Finnish Air Force; Republican Spanish Air Force
- Number built: 74 + 25 units not built in Spain

History
- Introduction date: 1933

The Fokker C.X was a Dutch biplane scout and light bomber designed in 1933. It had a crew of two (a pilot and an observer).

== Design and development ==
The Fokker C.X was originally designed for the Royal Dutch East Indies Army, in order to replace the Fokker C.V. Like all Fokker aircraft of that time, it was of mixed construction, with wooden wing structures and a welded steel tube frame covered with aluminium plates at the front of the aircraft and with fabric at the rear. The prototype was built in 1934 with a Rolls-Royce Kestrel V engine.

The East Indies Army ordered 13 C.Xs, but they were soon replaced in the scout/light bomber role by the American Martin B-10s. Until the Japanese attack on the Dutch East Indies in 1941, the C.X remained in use as a trainer and target tug.

The Dutch Air Force ordered 16 C.Xs, and later four more with Kestrel IIS engines. These four were later re-equipped with Kestrel V engines; the Kestrel IIS proved not very reliable.

Two C.Xs were delivered to the Spanish Republic, and four more to Finland. The Finns also license-produced 35 C.Xs until 1942. These C.Xs were equipped with Bristol Pegasus XII engines.

Airspeed Ltd. in Great Britain got a license to build C.Xs for the British market as the Airspeed AS.22, but no orders were received.

== Operational history ==
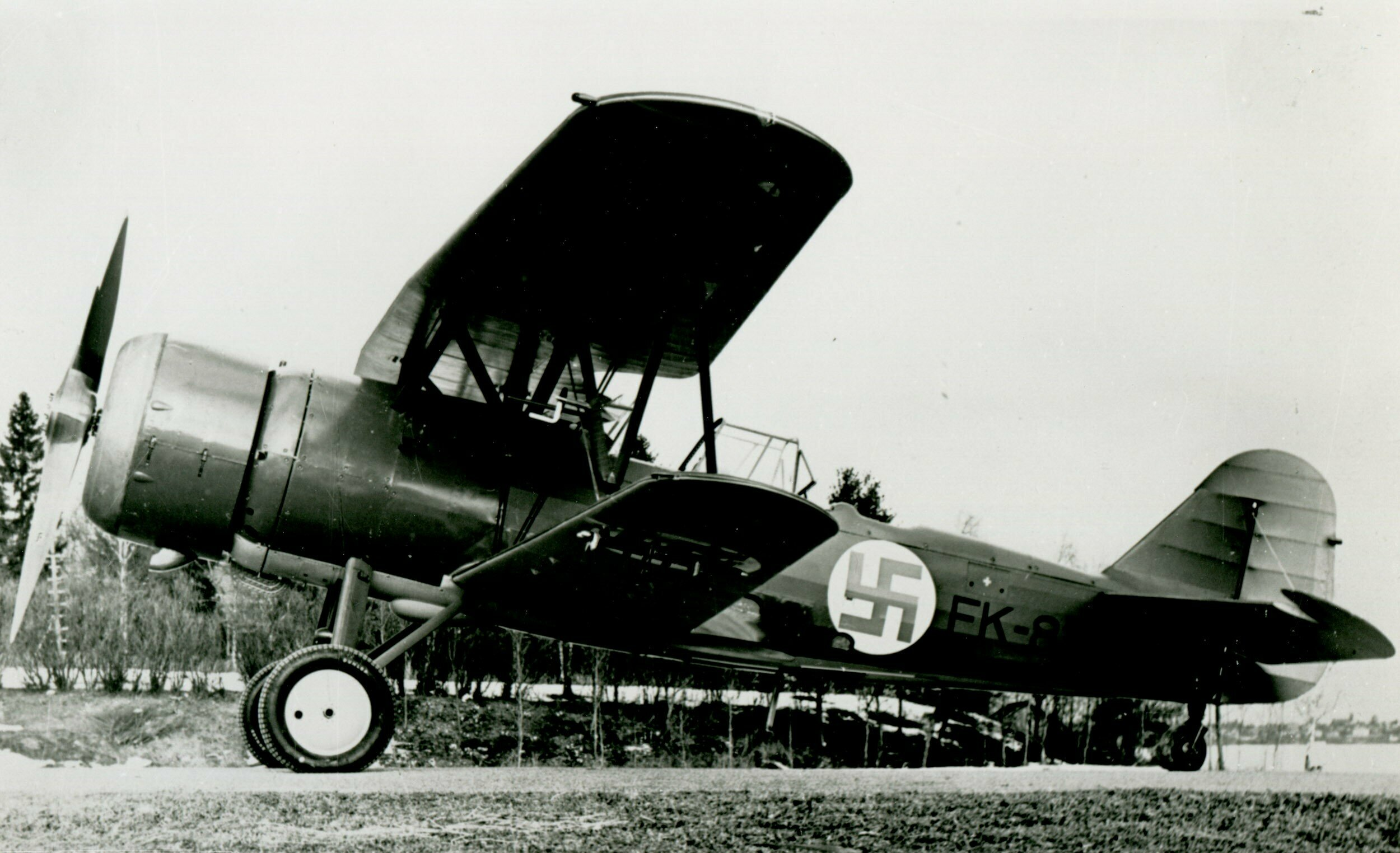
Finnish C.X

During the German attack on the Netherlands in May 1940, the C.Xs served in their intended role as scouts and light bombers. The tactic of "hugging the ground" allowed the C.Xs to achieve some success. Two C.Xs and their crews escaped to France after the Dutch surrender.

The Finnish C.Xs served with distinction in the Winter War, the Continuation War and the Lapland War. The C.X was the most important short-range reconnaissance aircraft and dive bomber of the Finnish Air Force at the outbreak of the Winter War. There were 29 of them in combat units, the "Frans-Kalle" was slow but possessed a robust airframe, making it a useful asset. The maximum dive speed was 540 km/h, which enabled it to break away from the Soviet I-153 and I-16 fighters. As hostilities continued, losses began to mount. During the Winter War 8 FKs were lost. The last of the seven Finnish C.Xs that survived the war crashed in 1958. The craft, designated FK-111, served as a target-towing craft in the Finnish Air Force. The plane crashed into a forest on 21 January 1958, killing the pilot (Second Lieutenant Aimo Allinen) and the winch-operator (2nd Ltn Antti Kukkonen).

== Variants ==
- C.X Series I : Fokker-built aircraft for the Dutch using an inline engine
- C.X Series II : Fokker-built, 4 to Finland
- C.X Series III: Licence-built in Finland, had modified upper wings which were slightly more swept.
- C.X Series IV : Licence-built in Finland, 5 planes which were put together from spare parts.

== Operators ==
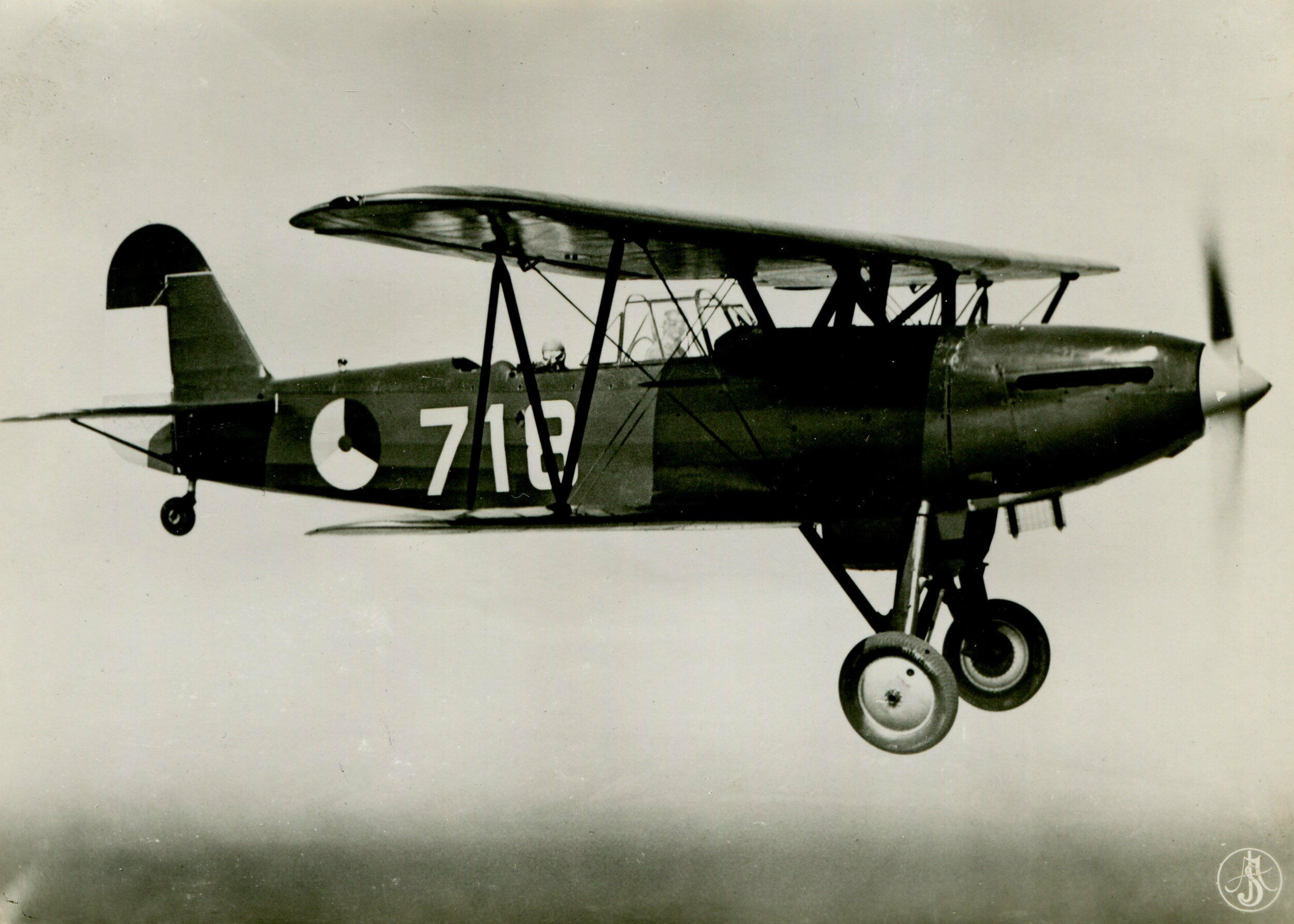
Dutch C.X

Finland

- Finnish Air Force (39)

Netherlands

- Royal Netherlands Air Force (20)
- Royal Netherlands East Indies Army Air Force (13)

Spain

- Republican Spanish Air Force (2)

== Specifications (Fokker C.X) ==
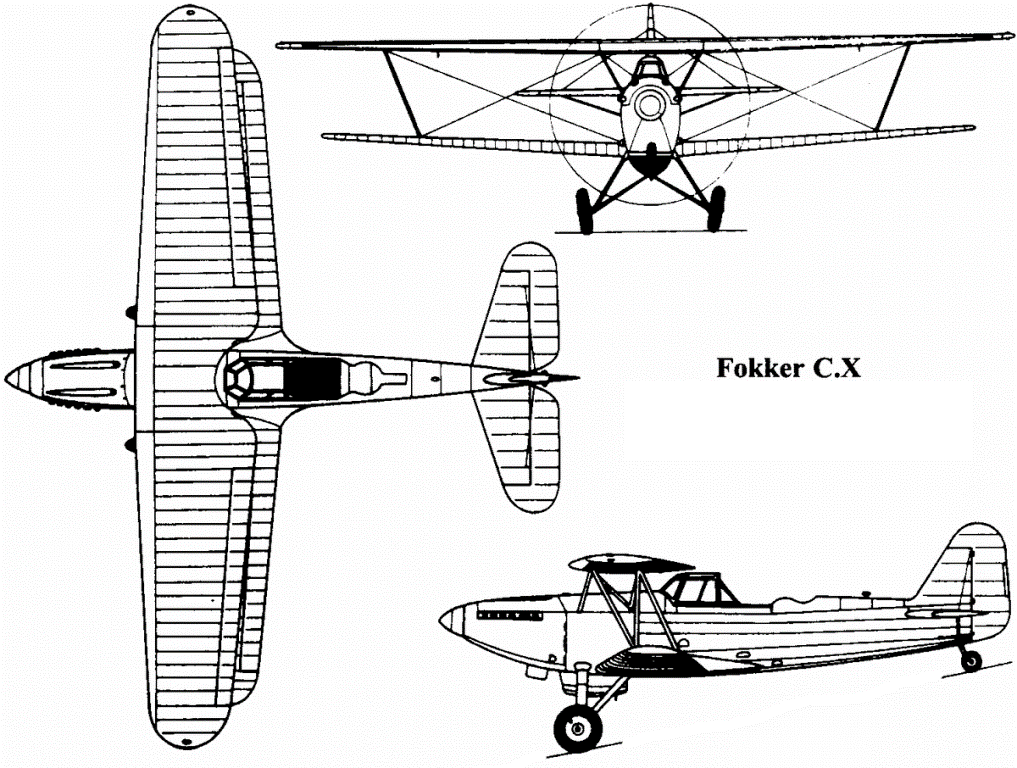

Data from An Illustrated guide to Bombers of World War II

General characteristics

- Crew: Two
- Length: 9.2 m (30 ft 2 in) (Dutch) or 9.1 m (30 ft) (Finnish)
- Upper wingspan: 12.00 m (39 ft 4 in)
- Lower wingspan: 10.50 m (34 ft 5 in)
- Height: 3.30 m (10 ft 10 in)
- Wing area: 31.5 m^{2} (339 sq ft)
- Empty weight: 1,400 kg (3,086 lb)
- Gross weight: 2,250 kg (4,960 lb) (Dutch) or 2,500 kg (5,500 lb) (Finnish).
- Max takeoff weight: 2,900 kg (6,393 lb)
- Powerplant: 1 × Rolls-Royce Kestrel liquid-cooled V-12 (Dutch), 485 kW (650 hp) or 850 hp (630 kW) Bristol Pegasus XII nine-cylinder air cooled radial (Finnish)
- Propellers: 2-bladed

Performance

- Maximum speed: 320 km/h (200 mph, 170 kn) (Dutch) or 340 km/h (210 mph) (Finnish).
- Range: 830 km (520 mi, 450 nmi) (Dutch) or 840 km (520 mi) (Finnish).
- Service ceiling: 8,300 m (27,200 ft) (Dutch) or 8,400 m (27,600 ft) (Finnish).
- Rate of climb: 8.3 m/s (1,630 ft/min)

Armament

- Guns: 2 × 7.9 mm (0.31 in) machine guns fixed in top of front fuselage with a third manually aimed from rear cockpit in Dutch aircraft. Finnish aircraft used same number of 7.62 mm (0.30 in) L-33/34 in same locations.
- Bombs: 2 × 175 kg (385 lb) or 4 × 100 kg (220 lb) bombs on underwing racks

== See also ==
Related lists

- List of aircraft of World War II
- List of aircraft of the Spanish Republican Air Force
