= List of Mannerheim Cross recipients =

List of recipients who were awarded the Mannerheim Cross

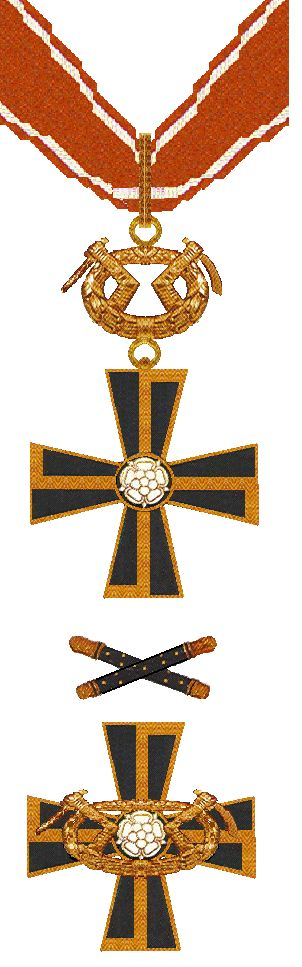
Mannerheim Cross 1st Class (above) and 2nd Class (below). Crossed batons indicate a second award of a 2nd class cross.

The Mannerheim Cross of the Cross of Liberty is the most distinguished Finnish military honour. Proposed by and named after Field Marshal Gustaf Mannerheim, it was introduced after the Winter War on 16 December 1940. The decoration was awarded to soldiers for exceptional bravery, for the achievement of crucially important objectives by combat, or for especially successfully conducted operations. Unlike other awards associated with the Order of the Cross of Liberty, the awarding of the Mannerheim Cross was not influenced by the military rank of the recipient.

The cross is awarded as either Mannerheim Cross of Liberty 1st Class or as Mannerheim Cross of Liberty 2nd Class. No special requirements differing from 2nd class were laid out for the Mannerheim Cross 1st Class. A recipient of the cross is called "Knight of the Mannerheim Cross".

Although still active de jure, no crosses have been awarded since 1945. Tuomas Gerdt, the last living Knight of the Mannerheim Cross, died on 1 November 2020.

== Recipients ==
The Mannerheim Cross 2nd Class has been awarded to 191 people. The first cross was awarded to Colonel Ruben Lagus on 22 July 1941. The first private to be awarded the cross was Vilho Rättö, who was awarded his cross on 3 August 1941 for destroying four enemy tanks with a sightless anti-tank gun taken from the enemy, by aiming the gun through its bore. The last cross was awarded to Lieutenant Colonel Viljo Laakso on 7 May 1945. A total of four persons have been awarded the Mannerheim Cross 2nd Class twice. These double-awardees were given a small clasp, consisting of two crossed marshal's batons, to be worn above the cross. The first recipient of the Mannerheim Cross 1st Class was its namesake, Field Marshal Carl Gustaf Emil Mannerheim, who accepted it together with a Mannerheim Cross 2nd Class from President of the Republic Risto Ryti on 7 October 1941 after all the previous awardees had requested him to accept the award. The only other recipient of the Mannerheim Cross 1st Class is General of Infantry Erik Heinrichs, who received it on 31 December 1944, following an earlier Mannerheim Cross 2nd Class on 5 February 1942.

=== Demographics ===
The awardees were predominately young, with a mean age of 32 years and 72% of the awardees 35 or younger. The three youngest awardees were all aged 19. Only 8 of the recipients were 51 or older, with the oldest recipient being Mannerheim himself. A majority of the knights came from rural families, with only 46 having been born in cities. This is also reflected in the fact that 80 knights' fathers had been farmers. A further 24 had fathers who had worked as either for the railroad or as labourers, while 32 came from families of public servants.

The crosses were awarded primarily to personnel from the army, with 159 recipients in the infantry, 4 in artillery and 2 in engineering units. Seven crosses were awarded to navy personnel, of which two were received by people serving in coastal artillery. Finally, 19 awards were granted to air force personnel. The largest group among army awardees, at 74 people, were those serving as platoon, patrol or squad leaders or in other similar NCO roles. The second largest group were various commanders (from company to corps), who numbered 62. The army rank-and-file were awarded with 22 crosses, and various staff officers with 7 crosses.

Crosses were rarely awarded posthumously. Two people were awarded the cross on the day they were killed, and a further 8 receiving the cross posthumously.

A total of 25 officers, 10 non-commissioned officers and 3 other ranks who had received the cross were killed during the war. Of these 38, 28 were killed in action. Almost half, 12, of those killed in action died during the summer of 1944, with five knights dying during the Battle of Tali–Ihantala. A further three knights were killed during the Finno-German Lapland War, which followed the armistice between Finland and Soviet Union.

Both the first and the last recipient of the cross had a background in the Jaeger Movement. Members of the movement had traveled in secret to Germany in 1916 to receive military training, and returned to Finland at the onset of the Finnish Civil War. Of the 710 people with a jaeger background still working in tasks related to national defence, 20 were awarded with a cross. 115 knights also had a background in the White Guard.

The most distinguished unit was Infantry Regiment 7, the members of which received 11 crosses. A further three awardees had been part of the regiment at some point, but received their crosses after transferring to other units. Also distinguished was the 1st Jaeger Brigade (later Jaeger Brigade, Armoured Division), which had nine of its members receive the cross. Another over-represented group are those involved with long-range reconnaissance patrols, of whom 19 received a cross.

=== Denied proposals ===
A list of people who had been denied a Mannerheim cross by the General Headquarters disappeared from the military archives sometimes after early 1980s, but research by historians Hurmerinta and Viitanen indicates that at least 104 proposals were rejected at this final stage of the process.

In addition, there were plans to award medals for actions from the Winter War. To this end, some 483 names were submitted for consideration between the founding of the award and the start of the Continuation War, but this project was abandoned in April 1944 before any medals could be awarded. At the same time, a total of 19 of those who had been put forth to receive a cross for their actions in the Winter War were awarded for their actions in the Continuation War.

=== List of recipients ===
Image	No.	Name	Rank	Service	Date awarded	Unit	Notes	Refs
	1	Ruben Lagus	Colonel	Army	22 July 1941	5th Division		
	2	Paavo Talvela	Major general	Army	3 August 1941	VI Corps		
	3	Erkki Raappana	Colonel	Army	3 August 1941	14th Division	Proposed second award on 13 August 1944, denied.	
	4	Vilho Rättö	Private	Army	3 August 1941	Gun Company, Infantry Regiment 25		
	5	Antero Svensson	Colonel	Army	16 August 1941	7th Division		
	6	Oiva Tuominen	Sergeant major	Air Force	18 August 1941	No. 26 Squadron		
	7	Juho Pössi	Lieutenant	Army	29 August 1941	III Battalion, Infantry Regiment 27	Also proposed a Mannerheim Cross for actions in Winter War.	
	8	Valde Sorsa	Corporal	Army	1 September 1941	Infantry Regiment 7		
	9	Eero Kivelä	Captain	Army	8 September 1941	III Battalion, Infantry Regiment 27		
	10	Olli Remes	Lieutenant	Army	12 September 1941	III Battalion, Infantry Regiment 54	Olympic skier.	
	11	Aarne Blick	Colonel	Army	14 September 1941	2nd Division		
	12	Aaro Pajari	Colonel	Army	14 September 1941	18th Division	Second award 16 October 1944, while leading the 3rd Division.	
	13	Onni Mantere	Private first class	Army	16 September 1941	Infantry Regiment 16		
	14	Emil Pasanen	Private	Army	26 September 1941	Infantry Regiment 50		
	15	Veikko Vehviläinen	Corporal	Army	26 September 1941	Infantry Regiment 9		
	16	Pentti Iisalo	Second lieutenant	Army	1 October 1941	Infantry Regiment 2		
	17	Taavetti Laatikainen	Major general	Army	3 October 1941	II Corps		
	18	Carl Gustaf Emil Mannerheim	Field Marshal	-	7 October 1941	General Headquarters	Both 1st and 2nd class awarded at the same time.	
	19	Simo Brofeldt	Colonel (medical)	-	7 October 1941	General Headquarters		
	20	Eino Mallila	Sergeant	Army	7 October 1941	Infantry Regiment 3		
	21	Kaarlo Heiskanen	Colonel	Army	7 October 1941	11th Division		
	22	Einar Vihma	Colonel	Army	12 October 1941	12th Division	First proposal 28 September 1941, revised proposal 9 October 1941.	
	23	Väinö Sokka	Corporal	Army	12 October 1941	Infantry Regiment 50		
	24	Tauno Savolainen	Private first class	Army	12 October 1941	Infantry Regiment 3		
	25	Valdemar Kosonen	Corporal	Army	16 October 1941	Infantry Regiment 15	Both original proposal and the official citation reference to Kosonen as a private.	
	26	Matti Varstala	Second lieutenant	Army	16 October 1941	Infantry Regiment 47		
	27	Ahti Heino	Private	Army	19 October 1941	Infantry Regiment 5		
	28	Torsten Korkkinen	Second lieutenant	Army	19 October 1941	Light Section 14, 4th Division		
	29	Arvo Pentti	Lieutenant	Army	19 October 1941	Gun Company, Infantry Regiment 44		
	30	Hans Olof von Essen	Lieutenant colonel	Army	22 October 1941	Uusimaa Dragoon Regiment	First proposed a cross on 2 September 1941, revised proposal on 12 October 1941.	
	31	Soini Mikkonen	Lieutenant	Army	22 October 1941	Infantry Regiment 12		
	32	Oiva Rönkä	Sergeant	Army	22 October 1941	Infantry Regiment 12		
	33	Viljo Salminen	Sergeant major	Air Force	5 November 1941	No. 44 Squadron	First proposal on 13 August 1941 denied, instead awarded Order of Liberty 3rd Class. Revised proposal 23 October 1941.	
	34	Paavo Korpi	Corporal	Army	13 November 1941	Jaeger Battalion 2, 1st Jaeger Brigade		
	35	Tauno Viiri	Captain	Army	13 November 1941	I Battalion, Infantry Regiment 43		
	36	Aarre Voutilainen	Corporal	Army	19 November 1941	Jaeger Battalion 2, 1st Jaeger Brigade.	Also proposed for 1st class medal 26 December 1941; revised proposal 14 January 1942, denied.	
	37	Veikko Saarelainen	Private first class	Army	19 November 1941	Jaeger Battalion 3, 1st Jaeger Brigade		
	38	Eino Wenäläinen	Private first class	Army	19 November 1941	Jaeger Battalion 4, 1st Jaeger Brigade		
	39	Yrjö Tamminen	Corporal	Army	19 November 1941	Gun Company, 1st Jaeger Brigade		
	40	Albert Räsänen	Lieutenant	Army	19 November 1941	Armoured Battalion		
	41	Taavi Törmälehto	Private	Army	19 November 1941	Jaeger Battalion 4, 1st Jaeger Brigade		
	42	Viljo Laine	Sergeant	Army	19 November 1941	Armoured Battalion		
	43	Arvid Janhunen	Private first class	Army	27 November 1941	Infantry Regiment 26	Killed in action 26 November 1941, after proposal was originally submitted; first awardee to be killed.	
	44	Viljo Suokas	Sergeant first class	Army	13 December 1941	Detachment Kuismanen		
	45	Verner Viikla	Colonel	Army	15 December 1941	6th Division	Original proposal missing from archives, killed in action 18 December 1941.	
	46	Toivo Häkkinen	Major	Army	14 January 1942	1st Jaeger Brigade		
	47	Jouko Hynninen	Major	Army	14 January 1942	Jaeger Battalion 3, 1st Jaeger Brigade		
	48	Erik Heinrichs	General of the infantry	-	5 February 1942	General Headquarters	Subsequently, awarded a 1st class cross on 31 December 1944.	
	49	Jorma Hämäläinen	Lieutenant	Army	27 February 1942	Detachment Marttina		
	50	Ilmari Honkanen	Lieutenant	Army	27 February 1942	Detachment Marttina		
	51	Pietari Autti	Colonel	Army	1 March 1942	Infantry Regiment 8		
	52	Martti Aho	Lieutenant colonel	Army	1 March 1942	Infantry Regiment 50	Awarded with another 2nd Class medal on 16 October 1944, while in command of Infantry Regiment 50.	
	53	Teppo Hirvi-Kunnas	Cornet	Army	20 April 1942	2nd Squadron, Häme Cavalry Regiment	Killed in action 10 March 1943, after a cross was proposed but before it was awarded.	
	54	Paavo Kahla	Lieutenant	Air Force	26 April 1942	3rd Flight, No. 16 Squadron	Missing-in-action 23 October 1944; last recipient to be killed in action.	
	55	Rolf Winqvist	Lieutenant	Air Force	26 April 1942	No. 44 Squadron		
	56	Ilmari Juutilainen	Sergeant major	Air Force	26 April 1942	No. 24 Squadron	Awarded another 2nd class medal on 28 June 1944, when with No. 34 Fighter Squadron.	
	57	Jooseppi Moilanen	Sergeant first class	Army	15 May 1942	Infantry Regiment 25		
	58	Mikko Matilainen	Private first class	Army	15 May 1942	Infantry Regiment 8		
	59	Yrjö Kilpinen	Corporal	Army	15 May 1942	Infantry Regiment 13		
	60	Valter Nordgren	Lieutenant colonel	Army	15 May 1942	Infantry Regiment 4	First proposed 4 January 1942; revised proposal submitted 29 April 1942.	
	61	Osmo Laakso	Captain	Army	19 May 1942	Heavy Artillery Battalion 24		
	62	Johannes Hartikainen	Private first class	Army	19 May 1942	Infantry Regiment 60		
	63	Ahti Vuorensola	Captain	Army	19 May 1942	Infantry Regiment 9		
	64	Jaakko Kolppanen	Sergeant	Army	19 May 1942	Infantry Regiment 29		
	65	Sauli Kousa	Staff sergeant	Army	5 July 1942	Infantry Regiment 22	Original proposal 13 October 1941; revised proposal 17 May 1942.	
	66	Kaarle Kari	Lieutenant colonel	Army	5 July 1942	Infantry Regiment 45		
	67	Reino Lukkari	Major	Army	5 July 1942	Group Oinonen	From 12 May 1942 at Onega Group Headquarters.	
	68	Lauri Skyttä	Sergeant	Army	5 July 1942	Häme Cavalry Regiment		
	69	Lauri Nissinen	Second lieutenant	Air Force	5 July 1942	No. 24 Fighter Squadron	First proposed 19 January 1942; revised proposal submitted 13 June 1942.	
	70	Feeli Isosomppi	Sergeant (medical)	Army	17 July 1942	Infantry Regiment 37		
	71	Aarne Ahola	Lieutenant	Army	17 July 1942	I Battalion, Infantry Regiment 58		
	72	Olavi Alakulppi	Lieutenant	Army	17 July 1942	Infantry Regiment 33	Later colonel of the US Army.	
	73	Caj Toffer	Captain	Army	21 July 1942	Infantry Regiment 7	Killed in action 21 July 1942, proposal submitted 23 July 1942, award backdated to date of death.	
	74	Reino Korpi	Lieutenant	Army	9 August 1942	Infantry Regiment 30		
	75	Aaro Seppänen	Lieutenant	Army	9 August 1942	Infantry Regiment 22		
	76	Kaarlo Lehtonen	Second lieutenant	Army	9 August 1942	Infantry Regiment 5		
	77	Hugo Laukkanen	Sergeant first class	Army	9 August 1942	7th Company, Infantry Regiment 16		
	78	Johan Similä	Private first class	Army	9 August 1942	Light Section 5, 3rd Division	–	
	79	Eino Penttilä	Lieutenant	Army	19 August 1942	Border Guard Battalion 6, 14th Division		
	80	Eino Polón	Lieutenant colonel	Army	23 August 1942	Infantry Regiment 30	First proposed on 25 August 1941, denied; revised proposals 25 October 1941 and 21 May 1942.	
	81	Paavo Koli	Lieutenant	Army	23 August 1942	Engineer Battalion 15		
	82	Leo Kojo	Sergeant first class	Army	24 August 1942	Border Jaeger Battalion 4	Official citation incorrectly states date of award as 23 August 1942.	
	83	Kaarlo Laitinen	Sergeant	Army	23 August 1942	Infantry Regiment 8		
	84	Lauri Kokko	Lieutenant	Army	31 August 1942	17th Division		
	85	Paavo Nuotio	Second lieutenant	Army	31 August 1942	I Battalion, Infantry Regiment 4		
	86	Kullervo Sippola	Second lieutenant	Army	31 August 1942	14th Company, Infantry Regiment 28		
	87	Arvo Mörö	Staff sergeant	Army	31 August 1942	Detachment Vehniäinen, Intelligence Division, General Headquarters		
	88	Paavo Suoranta	Staff sergeant	Army	31 August 1942	Detachment Vehniäinen		
	89	Toivo Ovaska	Corporal	Army	31 August 1942	Jaeger Battalion 1, Cavalry Brigade		
	90	Auvo Maunula	Major	Air Force	8 September 1942	No. 28 Fighter Squadron		
	91	Yrjö Keinonen	Captain	Army	8 September 1942	Infantry Regiment 9		
	92	Jorma Karhunen	Captain	Air Force	8 September 1942	No. 24 Squadron		
	93	Tor Lindblad	Lieutenant	Army	8 September 1942	Infantry Regiment 13		
	94	Toivo Korte	Second lieutenant	Army	8 September 1942	Infantry Regiment 12		
	95	Tuomas Gerdt	Sergeant	Army	8 September 1942	12th Company, Infantry Regiment 7	Last recipient alive, died 1 November 2020.	
	96	Albert Puroma	Colonel	Army	18 October 1942	Infantry Regiment 12	Proposal for second award submitted 16 July 1944, denied.	
	97	Sulo Laaksonen	Colonel	Army	6 November 1942	Infantry Regiment 35		
	98	Veikko Karu	Captain	Air Force	6 November 1942	No. 30 Squadron		
	99	Antti Vorho	Staff sergeant	Air force	6 November 1942	Detachment Hartikainen	Long-range reconnaissance patrol leader under General HQ Intelligence. Proposed by Commander of Air Force, citation states unit as No. 14 Squadron.	
	100	Toivo Manninen	Sergeant	Army	6 November 1942	II Battalion, Infantry Regiment 53		
	101	Paavo Paajanen	Corporal	Army	6 November 1942	Light Artillery Battalion 11	First proposal of 19 October 1941 denied by Mannerheim personally, instead awarded Cross of Liberty, 3rd Class. Revised proposal submitted 19 September 1942.	
	102	Arvid Nordin	Corporal	Army	6 November 1942	Infantry Regiment 61		
	103	Bertel Winell	Major general	Army	12 December 1942	8th Division		
	104	Olavi Arho	Commander-captain	Navy	8 March 1943	Minelayer Ruotsinsalmi, Light Naval Detachment		
	105	Osmo Kivilinna	Captain lieutenant	Navy	8 March 1943	Minelayer Riilahti, Light Naval Detachment		
	106	Birger Ek	Captain	Air Force	8 March 1943	No. 6 Squadron		
	107	Niilo Korhonen	Lieutenant	Army	8 March 1943	Infantry Regiment 10		
	108	Toimi Ovaskainen	Master chief petty officer	Navy	8 March 1943	Motor Torpedo Boat Squadron	First proposed 19 November 1941, revised proposal 20 November 1942.	
	109	Harald Storbacka	Sergeant first class	Army	8 February 1943	Infantry Regiment 61	Official citation incorrectly states date of award as 8 March 1943. First proposed 9 October 1941; revised proposal 20 November 1942.	
	110	Einar Schadewitz	Staff sergeant	Army	10 February 1943	Infantry Regiment 7	First proposed 6 November 1941, revised proposal 7 December 1942.	
	111	Jouko Pirhonen	Lieutenant senior grade	Navy	4 June 1943	Motor Torpedo Boat Squadron	Later Commander of the Finnish Navy 1966–1974. Last knight to serve in the Finnish Defence Forces.	
	112	Veikko Leskinen	Lieutenant	Army	4 June 1943	3rd Division		
	113	Leevi Moisander	Sergeant first class	Army	4 June 1943	Light Artillery Battalion 14		
	114	Arvi Liikkanen	Sergeant	Army	4 June 1943	Infantry Regiment 25		
	115	Eino Laisi	Private first class	Army	4 March 1943	34th Gun Company, 4th Division	Proposal submitted 28 September 1941. Official citation incorrectly states date as 4 June 1943.	
	116	Hans Wind	Lieutenant	Air Force	31 July 1943	No. 24 Squadron	Awarded another 2nd Class medal on 28 June 1944.	
	117	Timo Puustinen	Major	Army	1 August 1943	Infantry Regiment 10		
	118	Heikki Nykänen	Lieutenant	Army	1 August 1943	3rd Division		
	119	Onni Määttänen	Sergeant first class	Army	1 August 1943	Detachment Kuismanen		
	120	Mikko Pöllä	Staff sergeant	Army	1 August 1943	Detachment Kuismanen	First proposed 5 December 1942; revised proposal 27 June 1943	
	121	Oiva Tuomela	Sergeant	Army	1 August 1943	Mortar Platoon, II Battalion, Infantry Regiment 25		
	122	Unto Oksala	Sergeant major	Air Force	21 November 1943	No. 44 Squadron		
	123	Lauri Heino	Sergeant	Army	21 November 1943	3rd Company, Armoured Brigade		
	124	Sakari Sandroos	Private first class	Army	21 November 1943	Infantry Regiment 7		
	125	Erkki Korpi	Private	Army	21 November 1943	Infantry Regiment 7		
	126	Kauno Turkka	Lieutenant colonel	Army	16 January 1944	Infantry Regiment 27	Killed in action 17 January 1944, with proposal submitted same date. Award backdated to date of death. Official citation does not mention death and only references actions from the Winter War and the first months of the Continuation War.	
	127	Eino Luukkanen	Major	Air Force	18 June 1944	No. 34 Fighter Squadron		
	128	Auno Kuiri	Lieutenant colonel	Army	19 June 1944	Infantry Regiment 5		
	129	Erik Magnusson	Lieutenant colonel	Air Force	26 June 1944	Flying Regiment 3		
	130	Armas-Eino Martola	Major general	Army	26 June 1944	2nd Division		
	131	Karl Lennart Oesch	Lieutenant general	Army	26 June 1944	Headquarters of the Commander of the Isthmus Forces		
	132	Birger Kvikant	Captain	Army	26 June 1944	1st Company, Assault Gun Battalion, Armoured Division		
	133	Olli Aulanko	Lieutenant	Army	26 June 1944	1st Company, Assault Gun Battalion, Armoured Division		
	134	Kauko Tuomala	Corporal	Army	27 June 1944	8th Gun Company, 3rd Division	Killed in action 26 June 1944, posthumous proposal submitted same day. Award backdated to date of death.	
	135	Eero Leppänen	Major	Army	27 June 1944	Jaeger Battalion 4, Jaeger Brigade, Armoured Division		
	136	Esko Kausti	Lieutenant	Army	1 July 1944	24th Gun Company, 5th Division	Killed in action 24 June 1944, award proposed posthumously.	
	137	Eino Kuvaja	Major	Army	4 July 1944	Infantry Regiment 7		
	138	Eero Seppänen	Private	Army	4 July 1944	14th Company, Infantry Regiment 49		
	139	Gregorius Ekholm	Lieutenant	Army	9 July 1944	III Battalion, 3rd Brigade	First proposed a Mannerheim Cross on 16 July 1943, revised proposal resubmitted 29 June 1944.	
	140	Eino Kiiveri	Private first class	Army	9 July 1944	1st Company, Infantry Regiment 49		
	141	Heikki Kärpänen	Corporal	Army	9 July 1944	Detached Battalion 12	Official citation incorrectly states rank as private first class (Finnish: korpraali).	
	142	Urho Lehtovaara	Sergeant major	Air Force	9 July 1944	No. 34 Fighter Squadron		
	143	Veikko Toivio	Major	Army	9 July 1944	Infantry Regiment 49		
	144	Lauri Törni	Lieutenant	Army	9 July 1944	Jaeger Company, 1st Division	First proposed 23 March 1944; revised proposal 8 July 1944. Later Hauptsturmführer of the SS and major of the US Army; died in Vietnam 1965.	
	145	Ville Väisänen	Private first class	Army	12 July 1944	Border Jaeger Battalion 2	Missing in action 26 June 1944, award proposed 7 July 1944.	
	146	Eino Ripatti	Second lieutenant	Army	12 July 1944	Infantry Regiment 7	First proposed October 1941. Revised proposal submitted 25 May 1944, amended 7 July 1944.	
	147	Erkki Oinonen	Staff sergeant	Army	18 July 1944	Infantry Regiment 30	First proposed January 1942, revised proposals submitted 11 OCtober 1943 and 11 July 1944.	)
	148	Asser Puolamäki	Staff sergeant	Army	18 July 1944	Infantry Regiment 44	Killed in action 15 July 1944; posthumous proposal submitted 17 July 1944.	
	149	Toivo Honkaniemi	Lieutenant	Army	20 July 1944	Infantry Regiment 6		
	150	Martti Nurmi	Staff sergeant	Army	23 July 1944	24th Gun Company, 5th Division		
	151	Tauno Paronen	Captain	Army	22 August 1944	Detached Battalion 24		
	152	Martti Miettinen	Lieutenant colonel	Navy	2 October 1944	Coastal Artillery Regiment 12		
	153	Arvo Veikkanen	Staff sergeant	Army	2 October 1944	Infantry Regiment 2		
	154	Toivo Kirppu	Corporal	Army	2 October 1944	Infantry Regiment 2		
	155	Toivo Ilomäki	Private first class	Army	2 October 1944	24th Gun Company, 5th Division		
	156	Pentti Valkonen	Major	Army	7 October 1944	III Battalion, Infantry Regiment 11	Killed in action 6 October 1944, award proposed following day.	
	157	Wolf H. Halsti	Lieutenant colonel	Army	16 October 1944	Infantry Regiment 11		
	158	Kalervo Loimu	Lieutenant colonel	Army	16 October 1944	Infantry Regiment 53		
	159	Aksel Airo	Lieutenant general	-	18 November 1944	General Headquarters		
	160	Kustaa Tapola	Major general	Army	18 November 1944	5th Division		
	161	Rudolf Walden	General of the infantry, minister of defence	-	2 December 1944	Ministry of Defence	Second oldest knight after Mannerheim. Award proposed by previously awarded generals following a stroke on 27 November 1944. Official citation references no action or reason for the award.	
	162	Adolf Ehrnrooth	Colonel	Army	4 December 1944	Infantry Regiment 7		
	163	Alpo Marttinen	Colonel	Army	4 December 1944	Infantry Regiment 61	Later colonel of the US Army.	
–	164	Arvo Ahola	Major	Army	21 December 1944	Detached Battalion 12		
	165	Allan Anttila	Sergeant	Army	21 December 1944	3rd Squadron, Häme Cavalry Regiment		
–	166	Mikko Anttonen	Sergeant	Army	21 December 1944	III Battalion, Infantry Regiment 49		
	167	Väinö Hämäläinen	Sergeant	Army	21 December 1944	II Battalion, Infantry Regiment 7		
	168	Tauno Iisalo	Captain	Air Force	21 December 1944	No. 44 Bomber Squadron		
	169	Esa Karjalainen	Sergeant first class	Army	21 December 1944	11th Company, Infantry Regiment 44		
	170	Nils Katajainen	Sergeant first class	Air Force	21 December 1944	No. 24 Fighter Squadron		
	171	Timo Koivu	Lieutenant	Army	21 December 1944	7th Company, III Battalion, Infantry Regiment 57	Originally proposed 30 September 1943; revised proposal submitted 4 August 1944.	
	172	Eino Laihiala	Lieutenant	Army	21 December 1944	1st Company, Jaeger Battalion 1, Cavalry Brigade	Originally proposed 1941; revised proposal submitted 10 July 1944.	
	173	Aulis Lehtikangas	Staff sergeant	Army	21 December 1944	9th Company, Infantry Regiment 4		
	174	Vilho Pikkarainen	Staff sergeant	Army	21 December 1944	21st Brigade		
	175	Olli Puhakka	Captain	Air Force	21 December 1944	No. 34 Fighter Squadron		
	176	Jaakko Rytöniemi	Private first class	Army	21 December 1944	32nd Gun Company, 10th Division		
	177	Aarne Salonen	Sergeant	Army	21 December 1944	14th Company, Infantry Regiment 9		
	178	Valter Sipiläinen	Private	Army	21 December 1944	Infantry Regiment 2		
	179	Tauno Suhonen	Private first class	Army	21 December 1944	I Battalion, Infantry Regiment 9		
	180	Pauli Tanttu	Private first class	Army	21 December 1944	I Battalion, Infantry Regiment 1		
	181	Viljo Vyyryläinen	Corporal	Navy	21 December 1944	Coastal Artillery Regiment 22, Coastal Brigade		
	182	Lauri Äijö	Lieutenant	Air Force	21 December 1944	No. 44 Bomber Squadron		
	183	Hjalmar Siilasvuo	Lieutenant general	Army	21 December 1944	III Corps		
	184	Vilho Petter Nenonen	General of the artillery	-	8 January 1945	General Headquarters		
	185	Antti Hänninen	Major	Army	10 February 1945	II Battalion, Infantry Regiment 57		
	186	Jouko Kiiskinen	Captain	Army	10 February 1945	Infantry Regiment 7		
	187	Toivo Korhonen	Lieutenant	Army	10 February 1945	Border Jaeger Battalion 6, 14th Division		
	188	Olavi Linnakko	Lieutenant	Army	10 February 1945	Infantry Regiment 25		
	189	Kaarlo Kajatsalo	Lieutenant senior grade	Navy	10 February 1945	Motor Torpedo Boat Detachment	First proposed 16 October 1943; revised proposal submitted 6 July 1944.	
	190	Kauko Vilanti	Captain	Army	10 February 1945	2nd Company, Infantry Regiment 9		
	191	Viljo Laakso	Lieutenant colonel	Army	7 May 1945	Infantry Regiment 8	Originally proposed 31 July 1941, instead promoted to lieutenant colonel and awarded Cross of Liberty, 1st Class; revised proposal received by General Headquarters on 13 April 1945.	
