= Flying Regiment 5, Finnish Air Force =

- Active: 4 November 1942 -
- Country: Finland
- Branch: Finnish Air Force
- Role: Fighter
- Engagements: Continuation War

Flying Regiment 5 (Finnish: Lentorykmentti 5 or LeR 5) was a mixed fighter and bomber aircraft regiment of the Finnish Air Force during World War II. The regiment took part in the Continuation War and the Lapland War. The regiment was formed around the No. 6 Sqn, which previously had been subordinated the Finnish Navy HQ, and tasked with anti-submarine and maritime patrols. The No. 30 Sqn was a fighter squadron.

The regiment was responsible for the air defence of Southern Finland and of the western Gulf of Finland.

== Organization ==
=== Continuation War ===
- No. 6 Squadron: bomber squadron
- No. 30 Squadron: fighter squadron

After World War II, the regiment and its squadrons were re-organized and the new squadrons were renamed No. 31, and No. 33 Squadrons.

== Aircraft ==
- Tupolev SB
- Dornier Do 22
- Blackburn Ripon IIF
- Polikarpov I-16
- Polikarpov I-153
- Fokker D.XXI
- Hawker Hurricane Mk.I

== Sources ==
- Keskinen, Kalevi & Stenman, Kari: Finnish Air Force 1939-1945, Squadron/Signal publications, Carrollton, Texas, 1998, ISBN 0-89747-387-6
- Keskinen, Kalevi & Stenman, Kari (2004). LeR 5: Erillinen Lentolaivue, Lentolaivue 36, Lentolaivue 15, Lentolaivue 6, Lentolaivue 30. Suomen ilmavoimien historia. Vol. 24. Espoo, Finland: Kari Stenman. ISBN 951-9875-17-4.
- Shores, Christopher F. (1969). Finnish Air Force 1918–1968. Aircam Aviation Series. Vol. S2. Canterbury, UK: Osprey Publications. ISBN 0-85045-012-8.
