= Kyösti Karhila =

Finnish flying ace (1921–2009)

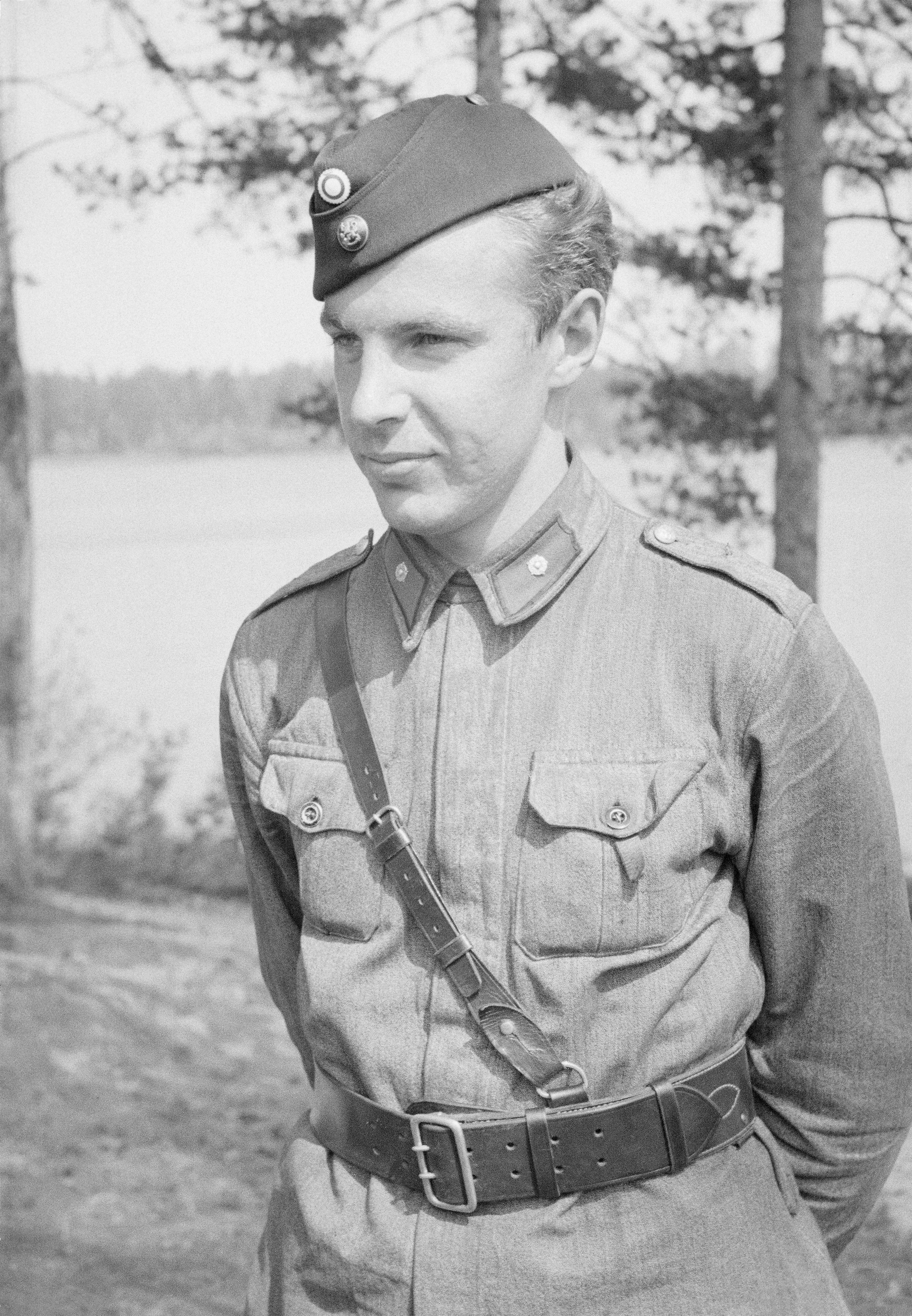
- Born: May 2, 1921; Rauma, Finland
- Died: September 16, 2009 (aged 88); Helsinki
- Military career
- Allegiance: Finland
- Branch: Finnish Air Force
- Rank: Captain
- Nickname: Kössi
- Conflicts: World War II; Continuation War

Kyösti Karhila (May 2, 1921 – September 16, 2009) was a Finnish World War II fighter ace with 32¼ victories. He was born in Rauma, Finland. He began flying in Lentolaivue 32 and flew later in LeLv 30, LeLv 32, LeLv 34 and LeLv 24. He scored 13¼ of his victories with P-36 Hawks and 19 with Bf 109s.

== Biography ==
After the war broke out on the 30 November 1939, Karhila was drafted and posted to Kauhava Air Base for training. On completion of training he was then posted to LeLv 24 at Siikakangas, equipped with the Fokker D.XXI. He was then posted to LeLv 30 on 20 June 1941. In mid-July the unit was re-equipped with the Curtiss P-36 Hawk. Karhila's first air combat was on 31 July 1941, against two Soviet Air Force I-153's.

Karhila transferred to LeLv 34 based at Utti in March 1943, flying the Bf 109G-2. In March 1944 his flight was posted piecemeal into LeLv 30 at Malmi to defend Helsinki, although after the Soviet ground offensive commenced in June 1944 the flight returned to LeLv 34.

After his air force career he flew airliners for Finnair, Aero O/Y and Spearair. He gathered 556 flying hours during the war (in 304 combat sorties) and 24,000 after the war. He died in Helsinki at the age of 88 as the last of the Finnish fighter aces. F18 Hornet of the Finnish Air Force performed a flypast over the city during the ceremony.

== Aerial victories ==
Date	Own aircraft	Place	Enemy aircraft
August 1, 1941	CU-502	Jääski	⅓ balloon
August 10, 1941	CU-567	Kirvu	½ Polikarpov I-16
August 13, 1941	CU-561	Kirvu	½ Polikarpov I-153
August 18, 1941	CU-570	Sintola	1 Polikarpov I-153
September 3, 1941	CU-566	Kuokkala	1 Polikarpov I-153
September 17, 1941	CU-552	Siestarjoki	1 MiG-3
September 19, 1941	CU-560	Ohalatva	1 MiG-1
June 15, 1942	CU-560	Mergino	1 Yak-1
June 28, 1942	CU-560	Vitele	½ Pe-2
July 5, 1942	CU-560	Sampotuksa	1 Polikarpov I-16
August 21, 1942	CU-560	Lyugovitcha	1 Polikarpov I-16bis
September 29, 1942	CU-571	Saarimäki	½ Pe-2
November 9, 1942	CU-571	Mulberskoye	½ MiG-1
November 9, 1942	CU-571	Ylä-Sotkusha	¼ Pe-2
February 9, 1943	CU-560	Saarentaka	1 Pe-2
February 11, 1943	CU-560	Savijärvi	½ LaGG-3
February 11, 1943	CU-560	Novinka	1 LaGG-3
February 11, 1943	CU-560	Malkjärvi	1 U-2
May 4, 1943	MT-214	Ino	2 LaGG-3
May 21, 1943	MT-224	Lavansaari	1 La-5
July 19, 1943	MT-224	Pöytsaari	1 Pe-2
August 20, 1943	MT-229	Seiskari	1 La-5
May 28, 1944	MT-403	Kuusalu, Estonia	1 Pe-2
June 21, 1944	MT-405	Tienhaara	1 Il-2
June 30, 1944	MT-436	Perojoki	1 Yak-9
July 1, 1944	MT-461	Teikarsaari	1 Il-2
July 3, 1944	MT-461	Portinhoikka	1 Il-2
July 4, 1944	MT-460	Vatnouri	1 P-51
July 5, 1944	MT-461	Tuppuransaari	1 Yak-9
July 7, 1944	MT-461	Vatnouri	1 P-51
July 9, 1944	MT-461	Kylä-Paakkola	1 Il-2
July 10, 1944	MT-461	Terhonjärvi	1 La-5
July 10, 1944	MT-461	Uusikylä	1 Yak-9
July 11, 1944	MT-461	Hirvisaari	1 La-5
July 16, 1944	MT-460	Ritasaari	1 Yak-9
July 18, 1944	MT-460	Malkola	1 La-5
July 18, 1944	MT-460	Kylä-Paakkola	1 La-5
CU = P-36 Hawk, MT = Bf 109
