= Birger Ek =

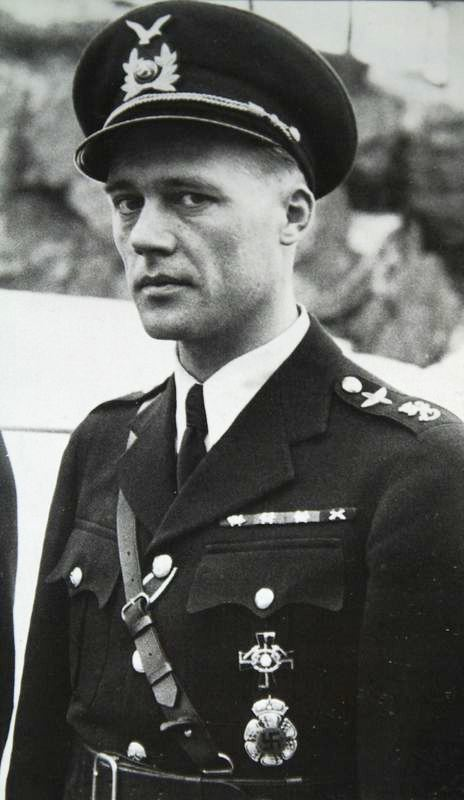
- Born: 23 January 1911; Kymi, Finland
- Died: 7 July 1990 (aged 79); Lahti
- Military career
- Allegiance: Finland
- Branch: Finnish Air Force
- Service years: 1931-1945
- Rank: Major
- Unit: LeLv 6
- Awards: Mannerheim Cross
- Other work: Military attaché

Rolf Birger Ek (23 January 1911 – 7 July 1990) was a Finnish pilot and Mannerheim Cross Knight.

== Early life ==
Birger Ek was born in 1911 to insurance inspector Arthur Ek and Elsa Lundequist and grew up in Loviisa in southern Finland. He married Tyyni Orvokki Puupponen and had two daughters. He began his military career in the early 1930s.

== World War II ==
He participated in the Winter War and Continuation War as a pilot and the commander of the second flight of bomber squadron 6 (2./LeLv). He was appointed the Mannerheim Cross (No. 106) and knighthood on 8 February 1943.

He flew 171 wartime missions, including 29 in the Winter War.

Captain Ek was the first Finnish "Suto" (sukellusveneentorjuntalentäjä), or submarine hunter pilot. He is credited with inventing and refining the method of dropping naval depth charges from aircraft. Immediately at the outbreak of the Winter War, Ek noticed that the small bombs used up to that time to combat submersibles were too weak against the Soviet submarines with their strong pressure hulls. They had to find another way of dealing with them. From a friend in the navy he learned about the depth charges that were in use and managed to get a hold of a few for his experiments. He then proceeded to find out at which heights the aircraft should fly to avoid deflecting depth charges from the surface and still drop the charge without breaking the detonation mechanism upon impact with the water.

The Finnish bombers were equipped with three depth charges, each one set to detonate at different depths. The bomber squadron became quite successful, sinking eight Soviet submarines. Captain Ek was involved in the sinking of four. The Soviets did not manage to find any effective countermeasures during the entire war.

Knowledge of the effective submarine hunting method soon spread around the world. Most navies, up to that point, had been using regular bombs. Upon learning about it, some members of the British House of Commons pressed for the introduction of similar weapons in their aerial submarine hunting forces. This was soon followed by the other Allied forces.

British forces mostly used modified Vickers Wellington aircraft equipped with four depth charges and were used quite successfully against Italian and German submarines.

The most notable difference between the Finnish and Allied methods was that the Allies were able to set the detonation depth just prior the drop, while the Finnish ones were pre-set on ground. This was partly due to the use of less advanced bombers in the naval bombing squadron, and partly due to the shallow depth of the Gulf of Finland where most of the missions were carried out.

Captain Ek flew all of his submarine hunting missions with notoriously unreliable Soviet Tupolev SB-2 aircraft that had been captured, usually without escort. The aircraft had to rely on camouflage and also flew at altitudes of only some 100 meters above the sea to make them more difficult to spot, but in the same time made the use of parachutes, as the means of escape, impossible.

== Later life ==
He was promoted to the rank of major after the war, and pursued a career as the foreign military attaché at the Finnish embassy in Stockholm and subsequently in London.

In the 1960s he could not pay his taxes and decided to go into voluntary exile to the Canary Islands. All his belongings and pension savings were confiscated by the Finnish state, and Ek was forced to obtain loan from friends and relatives to make ends meet.

He returned to Finland just before his death. He is buried at the knight's grove at the Levo cemetery.
