= Lehtovaara =

Lehtovaara is a Finnish surname. Notable people with the surname include:

- Jukka Lehtovaara (born 1988), Finnish football goalkeeper
- Urho Lehtovaara (1917–1949), Finnish military pilot

== See also ==
- Lehtovaara PIK-16 Vasama, a Finnish single-seat plane
