= Valo Nihtilä =

Finnish military officer (1896–1973)

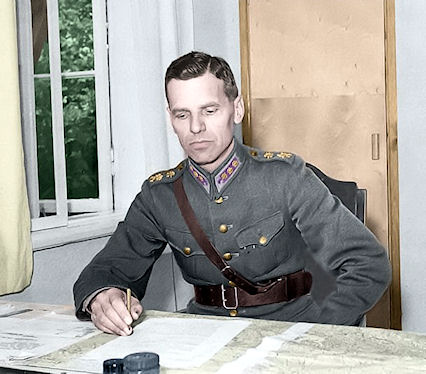
- Born: 27 April 1896; Kärkölä, Grand Duchy of Finland
- Died: 24 October 1973 (aged 77); Helsinki, Finland
- Military career
- Allegiance: Finland
- Branch: Finnish Army
- Service years: 1918–1944
- Rank: Colonel
- Commands: Chief of the Operations Division, Finnish Headquarters
- Conflicts: Finnish Civil War; Winter War; Continuation War

Valo Konstantin Nihtilä (27 April 1896 – 24 October 1973) was a Finnish colonel and one of the central planners of Finnish defence during the Winter War and Continuation War. As head of the Operations Division at Finnish Headquarters, he was among the group of officers who, directly under Marshal Mannerheim, were responsible for planning and executing military operations. After the war he played a key role in what became known as the weapons cache affair.

== Biography ==
=== Early career and education ===
Nihtilä was the son of a farmer and had originally intended to train as an agronomist, but the Finnish Civil War of 1918 set him on a military path. He completed an officer course in Markovilla near Vyborg in 1918, attended the Cadet School in 1921–1922 and the War College in 1927–1929. As an instructor in the art of war at the War College from 1930 to 1936, he taught a large part of the army's senior officer corps — including Taavetti Laatikainen, Ruben Lagus and Adolf Ehrnrooth — in the leadership of troops in combat adapted to Finnish terrain and conditions.

In 1938 Nihtilä became head of the Land Forces Bureau within the Operations Division of the General Staff.

=== Winter War ===
At the outbreak of the Winter War, Nihtilä was appointed head of the Operations Division at Headquarters. In this capacity he was sent to accelerate operations north of Lake Ladoga, where the motti encirclement tactics were planned and set in motion under his direction.

=== Continuation War ===
Nihtilä was promoted to colonel in 1940. After the Winter War, his contribution was significant in the construction of the fortified Salpa Line, which was based on a memorandum on a chain of fortifications that he had drawn up before the war.

During the Continuation War he served first as chief of staff of the IV Army Corps under Lieutenant General Lennart Oesch. He planned and partly led the operations that resulted in the recapture of Vyborg and the war's greatest encirclement victory, the so-called Porlammi motti. He subsequently returned to his post as head of the Operations Division until the end of the war.

Nihtilä held views on the military situation in 1944 and the appropriate response that differed from those of Marshal Mannerheim and Quartermaster General Aksel Airo, but was unable to persuade them to adopt his position.

=== Weapons cache affair and later life ===
Against the background of fears of a possible coup d'état and Soviet occupation, Nihtilä and Lieutenant Colonel Usko Sakari Haahti began organising what became known as the weapons cache affair after the end of the war. The idea of dispersed weapons storage took shape in August 1944, with the aim of establishing 34 reinforced battalions. Nihtilä was arrested in June 1945 and sentenced to five years' hard labour in 1948, but was released on probation after serving three years and four months in custody. According to researcher Pertti Kilkki, Nihtilä sacrificed himself to protect the officers who had worked closely with him.

He was struck off the military register and lost his right to a pension and to wear uniform. He subsequently worked in business and lived in Paris from 1951 to 1954. After his return from France he helped develop the Finnish Defence Forces' new regional defence system.
