= Eino Luukkanen =

Finnish fighter ace

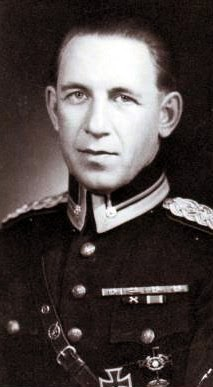
- The Youngest Squadron Leader
- Born: 4 June 1909; Jaakkima
- Died: 9 April 1964 (aged 54); Jyväskylä
- Military career
- Allegiance: Finland
- Branch: Finnish Air Force
- Service years: 1931–1951
- Rank: Lieutenant Colonel
- Nickname: Eikka
- Units: LeLv 24, LeLv 26, LeLv 30, LeLv 34
- Commands: LeLv 30, LeLv 34, LeR 2
- Conflicts: World War II; Winter War; Continuation War
- Awards: Mannerheim Cross

Eino Luukkanen (4 June 1909 – 9 April 1964) was a Finnish fighter ace in World War II. He scored 56 confirmed victories, becoming Finland's third highest ranking ace. He flew the Fokker D-21, Brewster B-239 Buffalo, and Bf 109G.

Luukkanen was born in Jaakkima, Finnish Karelia, on 4 June 1909. His father was a railway employee. Eino grew up in Sortavala on Lake Ladoga.

== Education and flight training ==
Having completed compulsory military training, Luukkanen became a pilot officer in a cadet school course in 1931. He graduated in 1933 and received a commission. Luukkanen was posted as an ensign to the 1st Maritime Squadron in Viipuri. He flew both as a pilot and as an observer. In 1935 Luukkanen was transferred to fighter squadron LeLv 26, equipped with the Bristol Bulldog Mk.IV, a biplane fighter. In 1939 he completed a course of studies in the military academy and was promoted to captain. He was then posted as the commander of the 3rd flight of Fighter Squadron 24 (LeLv24), having been recently equipped with the Fokker D.XXI fighter.

== Fighter pilot ==
=== Winter War ===
On 30 November 1939, the Winter War started against the Soviet Union. The next day Luukkanen scored his first victory, a SB-2 bomber.

On 18 December Luukkanen's Fokker was damaged by friendly fire; and he was forced to land on a rough field, damaging his plane.

On Christmas Eve he shared credit with another pilot for shooting down an R-5 over Summa. Also that day, the 3rd flight was ordered to Värtsilä to provide air cover. During the six weeks at Värtsilä Luukkanen shot down one SB-2 on the 6 January 1940, his last victory in the Winter War. On 4 March, Luukkanen led his flight in a ground strafing attack against Red Army columns on the ice of the Gulf of Finland. The attack was a success, and such ground attacks against enemy columns were the main activity for Squadron 24 up to the end of the war on 13 March 1940.

After the Winter War, Luukkanen had the task of ferrying the newly arrived Brewster 239 fighters from Trollhättan, Sweden to Finland. Squadron 24 was re-equipped with this fighter, and training started immediately.

=== Continuation War ===
The air war started again on 25 June 1941. Luukkanen saw combat again on 8 July. Four BWs under Luukkanen's command had taken off from Rantasalmi and were at 1500 meters over Parikkala when they attacked six I-153s flying at low altitude over the front line. They claimed a total of five victories, but Luukkanen could only confirm one. During 1941 Luukkanen scored five and a half victories and during 1942 claimed nine more. On 11 January 1942, Luukkanen was promoted to the rank of major and posted as the commanding officer of Reconnaissance Squadron 30, flying a mix of Fokker D.XXIs and captured I-153s. The task of the unit was to monitor enemy shipping movements in the eastern Gulf of Finland and the enemy aircraft on the islands of Seiskari and Lavansaari.

On 27 March 1943 Luukkanen was posted as the commander of the recently created Fighter Squadron 34 and equipped with Messerschmitt Bf 109G-2 fighters. By the end of the war, he had logged 441 missions. Luukkanen scored his last victory on 5 August 1944 as he and his wingman each shot down a Yak-9. Altogether Major Luukkanen's unit claimed 345 victories from 29 March 1943 to 4 September 1944 against 30 Messerschmitts lost, 18 of which were in combat. Twelve Finnish pilots were killed, and one taken prisoner of war.

=== Victories ===
Aircraft	Victories
Fokker D.XXI	2.5
Brewster Buffalo	14.5
Messerschmitt Bf 109G	39
Total	56

== After the war ==
Luukkanen wrote his memoirs (published in 1956). These proved a success, with three print runs. His book was translated to English and published in Britain in 1961 and reprinted in the US in 1992 entitled "Fighter over Finland".

After the war, Luukkanen was convicted of spying for Sweden. He retired in November 1951 after he was found guilty of espionage for having handed over some aerial photographs to a man who worked for the Swedish intelligence service.

Luukkanen was one of Finnish leader Carl Gustav Emil Mannerheim's pallbearers when the Marshal died in 1951.

Luukkanen died on 4 September 1964, survived by his widow and his son Risto Heikki, who also had a military career. With his long-time mistress Aino Aunala, Luukkanen also had another son in 1950, future city court Judge Markku Eino Aunala.

Luukkanen is still well known in many Western countries.
