= Urho Lehtovaara =

Finnish Air Force ace

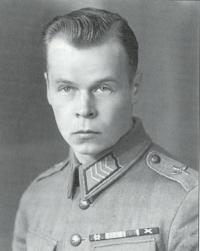
- Urho Lehtovaara
- Born: 27 October 1917; Pyhäjärvi, Grand Duchy of Finland
- Died: 5 January 1949 (aged 31); Suomusjärvi, Finland
- Cause of death: Suicide by gunshot
- Military career
- Allegiance: Finland
- Branch: Finnish Air Force
- Service years: 1937–1946
- Rank: Warrant Officer
- Nickname: "Pikku-Jätti" (Little Giant)
- Units: LeLv 26, LeLv 28, LeLv 34
- Conflicts: World War II; Winter War; Continuation War
- Awards: Mannerheim Cross
- Other work: Cinema owner

Urho Sakari Lehtovaara (27 October 1917 – 15 January 1949) was one of the top scoring Finnish Air Force aces. He was awarded the Mannerheim Cross on 9 July 1944.

In 1949, Lehtovaara killed himself while being interrogated for his suspected involvement in the Weapons Cache Case, a right-wing conspiracy after the ceasefire to stash weapons across the country and form a stay-behind guerrilla army in preparation for a potential Soviet invasion.

== Biography ==
Resident in Salo by 1934, Lehtovaara became a member of the local aero club. Lehtovaara volunteered for military service with the Air Force in 1937. He remained in service as a non-commissioned officer (NCO) with LeLv 26, flying Bristol Bulldog biplanes.

LeLv 26 re-equipped with the Morane-Saulnier MS-406 fighter in late January 1940 and a new squadron, LeLv 28 was created. Sgt. Lehtovaara transferred to the new unit, based on Lake Pyhäjärvi near Turku. On 2 March 1940, Lehtovaara intercepted and shot down an SB-2 bomber, his first victory and his only claim during the Winter War. He was promoted to sergeant on 23 March.

During the Continuation War, he intercepted three DB-3's on 3 July 1941 near Ilomantsi, and shot down two and damaged the third. On 9 July, he shot down two more SB-2's and a MiG-1. LeLv 28 was transferred to Eastern Karelia in late 1941. During 1942, there were few encounters with Soviet aircraft, and Lehtovaara claimed one victory during the year (a DB-3). He flew numerous "train-busting" attacks on the Soviet supply trains using the Murmansk railway. Sergeant Major Lehtovaara was transferred to the newly formed LeLv 34 in April 1943, flying the Messerschmitt Bf 109G-2. On 26 April 1944 he was promoted to the rank of air master sergeant -the highest NCO rank. He was awarded the Mannerheim Cross on 9 July 1944.

Lehtovaara would eventually fly over 400 missions, scoring 44½ victories. He retired from the Finnish Air Force in 1946 and started to run his own cinema at Suomusjärvi near Salo.

Lehtovaara died in very sinister conditions. He had been arrested by Valpo and interrogated about the Weapons Cache Case. He attacked one of his interrogators, grabbed his pistol and committed suicide so that his interrogators would get no information of him.

== Victories ==
Aircraft	Victories
Morane-Saulnier MS.406	15
Messerschmitt Bf 109G	29.5
Total	44.5
