= Lauri Heino =

Finnish soldier (1918–2001)

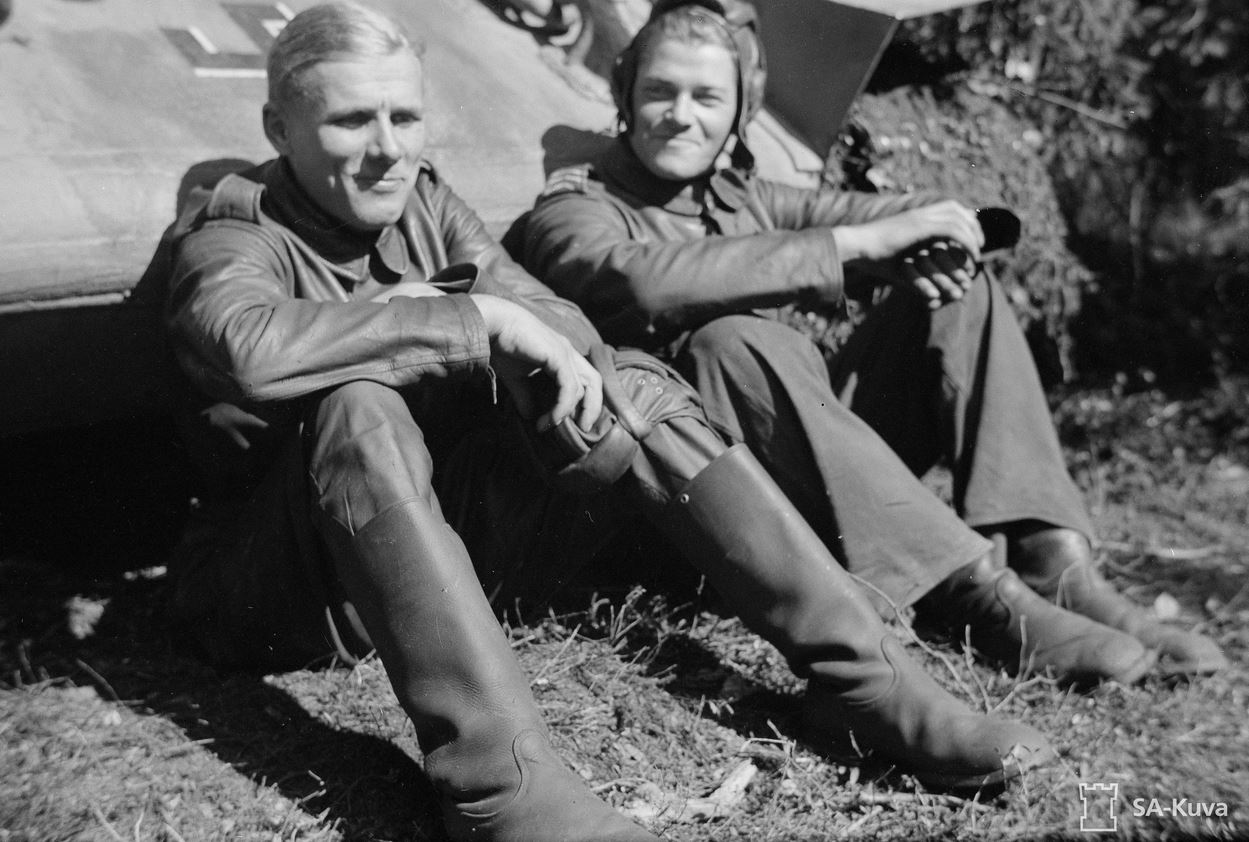
- Sergeant Lauri Heino (left) with Sergeant Matti Virtanen in front of a captured T-34 on 22 July 1944.
- Born: 24 August 1918; Somero, Finland
- Died: 3 February 2001 (aged 82); Somero, Finland
- Military career
- Allegiance: Finland
- Branch: Finnish Army
- Rank: Staff Sergeant
- Unit: Finnish Armoured Division
- Conflicts: Continuation War
- Awards: Knight of the Mannerheim Cross

Lauri A. Heino (24 August 1918 in Somero – 3 February 2001) was a Finnish soldier, awarded the Mannerheim Cross (2nd class) on 11 November 1943. At the time, he held the rank of sergeant and was serving as a tank driver in the 3rd Company, I Armoured Battalion of the Finnish Armoured Brigade.

Heino was the first foreign soldier to capture an intact Soviet T-34 tank and drive it.
