= Erkki Raappana =

Finnish major general (1893–1962)

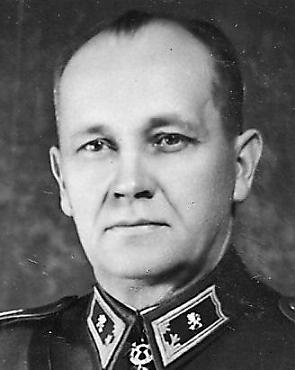
- Major General Erkki Raappana, 1945
- Born: Erkki Johannes Raappana; 2 June 1893; Oulujoki, Grand Duchy of Finland
- Died: 14 September 1962 (aged 69) Joensuu, Finland
- Allegiance: German Empire; Finland
- Branch: Imperial German Army; Finnish Army
- Service years: 1913–1952
- Rank: Major General
- Commands: 2nd Jaeger Brigade 1935–1940; 14th Division 1940–1944; Army Group Raappana 1944–1946; Quartermaster General 1946–1952

Major General Erkki Johannes Raappana (June 2, 1893 – September 14, 1962) was the commander of the 14th Division of the Finnish Army during the Second World War.

Raappana was born in Oulujoki. From 1916 to 1918, he served in the 27th Jäger Battalion, a light infantry unit of the Imperial German Army. In 1918, he took part in the Finnish Civil War as a lieutenant of the White side. Among many of his known accomplishments, General Raappana was chosen to command the Finnish detachment - nicknamed "Group Raappana" ("Ryhmä Raappana" in Finnish) - that was to stop the enemy in the very final Finnish-Soviet battle during World War II. It was the Battle of Ilomantsi, fought during the Continuation War (1941–1944).

The battle lasted from July 26 to August 13, 1944. It ended with a Finnish victory, as the last major Soviet attack against Finland was stopped here. Two elite Red Army divisions were completely routed after a week and a half of fighting, leaving behind over 3,000 Red Army soldiers dead and approximately 100 artillery pieces destroyed.

General Raappana was specialized and experienced particularly in forest warfare. He was awarded the most distinguished military award in Finland, the Mannerheim Cross. After the wars, he was sentenced to six months in prison for his involvement in the Weapons Cache Case. Raappana died in Joensuu, aged 69.
