= Erik Heinrichs =

Finnish military general

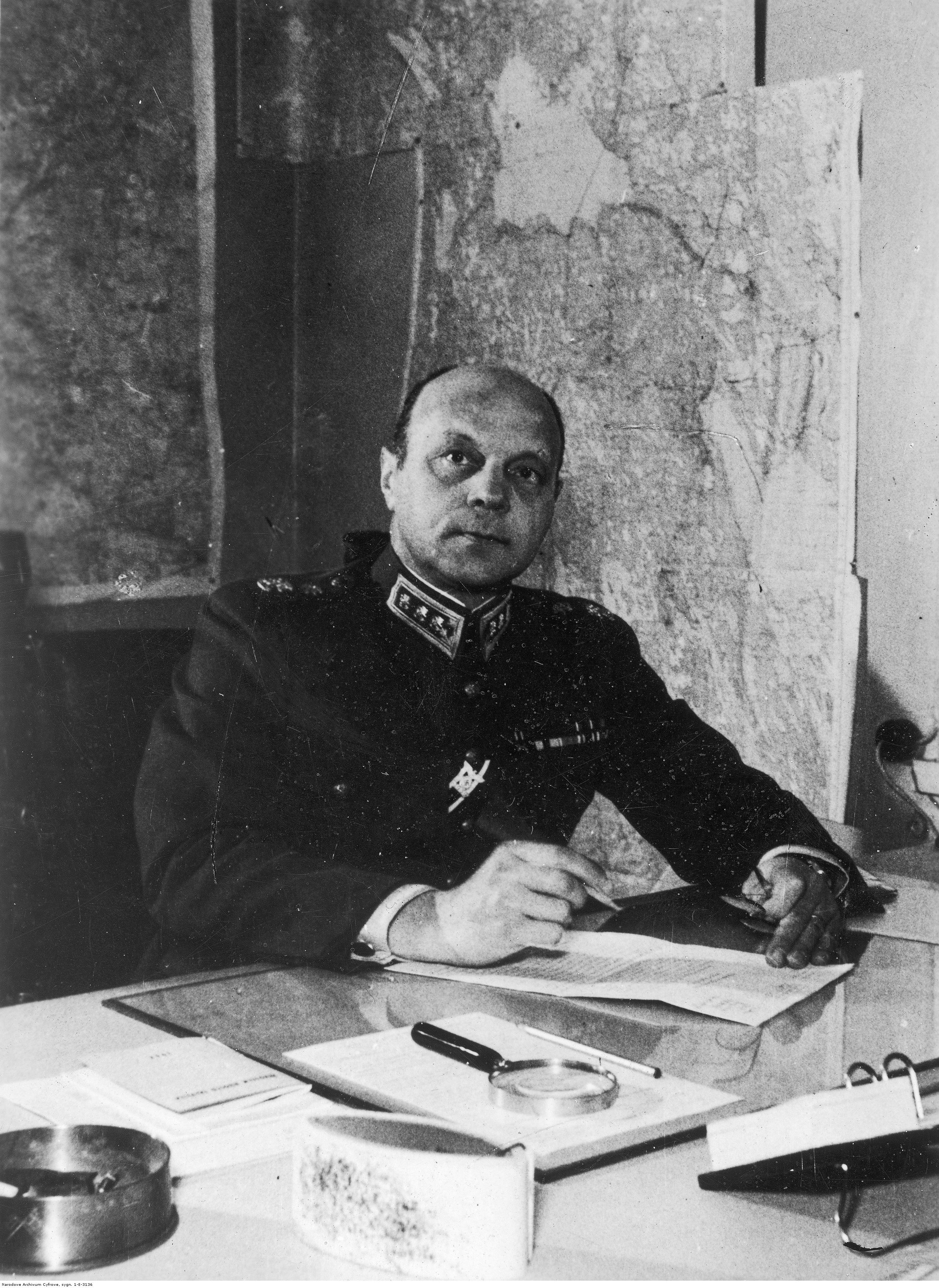
- Army's commander-in-chief Axel Erik Heinrichs
- Born: 21 July 1890; Helsinki, Grand Duchy of Finland, Russian Empire
- Died: 16 November 1965 (aged 75); Helsinki, Finland
- Children: Erik Heinrichs
- Military career
- Allegiance: German Empire (1915–1918); White Finland (1918); Finland (1918–1945)
- Branch: Imperial German Army; White Guard; Finnish Army
- Service years: 1915–1945
- Rank: General of Infantry
- Commands: III Corps; Army of the Isthmus; Army of Karelia; Chief of Defence
- Conflicts: World War I; Finnish Civil War; World War II; Winter War; Continuation War
- Awards: Mannerheim Cross 1st class Mannerheim Cross 2nd class Knight's Cross of the Iron Cross

Axel Erik Heinrichs (21 July 1890 – 16 November 1965) was a Finnish military general. He was Finland's Chief of the General Staff during the Interim Peace and Continuation War (1940–1941 and 1942–1944) and Chief of Defence for a short time after the war (1945).

== Biography ==
Erik Heinrich's grandfather, the ironmaster Anders Heinrichs, was of Swedish descent and originally bore the name Henriksson. The family came to Finland in 1849. Heinrich's parents were Axel Ossian Andreas Heinrichs and Johanna (Hanna) Matilda Rönnholm.

He graduated from the Nya Svenska Samskolan in 1908. He then began studying at the University of Helsinki's Department of History and Philology and then at the Polytechnic Institute. He completed his studies in the spring of 1913 after graduating in general physics from the Department of Architecture at the Polytechnic Institute. He then began working in the newspaper industry, first as an editor and editorial secretary at Dagens Tidning and then at Dagens Press.

Heinrichs went to the Swedish-language co-educational school Nya svenska samskolan. He was one of the Finnish Jaeger troops trained in the volunteer Royal Prussian 27th Jäger Battalion between 1915 and 1918. During the Finnish Civil War he served as a battalion commander in the battles of Tampere and Viipuri. He commanded the III Corps in the Winter War, and from 19 February 1940 the Army of the Isthmus. He was made Chief of the General Staff in June 1940 and promoted to General of Infantry in 1941.

During the Continuation War he commanded the Army of Karelia until January 1942, after which he was again appointed the Chief of the General Staff. After the war he served as the Army's commander-in-chief but was forced to resign because of the Weapons Cache Case. In 1944 Heinrichs became the second person to receive the Mannerheim Cross, First Class. He was also a recipient of the Knight's Cross of the Iron Cross.

Heinrichs was one of the military experts of the delegation sent by president Paasikivi to Moscow for the Agreement of Friendship, Cooperation, and Mutual Assistance in 1948.

After the Continuation War, he was a department manager at the Finnish Association Bank from 1949 to 1952.

Heinrichs was also a praised author of which his book on Gustaf Mannerheim is considered his best. He was made an honorary doctor at University of Helsinki in 1957.

Heinrichs married Maria Emma Augusta Paulig, daughter of Gustav Paulig, in 1921. Diplomat Erik Heinrichs was his son.

== Bibliography ==
- Kring Östersjön. Bilder och betraktelser från jägarnas färder (1918)
- Hotel S:t Petersburg. Några minnen för vännerna från jägartiden (1919)
- Kleber i Egypten. Ett krigaröde från franska revolutionens dagar (1947)
- Mannerheim-gestalten. 1. Den vite generalen 1918-1919 (1957)
- Vid franska atlantkusten i de hundra dagarnas spår (1957)
- Mannerheim-gestalten. 2. Marskalken av Finland (1959)

== Literature ==
- Fellgiebel, Walther-Peer (2000) [1986]. Die Träger des Ritterkreuzes des Eisernen Kreuzes 1939–1945: Die Inhaber der höchsten Auszeichnung des Zweiten Weltkrieges aller Wehrmachtteile [The Bearers of the Knight's Cross of the Iron Cross 1939–1945: The Owners of the Highest Award of the Second World War of all Wehrmacht Branches] (in German). Friedberg, Germany: Podzun-Pallas. ISBN 978-3-7909-0284-6.
- Tapola, Päivi: Kenraalien kirjeet, Tammi, 2007. ISBN 978-951-31-4012-0.
- Mann, Chris & Christer Jorgensen: Hitler’s Arctic War: The German Campaigns in Norway, Finland and the U.S.S.R. 1940–1945. 2002.

Military offices
Preceded by Marshal C. G. E. Mannerheim	Chief of Defence; 1945	Succeeded by Lieutenant General Jarl Lundqvist
