= Erik Heinrichs (diplomat) =

Finnish diplomat (1932–2021)

Hilding Axel Erik Heinrichs (5 June 1932 – 26 April 2021) was a Finnish diplomat. He was a master of political science by education. Heinrichs was the Consul General of Finland in New York City from 1980 to 1985, the Ambassador to Jakarta from 1985 to 1989, as the Negotiating Officer of the Ministry for Foreign Affairs from 1989 to 1991 and the Ambassador to Ottawa from 1991 to 1995.

Heinrichs's father was Finnish general Erik Heinrichs, and he was of Swedish descent through his father.
