= Tuomas Gerdt =

Finnish soldier (1922–2020)

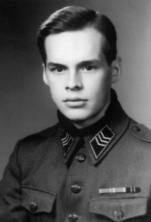
- Born: Kaiho Tuomas Albin Gerdt; 28 May 1922; Heinävesi, Finland
- Died: 1 November 2020 (aged 98); Helsinki, Finland
- Military career
- Allegiance: Finland
- Branch: Finnish Defense Forces
- Rank: Captain
- Conflicts: World War II; Winter War; Continuation War
- Awards: Knight of the Mannerheim Cross

Kaiho Tuomas Albin Gerdt (28 May 1922 – 1 November 2020) was a Finnish soldier and Knight of the Mannerheim Cross, numbered #95. He was born in Heinävesi. Gerdt, serving as a junior runner officer in the infantry regiment 7, was awarded the Mannerheim Cross on 8 September 1942. At that time he held the rank of a sergeant. After coming home from the war on 13 November 1944, Gerdt worked as a manager in Oy Wilh. Schauman Ab and as an office manager in Oy Kaukas Ab and Kymmene Oy. Gerdt, serving as the chairman of the Mannerheim Cross Knight Foundation, was the last living Knight of the Mannerheim Cross.

== Military career ==
When the attack phase of the Continuation War started, Gerdt was serving as the runner of the chief of the machine gun unit. Gerdt had to maintain contact with the chief of his company in severe artillery fire during the Pääsiäisvaara battle on 1 July 1941. He was wounded in the head on the same day, but returned to his unit as a junior envoy officer in August.

During the Mensuvaara battles in August 1941, Gerdt had to maintain contact with the chief of the machine gun unit and the chief of the rifle company in severe conditions and repeatedly had to act independently. Gerdt's exemplary action allowed the rifle company to proceed across a plain that was being heavily bombarded by the enemy. When the enemy made a surprise attack, Gerdt voluntarily went to seek help from the artillery. During the trip, Gerdt was forced to cross a difficult spot of terrain, which was under enemy fire from 10 machine guns, over 10 light machine guns and a submachine gun, while at the same time being bombarded by heavy mortars. With this action, Gerdt saved his company from heavy losses.

During the Sevastopol base battles on the Karelian Isthmus in July 1942, Gerdt served as the runner of the chief of the 12th company of the infantry regiment 7, but also voluntarily participated in the counter-attack. Armed with a submachine gun, he opened a route at the front of the attack, killing several enemies. Gerdt again proceeded at the front when the platoon received a new direction of action. His actions influenced the conquest of the tip of the base. During the battle, Gerdt also took five prisoners.

Gerdt participated in reclaiming the Sevastopol base from the enemy. During the third conflict on 21 July, Gerdt found his superior officer, Captain Caj Toffer, lying severely wounded on a spot of terrain that had been bombarded with grenades. Gerdt carried the mortally wounded Toffer to safety, ignoring the severe and continuous artillery fire. Finnish Commander-in-Chief Mannerheim appointed Gerdt as one of his knights on the same day. Gerdt returned to battle, but was wounded in the face by a bullet the size of a fingertip. In military hospital, Gerdt received news that he had been promoted to Sergeant and awarded the Mannerheim Cross.

Gerdt was sent to Reserve Officer School in Niinisalo after lying in hospital for four months. Gerdt participated in heavy battles in Siiranmäki in June 1944, where he was wounded for a third time. Before being wounded, Gerdt, now having the rank of a Second Lieutenant, commanded a stub-sized platoon, which made successful counter-attacks to drive off the enemy. Gerdt became well in hospital and could return to his regiment after the Äyräpää-Vuosalmi battles. He was sent home on 13 November 1944.

A proposal to award Gerdt the Mannerheim Cross, signed by the chief of the Kannas Group, Lieutenant General Harald Öhquist on 24 July 1942, was sent to the military headquarters as a Creed message. A written proposal, signed by the chief of the 2nd Division, Major General Armas-Eino Martola and confirmed by the chief of the division staff, Lieutenant Colonel Adolf Ehrnrooth, was registered at the military headquarters on 27 July 1942. During the presentation given by the chief of staff, Öhquist's proposal to award Gerdt the Mannerheim Cross was supported. Commander-in-Chief Mannerheim awarded Gerdt the Mannerheim Cross, appointing him as Knight of the Mannerheim Cross #95, on 8 September 1942.

During the Continuation War, Gerdt was promoted from junior sergeant to second lieutenant. He was finally promoted to captain in 1968, serving in the reserve.

== After the war ==
Gerdt married Lea Marjatta Kosonen (1925–2013) on 9 June 1946. They had two children one of which are still in the Mannerheim Säätiö (Foundation) today.

Gerdt worked as the office manager of Oy Kaukas Ab and Kymmene Oy in Lappeenranta from 1971 to 1987. Gerdt has served as chairman of the board of the Mannerheim Cross Knight Foundation since 1998. In the 1940s and 1950s, Gerdt played pesäpallo in Savonlinnan Pallokerho.

President of Finland Martti Ahtisaari started the tradition of inviting all living Knights of the Mannerheim Cross to the Independence Day Celebration in 1994, and since then, the Knights have been the first to arrive to shake hands with the president. In the last few years, Gerdt has been the only Knight in the Celebration, because since 2006, fellow Knight Heikki Nykänen (fi; 1920–2011) could no longer attend the Celebration, because of health problems. In 2008, 2009 and 2010 Gerdt was the only Knight to attend the Independence Day Celebration. Gerdt and his wife Lea were the first to shake hands with President Tarja Halonen. In 2010, Gerdt attended the Celebration without his wife, who was suffering from back pain.

Gerdt intended to attend the Celebration as the only Knight of the Mannerheim Cross also in 2011, but he had to cancel his attendance one day before the event, on 5 December, because his wife had suffered an accident. Gerdt also participated in the National veterans' day celebration on 27 April 2012 in Espoo as the only living Knight of the Mannerheim Cross.

Gerdt died in a hospital in Helsinki on 1 November 2020, at age 98. At this time he had 4 great-grandchildren, the oldest of which (Christofer) will continue carrying on his legacy in the Mannerheim Foundation. On 28 November, a military funeral was held for him and Gerdt was buried in Lappeenranta.

== Sources ==
- Hurmerinta, Ilmari; Viitanen, Jukka: Suomen puolesta, Mannerheim-ristin ritarit 1941–1945. Jyväskylä: Gummerus, 2004. ISBN 951-20-6224-0.
- Hurmerinta, Ilmari (ed.): Mannerheim-ristin ritarit: Ritarimatrikkeli. Mannerheim Cross Knight Foundation, 2008. ISBN 978-952-92-3268-0.
