= No. 6 Squadron (Finland) =

No. 6 Squadron Finnish Air Force
- Active: 25 June 1941 - 5 September 1944
- Country: Finland
- Branch: Finnish Air Force
- Role: maritime bomber
- Engagements: Continuation War

No. 6 Squadron (Finnish: Lentolaivue 6 or LLv.6, from 3 May 1942 Le.Lv.6), renamed No. 6 Bomber Squadron (Finnish: Pommituslentolaivue 6 or PLe.Lv.6 on 14 February 1944) was a maritime bomber squadron of the Finnish Air Force during World War II. The squadron was part of Flying Regiment 5.

== Organization ==
=== Continuation War ===
- 1st Flight (1. Lentue)
- 2nd Flight (2. Lentue)
- 3rd Flight (3. Lentue)
- 4th Flight (4. Lentue)
- 5th Flight (5. Lentue)

The equipment consisted of 5 Polikarpov I-153s, 2 Koolhoven F.K.52s, 14 Tupolev SBs, 3 Dornier Do 22KIs, 2 Marinens Flyvebaatfabrikk M.F.11s, 6 Blackburn Ripon IIFs, 3 Beriev MBR-2s and 1 Heinkel He 59B-2.
