= Hans Wind =

Finnish flying ace (1919–1995)

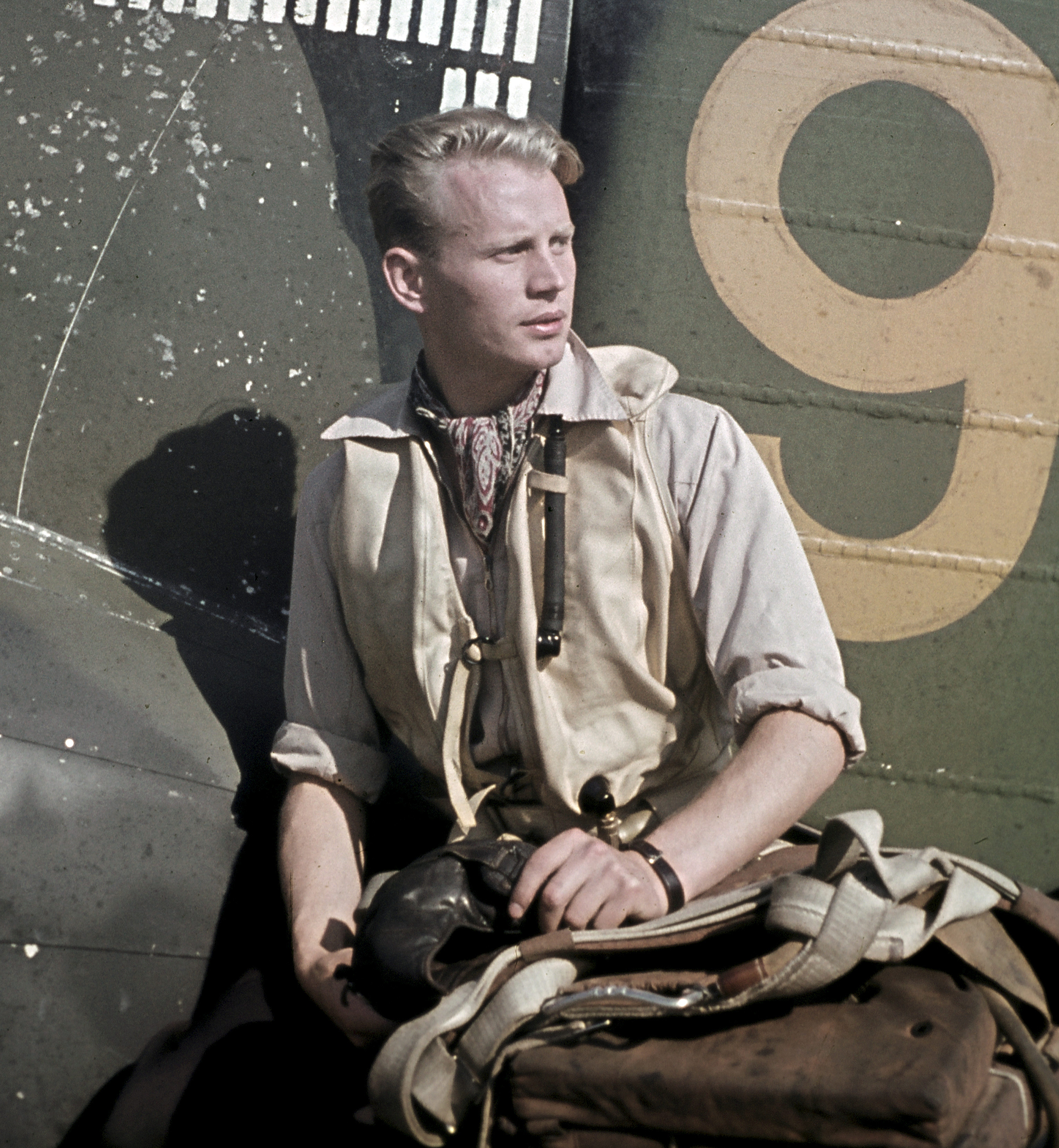
- Born: 30 July 1919; Ekenäs
- Died: 24 July 1995 (aged 75); Tampere
- Military career
- Allegiance: Finland
- Branch: Finnish Air Force
- Service years: 1938–1945
- Rank: Captain
- Nickname: Hasse
- Unit: LeLv 24
- Awards: Mannerheim Cross (awarded twice)
- Other work: Businessman

Hans Henrik "Hasse" Wind (30 July 1919, Ekenäs – 24 July 1995, Tampere) was a Finnish fighter pilot and flying ace in World War II, with 75 confirmed air combat victories. He is one of the four double recipients of the Mannerheim Cross 2nd Class.

== Biography ==
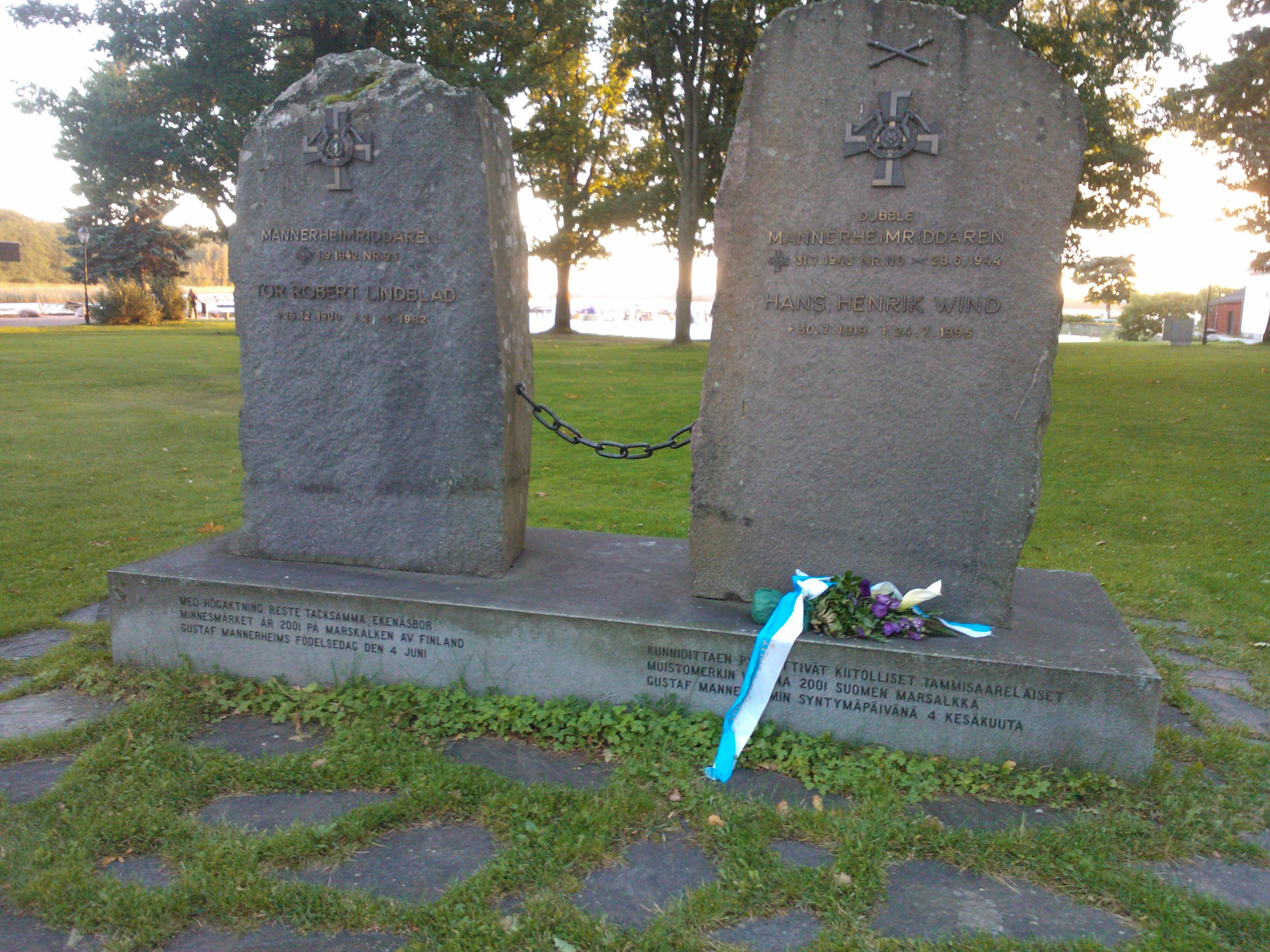
Memorial stone of Hans Wind and Tor Lindblad in Ekenäs, Finland

Wind's parents were Frans Henrik Wind and Elin Irene Rahn.

Wind started his pilot career in 1938 by volunteering to join a pilot training course. He was a reserve officer in the Winter War (1939–1940), but did not fly due to a lack of available planes. Wind had now decided to embark on a military career, and he finished training as a lieutenant on 17 June 1941.

Transferring to LeLv24 in August 1941, he fought in the Continuation War. He flew a Brewster B239 (the export version of the Brewster Buffalo) from 1941 to 1943, claiming 39 of his victories in the type. On 22 September 1941, Wind was credited his first kill, an I-15. In August 1942, the squadron was transferred to Römpötti to operate over the eastern Gulf of Finland. On 14 August 1942, Wind shot down two Hurricanes, and four days later a Hurricane and two I-16s. At the end of 1942, his score stood at 14.5 claims. On 5 April 1943, Wind shot down three Il-2s. On 14 April, Wind claimed two Spitfires, and on 21 April two Yak-1s and shared one with fellow ace Sgt Kinnunen. In August 1943, the unit converted to the Messerschmitt Bf 109G.

Wind was awarded his first Mannerheim Cross on 31 July 1943 and his second on 28 June 1944.

He was promoted to captain on 19 October 1943 when he was 24 years old and was removed from front-line duty in order to instruct new fighter pilots. Wind was considered one of the most skillful aerial tacticians in the Finnish Air Force, and Wind's 'Lectures on Fighter Tactics' were written in 1943 and used in the training of new pilots for decades to come.

Wind returned to the front in February 1944. On 27 May 1944, he scored his first victory with the Bf 109, shooting down two La-5s. A Soviet offensive in the Karelian Isthmus started on 9 June 1944. On 13 June 1944, Capt. Wind led six 109s against a formation of Pe-2 bombers, shooting down four of them. Wind's streak continued in the days that followed; with a P-39 and an IL-2M on 15 June, two Pe-2s and a La-5 the next day, and on 19 June two P-39s (both of the 196 IAP; one flown by Hero of Soviet Union and eventual 29-kill ace Major A. V. Chirkov, who bailed out) and a La-5. On 20 June 1944, Wind added two La-5s, two Yak-9s and a Pe-2. On 22 June, he claimed two Spitfires and a La-5, with two La-5s and two DB-3Fs the next day. On 25 June, he downed three Yak-9s and two Yak-7s.

He was seriously wounded in an aerial battle against some thirty Yak-9s and P-39s on 28 July 1944. Wind shot down one Yak-9 before a 37 mm shell fired by a P-39 exploded against his seat armour. Another shell pierced the armour glass behind his left shoulder, exploding on the instrument panel. Wind was badly wounded in his left arm. He still managed to fly and land at an airfield, even though his plane had been seriously damaged during the attack.

Wind recovered from his wounds, but never flew a combat mission again. He finished the war with a total of 302 combat sorties, scoring 75 kills, and is ranked second on the Finnish aces list.

In 1944 he married Hilkka Maria Saari and in 1945 he began his studies at the Helsinki School of Business, having resigned from the Air Force on 10 May 1945.

Wind died on 24 July 1995 and was survived by his wife and five children.

== Victories ==
Aircraft	Victories
Brewster B239	39
Messerschmitt Bf 109G	36
Total	75
