= Vilho Rättö =

Finnish soldier (1913–2002)

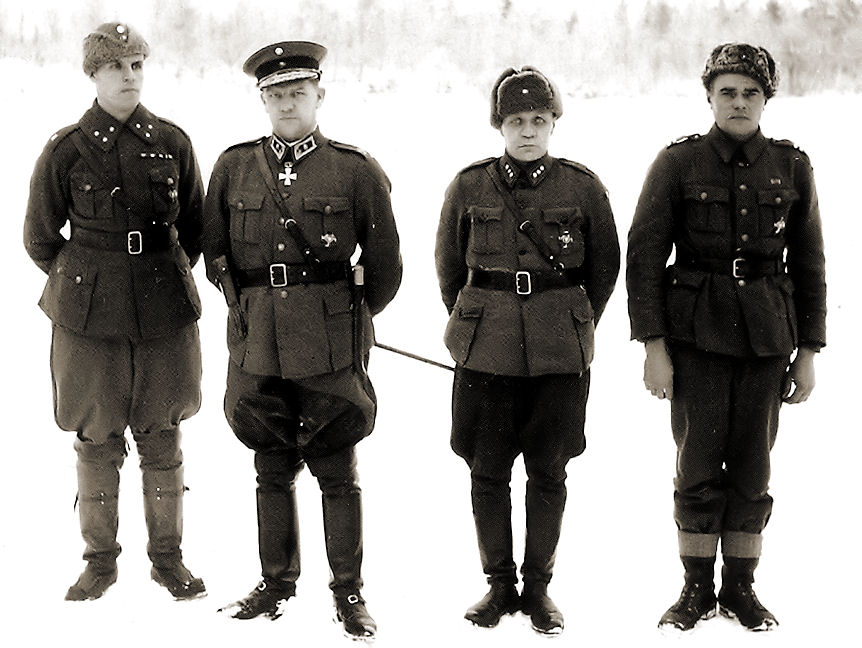
- Knights of the Mannerheim Cross, from left to right: Captain Eero Kivelä (fi), Major General Aaro Pajari, Captain Juho Pössi (fi), Corporal Vilho Rättö
- Born: 10 March 1913; Kanneljärvi, Grand Duchy of Finland, Russian Empire
- Died: 21 January 2002 (aged 88); Anjalankoski, Finland
- Military career
- Allegiance: Finland
- Branch: Finnish Army
- Service years: 1939–1968
- Rank: Staff Sergeant
- Conflicts: World War II; Winter War; Continuation War
- Awards: Knight of the Mannerheim Cross; Medal of Liberty, 1st Class

Vilho Rättö (10 March 1913 – 21 January 2002) was a Finnish soldier, a Knight of the Mannerheim Cross and, in civilian life, a driver and an industrial worker.

Private Rättö was the fourth Knight of the Mannerheim Cross, and the first private to be awarded the high decoration. Then, he was an anti-tank gun gunner in (infantry regiment) JR 27 (fi). The stated reason for this award was the capture of an enemy anti-tank gun and destroying four enemy tanks with it, as well as his valiant actions and resourcefulness in the battle.

Later, he was promoted to the rank of ylikersantti (staff sergeant) in the reserve.
