= Martti Aho =

Finnish military officer

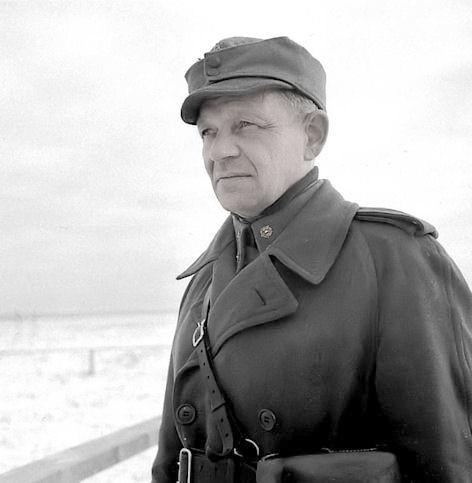
- Aho in 1945
- Born: Martti Johannes Aho; 19 March 1896; Keminmaa, Grand Duchy of Finland, Russian Empire
- Died: 21 June 1968 (aged 72); Kokkola, Finland
- Military career
- Allegiance: Finland
- Branch: Finnish Army
- Rank: Colonel
- Commands: Jalkaväkirykmentti 50; Erillinen pataljoona 8
- Conflicts: Finnish Civil War; Kinship Wars; Aunus expedition; World War II; Winter War; Continuation War; Lapland War
- Awards: Knight of the Mannerheim Cross, 2nd Class (2); Iron Cross, 1st Class (Germany)

Martti Johannes Aho (19 March 1896 – 21 June 1968) was a Finnish colonel. He is one of the four double recipients of the Knight of the Mannerheim Cross, 2nd Class.

== Military career ==
He was born on 19 March 1896 as the son of a farmer.

Martti Aho participated in the Finnish Civil War in 1918 and in the Aunus expedition of 1919–1920. He served in the Border Guard as a company commander before the Winter War and during the war he was first a company commander, and later the commander of Erillinen pataljoona 8 (ErP 8; Detached Battalion 8). Aho was wounded twice during the Winter War.

In the beginning of the Continuation War, Major Aho commanded Infantry Regiment 50 (Jalkaväkirykmentti 50, JR 50), which belonged to the 11th Infantry Division. Due to his skilled command, during the Army of Karelia's breakthrough and the conquest of Petrozavodsk, Aho was rewarded the Mannerheim Cross on 1 March 1942 as knight number 52. During the stationary phase of the war, Aho was stationed at the Svir River with his regiment. He was promoted colonel on 23 June 1944. During the great Soviet offensive the 11th Division was transferred to the Karelian isthmus, where Aho and his regiment participated in the battle of Tali-Ihantala from 27 June. Aho was again wounded in battle on 29 June.

During the Lapland War, JR 50 participated successfully as part of Ryhmä Pajari, fighting the Germans north of Tornio. Aho was again rewarded a Mannerheim Cross on 16 October 1944.
