= Motti =

Motti is a masculine given name, sometimes a short form of Mordecai or Mordechai, and a surname which may refer to:

People:

- Motti Aroesti (born 1954), Israeli former basketball player
- Motti Daniel (born 1963), Israeli basketball player
- Motti Ivanir (born 1964), Israeli football head coach and former player
- Motti Kakoun (born 1972), Israeli retired footballer
- Motti Lerner (born 1949), Israeli playwright and screenwriter
- Motti Malka, Israeli politician and mayor, first elected in 2003
- Motti Mizrachi (born 1946), Israeli multimedia artist
- Alessandro Motti (born 1979), Italian tennis player
- William Motti (born 1964), French retired decathlete

Fictional characters:

- Admiral Conan Antonio Motti, a fictional character from the Star Wars universe
- Motti Wolkenbruch, titular character of the 2018 film The Awakening of Motti Wolkenbruch

== See also ==
- Moti (disambiguation)
- Motty, an elephant
