= No. 30 Squadron (Finland) =

- Lentolaivue 30
- Active: 9 April 1940 – 4 December 1944
- Country: Finland
- Branch: Finnish Air Force
- Type: Fighter squadron
- Role: Fighter operations, maritime reconnaissance, anti-shipping operations
- Part of: Flying Regiment 3 Flying Regiment 5

No. 30 Squadron (Finnish: Lentolaivue 30 or LLv.30, from 3 May 1942 Le.Lv.30, and from 14 February 1944 No. 30 Fighter Squadron (Hävittäjälentolaivue 30, HLeLv 30)) was a fighter squadron of the Finnish Air Force during World War II. The squadron was established on 9 April 1940 and took part in the Continuation War. It was disbanded on 4 December 1944.

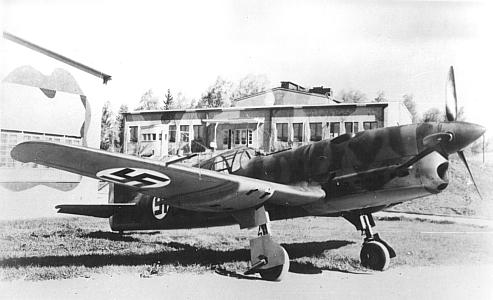
A Caudron C.714, the type originally intended for the squadron.

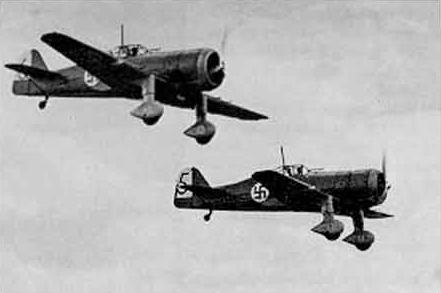
Fokker D.XXI, the squadron's main fighter type in 1941–1943.

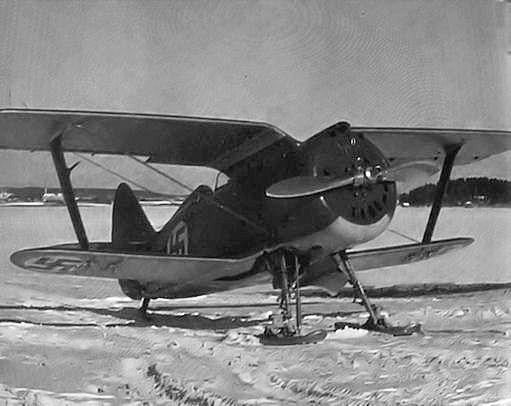
Polikarpov I-153, used by the squadron in 1943–1944.

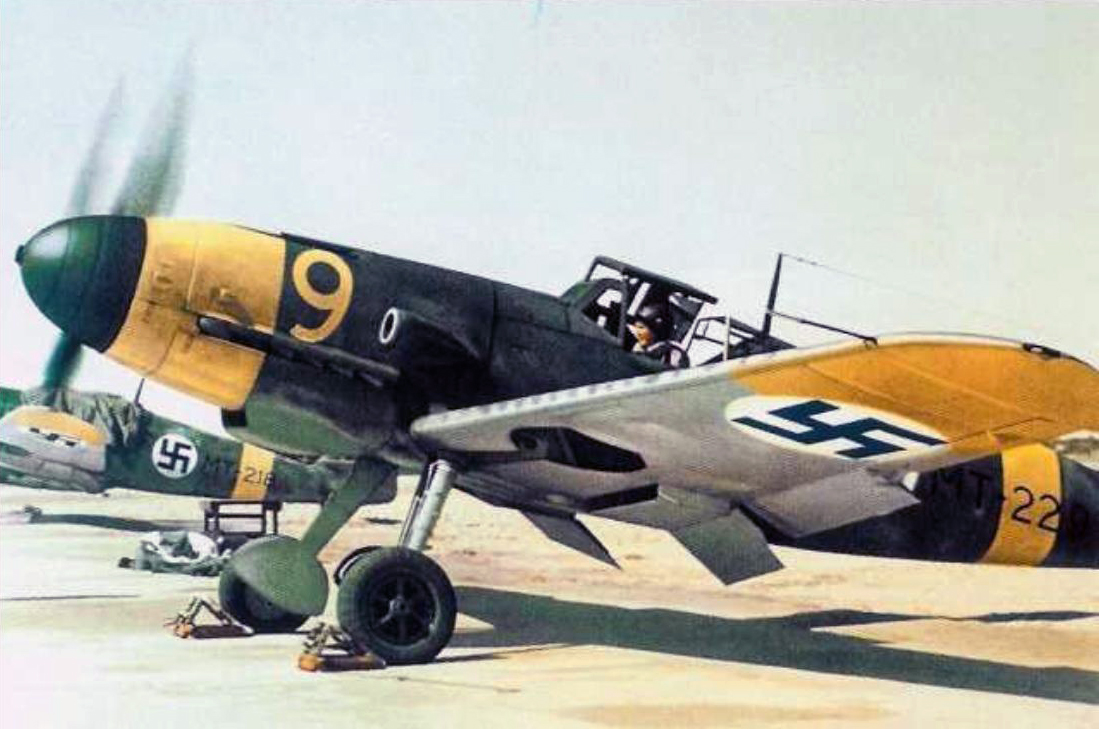
Messerschmitt Bf 109G-2, the squadron's final main fighter type.

== History ==
=== Formation ===
The squadron was formed after the Winter War on 9 April 1940 as part of the new Flying Regiment 3. It was initially intended to be equipped with French-donated Caudron C.714 fighters, but the type proved unsuitable for Finnish conditions. The squadron instead received Hawker Hurricane and Gloster Gauntlet fighters. Before the Continuation War, during spring 1941, the squadron, then based at Siikakangas, was re-equipped with Fokker D.XXI fighters. Captain Lauri Bremer became squadron commander on 26 April 1941.

=== Continuation War ===
==== 1941 ====
At the start of mobilization for the Continuation War, the squadron was deployed at Hollola, Pori and Turku, with the task of protecting troop concentration traffic and industrial targets in the Turku–Lahti–Helsinki–Tammisaari–Turku area. The squadron's deployment on 25 June 1941 was:

- 1/LLv.30 at Hollola with 5 Hurricanes
- 2/LLv.30 at Pori with 12 Fokker D.XXIs
- 3/LLv.30 at Turku with 6 Fokker D.XXIs

On 1 July 1941, the 1st Flight under Captain Kalaja was detached and moved to Utti in support of field army operations southwest of the Vuoksi, forming Detachment Kalaja. Two days later, the squadron headquarters and 2nd Flight moved to Hyvinkää for interception missions over the Gulf of Finland and attacks against light surface vessels, while the 3rd Flight remained at Turku for the air defence of southwest Finland. The squadron achieved its first aerial victory near Turku on 6 July 1941, when Lieutenant Martti Kalima shot down a Soviet SB-2 reconnaissance bomber.

As Finnish ground forces advanced on the Karelian Isthmus, the squadron’s mission shifted to the protection of the Kouvola–Kotka–Viipuri–Upper Vuoksi area as well as Helsinki, Tammisaari and Turku, and by 3 September its main elements had moved to Utti.

==== 1942 ====
On 8 November 1942, Major Eino Luukkanen was appointed commander. By 15 November the squadron had moved to Römpötti and was subordinated to the newly formed Flying Regiment 5. Its mission became submarine search flights and reconnaissance over sea areas east of Lavansaari. The squadron also received captured Soviet fighters, notably the Polikarpov I-153 and Polikarpov I-16.

==== 1943 ====
At the beginning of 1943, the squadron remained at Römpötti. Its 1st Flight still operated Fokker D.XXIs, while the 2nd Flight operated I-153 and I-16 fighters. On 27 February, the 1st Flight transferred its Fokkers to No. 12 Squadron and awaited overhauled captured aircraft. When Soviet air activity increased over the Gulf of Finland, the squadron encountered enemy aircraft more often, but operational strength was often low due to accidents and maintenance problems. At one point, on 1 July, only a single I-153 was serviceable. Captain Toivo Kivilahti succeeded Luukkanen after the latter was transferred to No. 34 Squadron, and Captain Arvo Hassinen later became commander on 25 October 1943.

==== 1944 ====
On 14 February 1944, the squadron was redesignated No. 30 Fighter Squadron. Reorganization began two days later: the 3rd Flight was re-established and took over the I-153 equipment of the 1st Flight, while the 1st Flight moved to Utti to begin conversion training on the Fiat G.50. On 6 March, the 2nd Flight was merged into the 3rd Flight. On the same day, the Bf 109-equipped 2nd Flight of No. 34 Squadron was transferred with its personnel to become the new 2nd Flight of No. 30 Squadron.

The squadron also began preparations for night-fighter operations in response to the bombing of Helsinki. On 26 March 1944 it received five new Messerschmitt Bf 109G-6 fighters, followed by five more a week later. During the spring it fought several engagements against Soviet reconnaissance aircraft. Captain Veikko Karu was appointed commander on 22 May 1944. On 24 September, the squadron moved to Hyvinkää, and five days later it was subordinated to Flying Regiment 3.

=== Disbandment ===
The squadron was disbanded on 4 December 1944, when the Finnish Air Force shifted to its peacetime organization.

== Aircraft ==
The squadron operated the following aircraft during its existence:

- Caudron C.714 (intended, but not adopted operationally)
- Hawker Hurricane
- Gloster Gauntlet
- Fokker D.XXI
- Polikarpov I-153
- Polikarpov I-16
- Fiat G.50
- Messerschmitt Bf 109G-6

== Combat record ==
According to Finnish sources, the squadron achieved 36 aerial victories during the Continuation War while losing 9 aircraft and 6 pilots in combat.
