= Weapons Cache Case =

1944 plans to resist a potential Soviet occupation of Finland

The Weapons Cache Case (Finnish: Asekätkentä, Swedish: Vapengömmoaffären) was a Finnish military plan to continue battle after the ceasefire in 1944, if needed. It concerned a secret and officially unsanctioned military operation following the end of combat on the Soviet–Finnish theater of WWII known as the Continuation War, where a large amount of Finnish Army weapons and equipment was hidden in caches scattered around the country. Despite its non-political nature, the operation took on a right-wing and clearly anti-communist tone through those who participated in the plan.

Ultimately, 1,488 people were convicted for the operation, receiving prison sentences totaling nearly 400 years. Urho Lehtovaara, a suspect, killed himself in custody. Dozens of Finnish soldiers fled the country to avoid prosecution, 21 of whom, including Alpo K. Marttinen, later moved to the United States.

== Background ==
Following the Moscow Armistice of September 19, 1944, two high-ranking officers in the operational department of Finnish Military HQ, Colonel Valo Nihtilä and Lieutenant Colonel Usko Haahti, started planning countermeasures against a possible Soviet occupation of the country. They came up with the idea of decentralized storage of light infantry weapons, so that in case of occupation, an immediate guerrilla war could be launched.

During the demobilization, an organization responsible for hiding the equipment was created and war materiel and other supplies were given to them for safekeeping. Five to ten thousand people participated in the operation. It was planned that they would cache supplies for 8,000 men, but the participants worked so eagerly that it is supposed they hid enough for 35,000 soldiers.

The case started to unravel in the spring of 1945, when Lauri Kumpulainen, a Finnish soldier with left-wing sympathies, divulged the existence of the caches to the Allied Control Commission (ACC). Initially the ACC was eager to follow the case, but after written orders from Nihtilä and Haahti surfaced, they left the investigation to Valpo, the much communist-controlled security police of Finland at the time.

Valpo interrogated more than 5,000 people but failed to completely crack the case and find all the weapons. Most of the weapons were silently returned to army depots, and some were destroyed, but even today when old buildings are demolished, caches turn up every year. The investigators failed to find out how many people participated in the operation, as the participants tended to be reluctant to divulge meaningful information.

While the operation was unofficial, there was no Finnish law under which those involved could be prosecuted. An ex post facto law was passed for the purpose in January 1947. In the end, 1,488 people were convicted, most of them sentenced to 1–4 months in prison. Overall, the prison sentences totaled nearly 400 years. One of the suspects, Urho Lehtovaara, grabbed an officer's pistol and shot himself while under interrogation.

Decades later, in 1980, social democrat Arvo Tuominen, a former Finnish Communist leader, claimed that the weapons cache case was the tipping point which transferred the power within the Finnish Communist movement from the revolutionary to the parliamentary wing, as the communists feared armed resistance against revolutionary takeover. However historian Kimmo Rentola and others consider that Tuominen's claims are to be treated very skeptically.

Several private, unrelated, weapons caches have been found all over Finland after the war. One "famous" cache was created by Lauri Törni and his fellow veterans. This cache included a light machine gun, semi-automatic rifle, 5 submachine guns, 3 rifles, 36 hand grenades and some 2000 rounds of ammunition. The Degtyaryov machine gun was later identified as the president Mauno Koivisto's issue weapon from his war service.

== See also ==
- Alpo K. Marttinen
- Operation Gladio (A post-World War II NATO operation similar to the Finnish case. Gladio allegedly operated in Finland, but the weapons cache case is not thought to be connected.)
- Operation Stella Polaris
- Stay-behind
- War-responsibility trials in Finland
