= Dornier Do 22 =

Torpedo bomber and maritime reconnaissance floatplane

Do 22
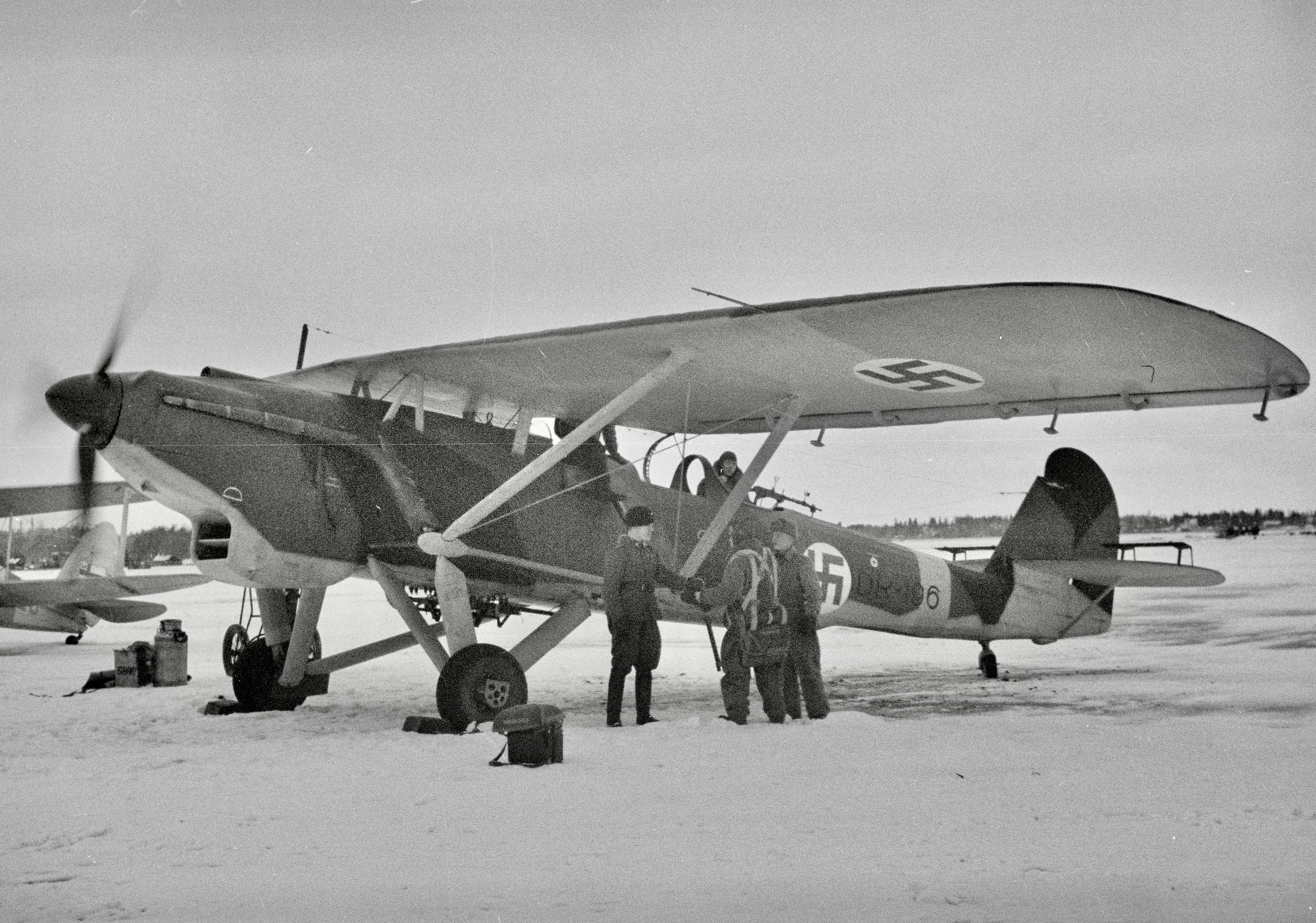
- Dornier Do 22 K in the Finnish Air Force

General information
- Type: Torpedo bomber and reconnaissance seaplane
- National origin: Germany
- Manufacturer: Dornier Flugzeugwerke
- Number built: ~30

History
- Manufactured: 1938–1939
- First flight: 15 July 1938

The Dornier Do 22 was a German seaplane, developed in the 1930s. Despite good performance, it was built only in small numbers and entirely for the export market. The type was operated in the Second World War by Finland, Greece and Yugoslavia.

== Development and design ==
In 1934, Dornier's Swiss subsidiary, based at its factory at Altenrhein, designed a three-seat, single-engined military floatplane, the Do C3; two prototypes were built, with the first flown in 1935.

It was a parasol wing monoplane of fabric-covered all-metal construction. Its slightly swept back wing was attached to the fuselage by bracing struts, and its two floats were braced to both the wing and fuselage. It was powered by a Hispano-Suiza 12Ybrs engine driving a three-bladed propeller, and could carry a single torpedo or bombs under the fuselage. Defensive armament was one fixed forward-firing machine gun, also two in the rear cockpit and one in a ventral tunnel.

The first production model, known as the Do 22/See when fitted with floats, did not fly until 15 July 1938 from Dornier's factory at Friedrichshafen, Germany, although it did incorporate parts made in Switzerland. While the Luftwaffe was not interested in the aircraft, examples were sold to Yugoslavia, Greece and Latvia. In March 1939, a prototype with conventional landing gear (the Do 22L), was completed and test-flown, but it did not enter production.

== Operational history ==
The Greek Do 22s were destroyed during the German invasion of the Balkans in 1941, but the crews of eight of the Yugoslav machines successfully evaded capture or destruction by fleeing to Egypt. There they flew under the control of the British Royal Air Force until the lack of spare parts made the aircraft unusable.

The four Latvian aircraft had not been delivered when the Soviet Union occupied Latvia in 1940, and were retained by Germany. In 1942 they were transferred to Finland, being used on floats or skis until the end of the war.

== Variants ==
Do C3
Prototypes of the Do 22, two built
Do 22Kg
Export version for Greece.
Do 22Kj
Export version for Yugoslavia.
Do 22Kl
Export version for Latvia. Not delivered, but eventually transferred to Finland.
Do 22L
Land-based aircraft, fitted with a conventional landing gear. One prototype only.

== Operators ==
Finland
Finnish Air Force – four Do 22KI
Greece

- Royal Hellenic Air Force

Latvia

- Latvian Air Force

Kingdom of Yugoslavia
Yugoslav Royal Navy – 12

== Specifications (Do 22) ==
Data from German Aircraft of the Second World War

General characteristics

- Crew: 3 (pilot, gunner and radio operator)
- Length: 13.12 m (43 ft 1 in)
- Wingspan: 16.2 m (53 ft 2 in)
- Height: 4.85 m (15 ft 11 in)
- Wing area: 45 m^{2} (480 sq ft)
- Empty weight: 2,600 kg (5,732 lb)
- Gross weight: 4,000 kg (8,818 lb)
- Powerplant: 1 × Hispano-Suiza 12Ybrs V-12 liquid-cooled piston engine, 641 kW (860 hp)

Performance

- Maximum speed: 350 km/h (220 mph, 190 kn) at 3,000 m (9,800 ft)
- Cruise speed: 310 km/h (190 mph, 170 kn)
- Range: 2,300 km (1,400 mi, 1,200 nmi)
- Service ceiling: 9,000 m (30,000 ft)
- Time to altitude: 5,000 m (16,000 ft) in 13 minutes

Armament

- Guns: 2 × 7.92 mm (0.312 in) MG 15 machine guns in ventral and dorsal positions, 1 × 7.92 mm (0.312 in) MG 17 machine gun in the nose.
- Bombs: 1 × 800 kg (1,800 lb) torpedo or 4 × 50 kg (110 lb) bombs

== See also ==
Related lists

- List of aircraft of World War II
- List of interwar military aircraft
- List of military aircraft of Germany
- List of World War II military aircraft of Germany
