= No. 34 Squadron (Finland) =

- Lentolaivue 34
- Squadron insignia ("Eagle fledgling")
- Active: 23 January 1943 – 4 December 1944
- Country: Finland
- Branch: Finnish Air Force
- Type: Fighter squadron
- Role: Air superiority / interception
- Part of: Flying Regiment 3
- Equipment: Messerschmitt Bf 109G
- Engagements: Continuation War

No. 34 Squadron (Finnish: Lentolaivue 34 or LLv.34, from 14 February 1944 Hävittäjälentolaivue 34 or HLeLv 34) was a fighter squadron of the Finnish Air Force during World War II. Formed on 23 January 1943, it became the primary Finnish unit equipped with the Messerschmitt Bf 109 and played a decisive role in air combat during the later stages of the Continuation War. The squadron achieved 345 confirmed aerial victories, the highest total of any Finnish Air Force unit, making it one of the most successful fighter squadrons of the war relative to its size.

== History ==
=== Formation and purpose ===
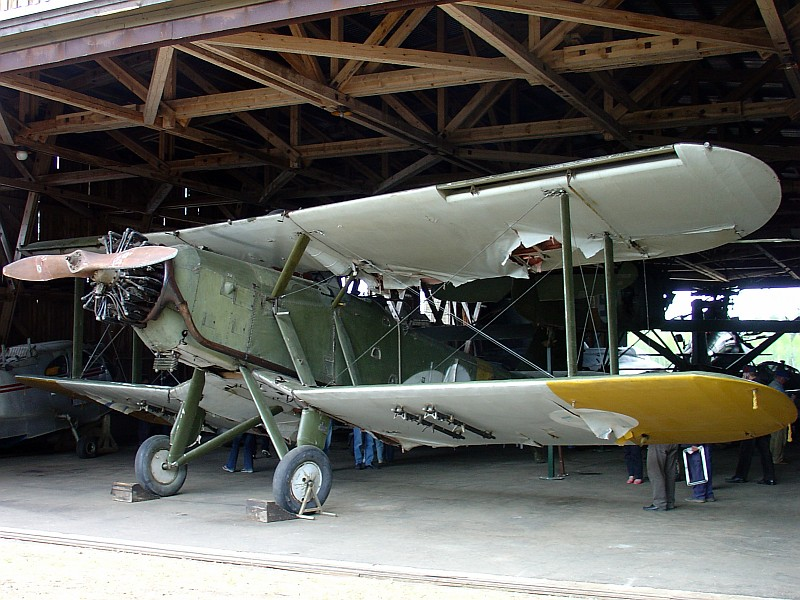
Blackburn Ripon IIF

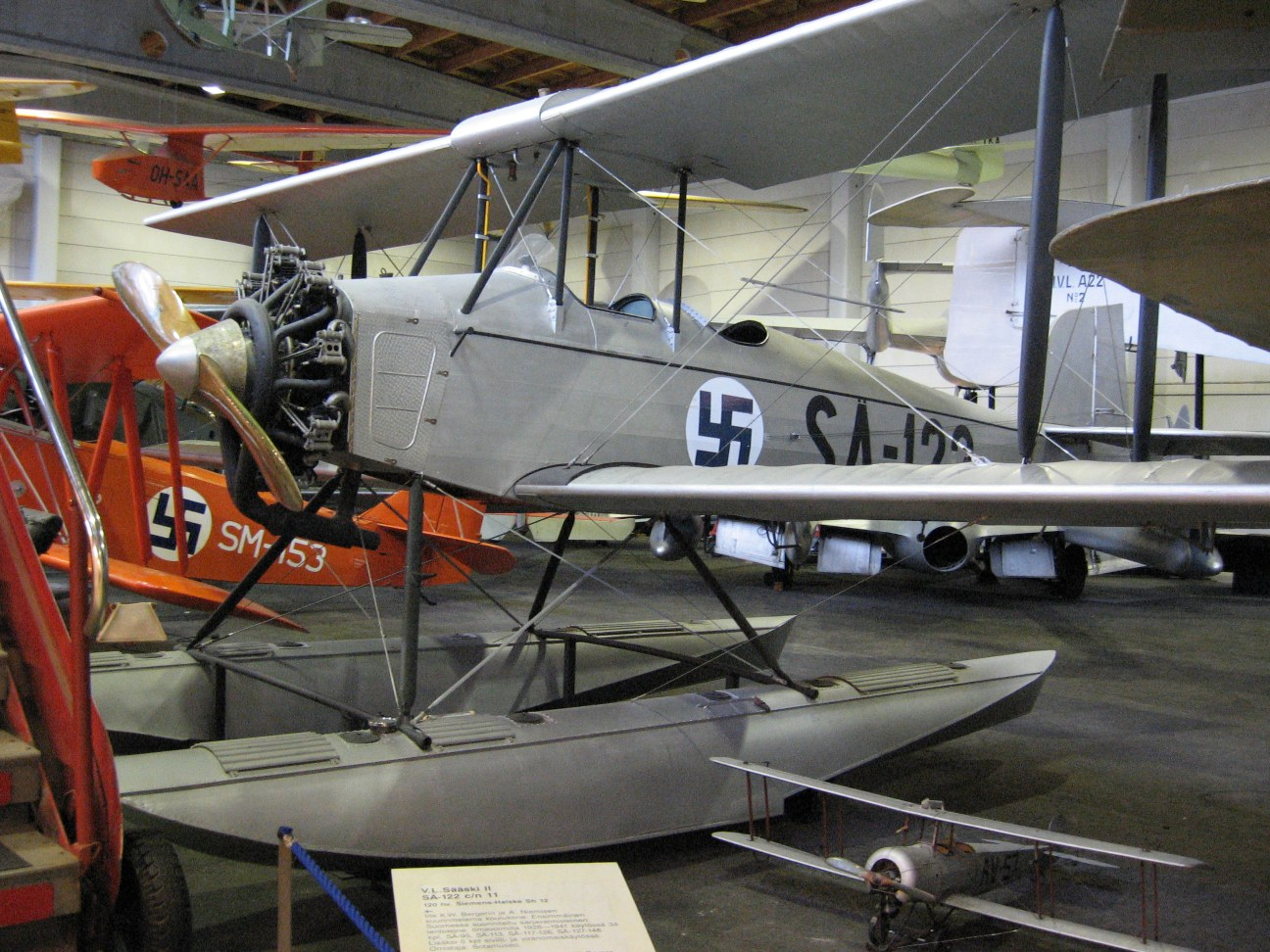
VL Sääski II

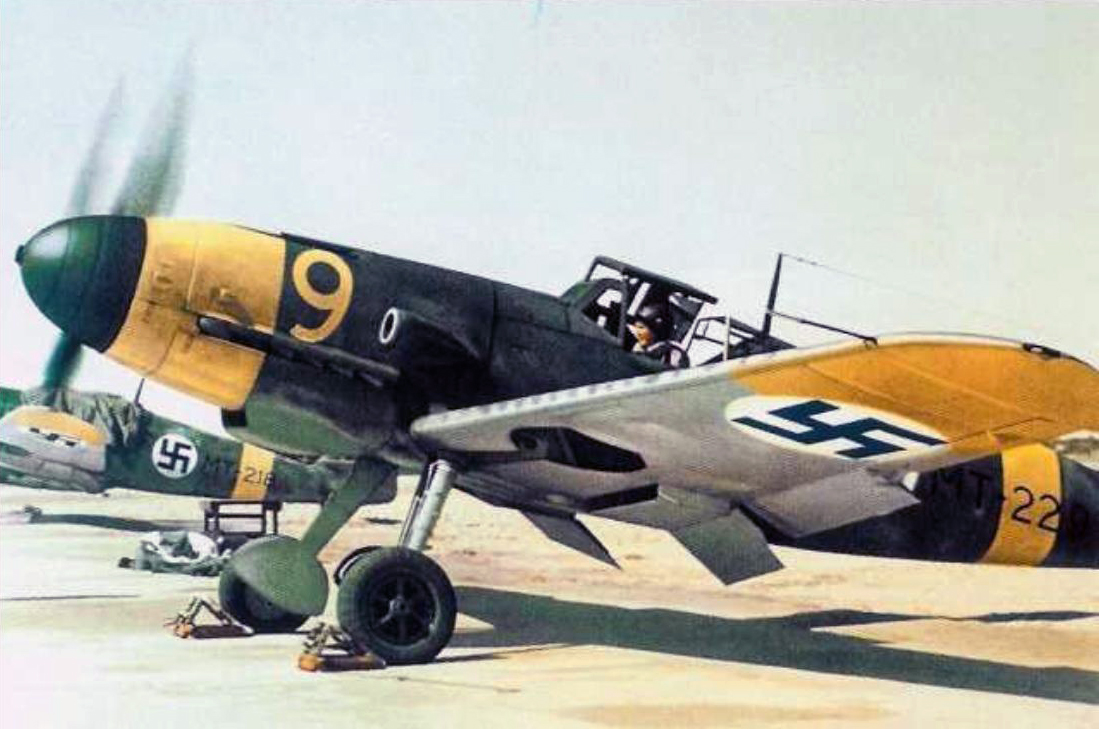
Messerschmitt Bf 109G-2

No. 34 Squadron was established as part of a major modernization of the Finnish Air Force in early 1943. The unit was specifically created to operate the newly acquired German Messerschmitt Bf 109 fighters, which represented a significant technological leap compared to earlier Finnish aircraft. Experienced pilots were transferred from other squadrons, particularly from No. 24 Squadron and No. 32 Squadron, forming a highly capable unit from the outset. The creation of the squadron marked a shift toward concentrating modern aircraft and experienced pilots into fewer, more effective units.

=== Operations in 1943 ===
The squadron initially operated the Messerschmitt Bf 109G-2 variant, later supplemented by Messerschmitt Bf 109G-6 fighters. These aircraft provided superior speed, climb rate and firepower compared to earlier types used by the Finnish Air Force. Throughout 1943, the squadron conducted interception missions against Soviet aircraft over the Karelian Isthmus and surrounding areas. The combination of advanced aircraft and experienced pilots resulted in high combat effectiveness.

=== Operations during the Soviet offensive (1944) ===
During the major Soviet offensive in June 1944, the squadron played a critical role in defending Finnish airspace and supporting ground forces. The introduction of modern Soviet fighters such as the Lavochkin La-5 and Yakovlev Yak-9 increased the intensity of air combat. Despite this, the squadron maintained a high level of effectiveness, largely due to the performance of the Bf 109 and the experience of its pilots. The squadron’s operations during this period included:

- interception of bomber formations
- fighter sweeps
- defensive air patrols
- support of ground forces

These efforts contributed significantly to limiting Soviet air superiority during the most critical phase of the war.

=== Tactical role and doctrine ===
No. 34 Squadron functioned as a centralized high-performance interceptor unit, concentrating Finland’s most advanced aircraft and many of its most skilled pilots. Its doctrine emphasized:

- altitude advantage
- coordinated attacks
- rapid engagement and disengagement

This approach enabled the squadron to achieve a high victory-to-loss ratio.

=== Disbandment and legacy ===
Following the armistice in September 1944, the squadron was reorganized as part of the Finnish Air Force’s transition to peacetime structure. On 4 December 1944, it was redesignated No. 33 Squadron. Its combat record remains one of the most notable in Finnish aviation history.

== Organization ==
=== Continuation War ===
- 1st Flight (1. Lentue)
- 2nd Flight (2. Lentue)
- 3rd Flight (3. Lentue)

== Aircraft ==
The squadron operated:

- Messerschmitt Bf 109G-2
- Messerschmitt Bf 109G-6

== Combat record ==
The squadron’s wartime performance included:

- Aerial victories: 345
- Aircraft losses: 30
- Pilots killed or missing: 12
- Pilots captured: 1

All aerial victories were achieved using the Messerschmitt Bf 109.

== Notable personnel ==
Several pilots of the squadron were awarded the Mannerheim Cross, Finland’s highest military decoration.

== See also ==
- No. 24 Squadron (Finland)
- No. 32 Squadron (Finland)
