= Mannerheim Cross =

Finnish World War II military decoration

Mannerheim Cross of Liberty
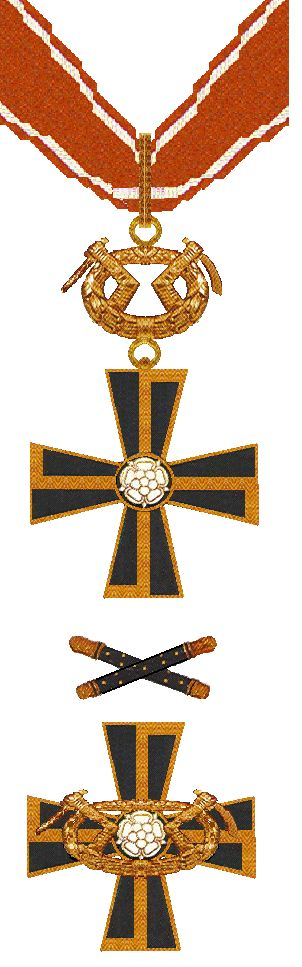
- Mannerheim Cross 1st Class (above) and 2nd Class (below). Crossed batons indicate a second award of a 2nd class cross.
- Type: Medal, two classes
- Awarded for: "Exceptional bravery, for the achievement of crucially important objectives by combat, or for especially successfully conducted operations."
- Presented by: Finland
- Eligibility: Military personnel
- Status: Still active de jure
- First award: July 22, 1941
- Final award: May 7, 1945

Highlights
- Total: 197
- Total recipients: 191

The Mannerheim Cross (Finnish: Mannerheim-risti, Swedish: Mannerheimkorset), officially Mannerheim Cross of the Cross of Liberty (Finnish: Vapaudenristin Mannerheim-risti, Swedish: Frihetskorsets Mannerheimkors) is the most distinguished Finnish military honour. A total of 191 people received the cross between 22 July 1941 and 7 May 1945, with six of the recipients receiving a cross twice. Available in two classes, the 1st class medal has only been awarded twice, with both recipients also having received the medal in the 2nd class. Although still active de jure, no crosses have been awarded since 1945. Tuomas Gerdt, the last living Knight of the Mannerheim Cross, died on 1 November 2020.

== Description ==
The honour, proposed by and named after Field Marshal Gustaf Mannerheim, was introduced after the Winter War on 16 December 1940. Associated with the Order of the Cross of Liberty, the decoration was awarded to soldiers for exceptional bravery, for the achievement of crucially important objectives by combat, or for especially successfully conducted operations. Unlike other awards associated with the Order of the Cross of Liberty, the awarding of either class of the Mannerheim Cross was not influenced by the military rank of the recipient.

The cross is awarded as either Mannerheim Cross of Liberty 1st Class or as Mannerheim Cross of Liberty 2nd Class. No special requirements differing from 2nd class were laid out for The Mannerheim Cross 1st Class. Within the order of precedence of Finnish awards, the Mannerheim Cross 1st Class ranks 5th and the Mannerheim Cross 2nd Class ranks 9th. A recipient of the cross is called "Knight of the Mannerheim Cross".

Like the crosses of the Order of the Cross of Liberty, the design of the Mannerheim Cross displays the Old Scandinavian Fylfot, albeit in different colors and with added decorative elements. The 1st class cross is worn as a necklet, while the 2nd class cross is worn on the chest.

The award was associated with a monetary prize in 1943. Originally planned to be a lifetime pension, the prize was eventually set at 50,000 Finnish marks, approximately equivalent to a lieutenant's annual salary.

== Knights of the Mannerheim Cross ==
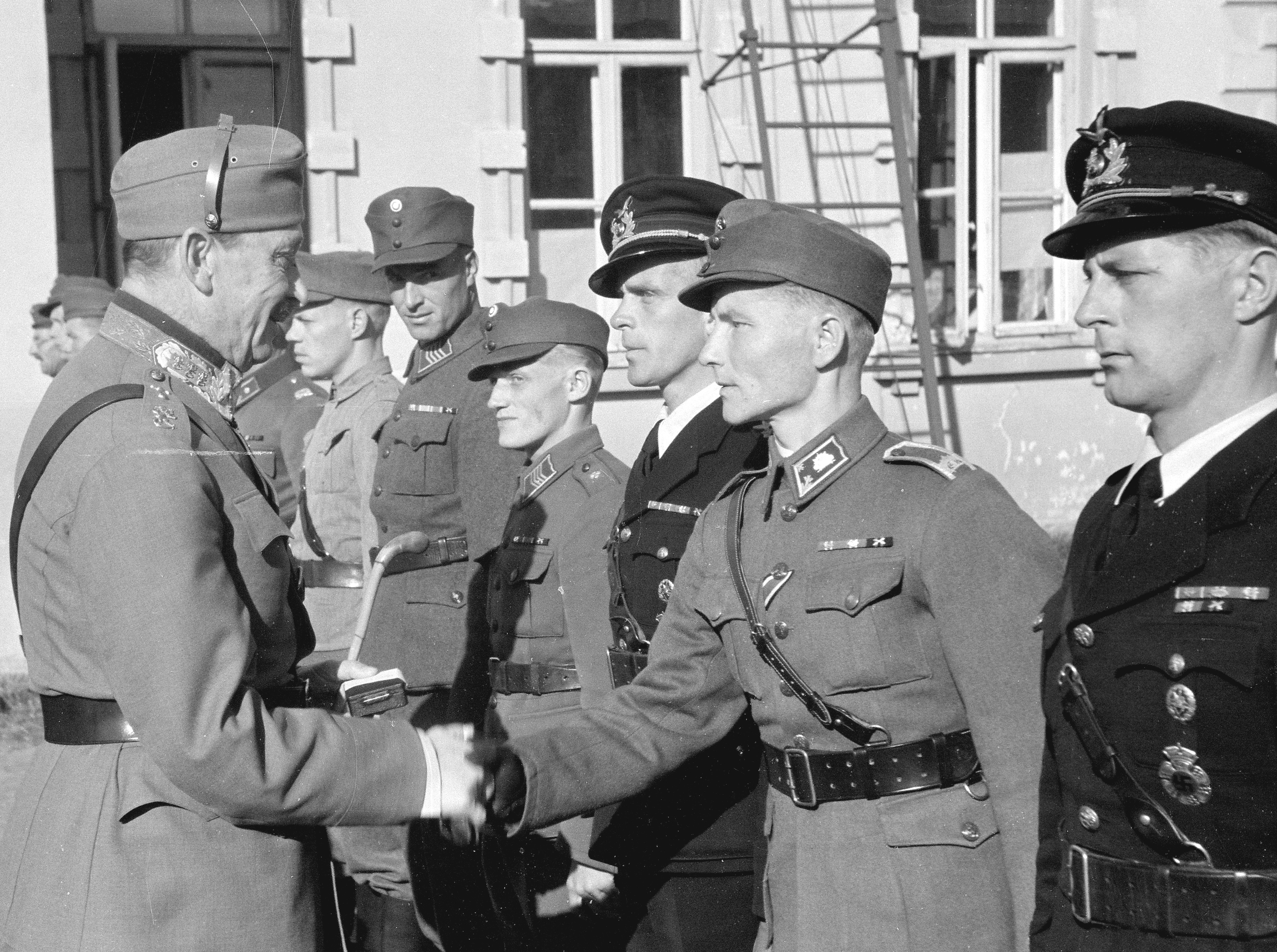
Marshal Mannerheim hands the Mannerheim Cross to cadet Yrjö Keinonen in September 1942.

The Mannerheim Cross 2nd Class has been awarded to 191 persons. The first cross was awarded to Colonel Ruben Lagus on 22 July 1941. The first private to be awarded the cross was Vilho Rättö, who was awarded his cross on 3 August 1941 for destroying four enemy tanks with a sightless anti-tank gun taken from the enemy, by aiming the gun through its bore. The last cross was awarded to Lieutenant Colonel Viljo Laakso on 7 May 1945.

A total of four persons have been awarded the Mannerheim Cross 2nd Class twice. Both General Major Aaro Pajari and Colonel Martti Aho received their second crosses on 16 October 1944. They were followed by Lentomestari Ilmari Juutilainen and Captain Hans Wind, who both received their second awards on 26 June 1944. These double-awardees were given a small clasp, consisting of two crossed marshal's batons, to be worn above the cross.

The first recipient of the Mannerheim Cross 1st Class was its namesake, Field Marshal C. G. E. Mannerheim, who accepted it together with a Mannerheim Cross 2nd Class from President of the Republic Risto Ryti on 7 October 1941 after all the previous awardees had requested him to accept the award. The only other recipient of the Mannerheim Cross 1st Class is General of Infantry Erik Heinrichs, who received it on 31 December 1944, following an earlier Mannerheim Cross 2nd Class on 5 February 1942.

The awardees of the Mannerheim Cross were predominately young, with 72 % of the awardees being 35 years of age or younger. Only 7 of the recipients were 51 or older, with the oldest recipient being Mannerheim himself. The crosses were awarded primarily to personnel from the army, with 159 recipients in the infantry. Five crosses were awarded to navy personnel, and a further 19 to air force personnel. Crosses were rarely awarded posthumously, with only six citations noting that the award was posthumous.

Starting from the presidency of Martti Ahtisaari, all surviving recipients of the Mannerheim Cross were invited annually on 6 December to Finland's Independence Day Reception. By tradition they were the first guests to enter and greet the president.

Tuomas Gerdt, the last living Knight of the Mannerheim Cross, died on 1 November 2020.

== Foundation of the Knights of the Mannerheim Cross ==
The first gathering of the Knights for the funeral of Mannerheim on 4 February 1951, where eight knights acted as pallbearers, resulted in a founding of the Foundation of the Knights of the Mannerheim Cross. The founding documents were signed on 5 March 1954, with the Ministry of Justice assenting to the founding and accepting the rules of the foundation on 8 March 1954.

The purpose of the foundation, as laid out in its rules, is to support activities intended to keep up the nationalistic spirit of sacrifice and the national defensive will, while also supporting the Knights of the Mannerheim Cross and their relatives.

== Notable Knights ==
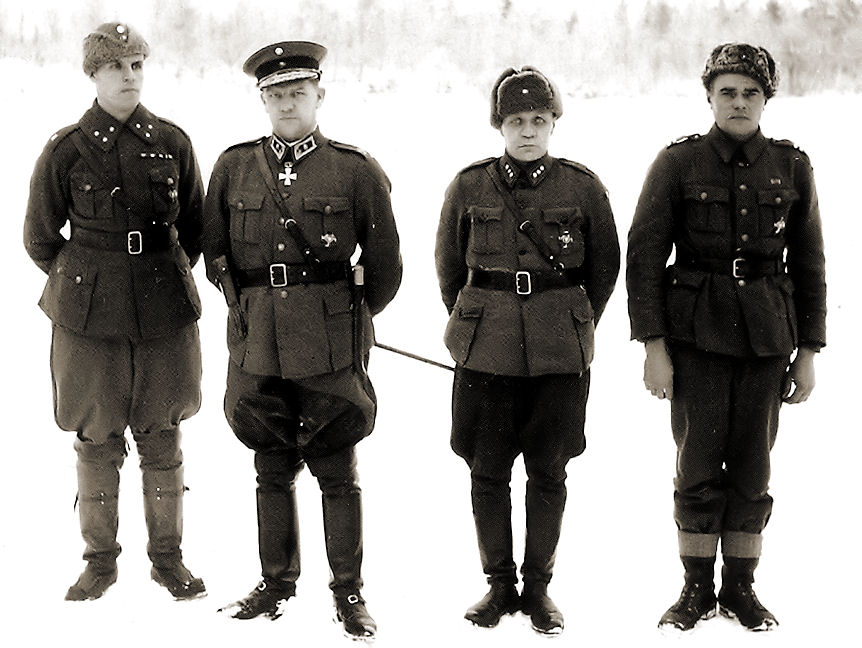
Knights of the Mannerheim Cross, from left to right: Captain Eero Kivelä, Major General Aaro Pajari, Captain Juho Pössi, and Corporal Vilho Rättö

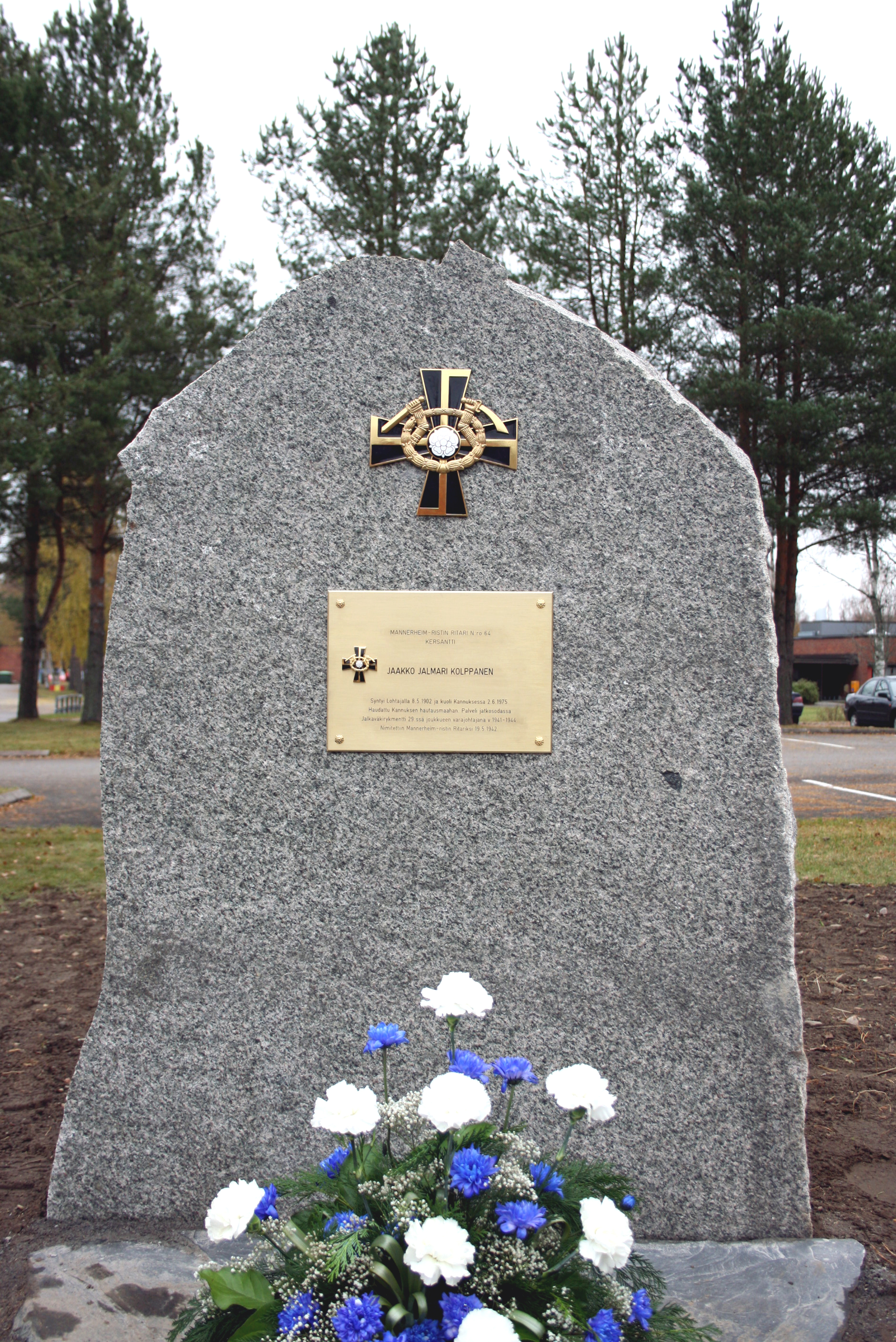
Memorial stone of Mannerheim cross holder Jaakko Kolppanen in Kannus, Finland.

- Carl Gustaf Mannerheim, Field Marshal, Commander-in-Chief – 1st and 2nd Class on 7 October 1941
- Erik Heinrichs, General of Infantry, army commander and Chief of General Staff – 2nd Class on 5 February 1942, 1st Class on 31 December 1944
- Martti Aho, Colonel, infantry regiment commander – 2nd Class on 1 March 1942, again on 16 October 1944
- Ilmari Juutilainen, Lentomestari, fighter pilot – 2nd Class on 26 April 1942, again on 28 June 1944
- Aaro Pajari, Major-General, infantry division commander – 2nd Class on 14 September 1941, again on 16 October 1944
- Hans Wind, Captain, fighter pilot – 2nd Class on 31 July 1943, again on 28 June 1944
- Aksel Airo, Lieutenant-General, Chief Quartermaster General chief of operations at the GHQ – 18 November 1944
- Adolf Ehrnrooth, Colonel, infantry regiment commander – 4 December 1944
- Ruben Lagus, Colonel, infantry brigade and division commander – 22 July 1941
- Vilho Nenonen, General of Artillery, Inspector of Artillery – 8 January 1945
- Lennart Oesch, Lieutenant-General, Commander of the Isthmus Forces – 26 June 1944
- Erkki Raappana, Colonel, division commander – 3 August 1941
- Hjalmar Siilasvuo, Lieutenant-General, army corps commander – 21 December 1944
- Paavo Talvela, Major-General, army corps commander – 3 August 1941
- Lauri Törni, Lieutenant, later Captain, infantry company commander – 9 July 1944
- Rudolf Walden, General of Infantry, Minister of Defense – 2 December 1944
- Vilho Rättö, Private, later Staff Sergeant
- Olavi Alakulppi, Captain
- Tuomas Gerdt, Captain, he was Knight of the Mannerheim Cross number 95 and last living of the 191 knights
