= Jeffrey Curmi =

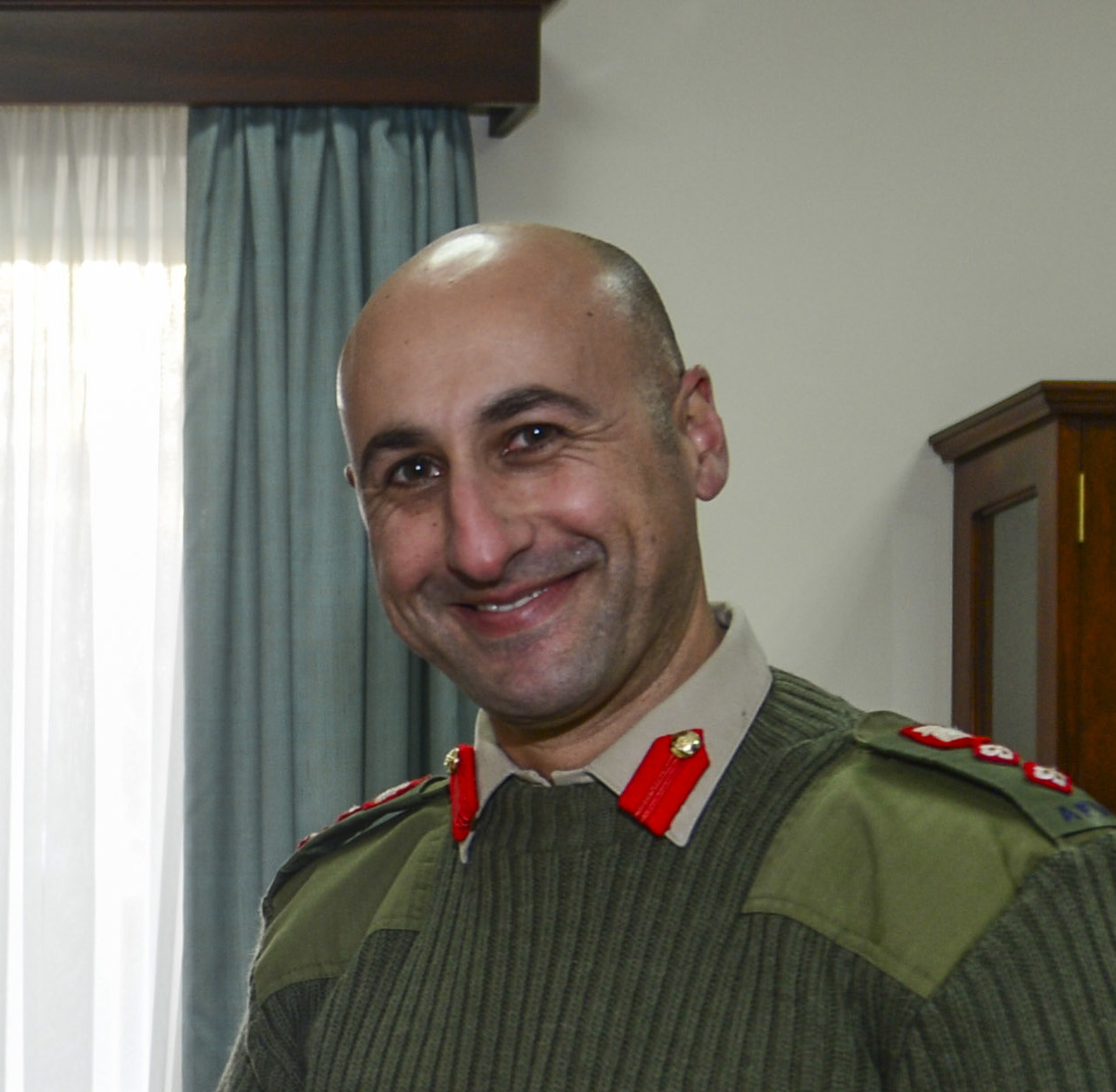
Official portrait.

Brigadier Jeffrey Curmi is a Maltese military officer and diplomat. He has been the Ambassador of Malta to the Netherlands since 2024. He was the Commander of the Armed Forces of Malta from 2013 to 2022, the longest serving AFM Commander to date.

== Early life and military career ==
Curmi enlisted in the Armed Forces of Malta in 1994 and graduated from the Royal Military Academy Sandhurst in 1996. At his graduation, he was presented with the ceremonial "The Cane of Honour" by Queen Elizabeth II. He became Commander of the Armed Forces of Malta in 2013. He retired on 13 June 2022, being succeeded by Brigadier Clinton J. O'Neill. After retiring, he briefly was chief executive officer of Transport Malta until 2023. On 6 March 2024, Curmi presented his letter of credence to King Willem-Alexander of the Netherlands at Noordeinde Palace in The Hague.

== Awards ==
- National Order of Merit
- Long Service and Efficiency Medal
- Common Security and Defence Policy Service Medal
- Order pro Merito Melitensi
- United States Navy Honour Man
