= Alfred Samut-Tagliaferro =

Brigadier Alfred Samut-Tagliaferro CBE (15 January 1920 – 19 May 1998) was a Maltese military officer and historian who served as the first Commander of the Armed Forces of Malta from 19 April 1973, until August 1975.

== Military career ==
He was born on 15 January 1920. His father Stephen had served as a Major in the 2nd Battalion, The King's Own Malta Regiment, during World War I. He originally served in the Royal Malta Artillery, commissioning as a 2nd Lieutenant on 21 February 1939. He then made Lieutenant on New Year's Day in 1941 and Captain on 2 March of that year before eventually rising through the ranks and attaining the rank of Lieutenant Colonel. He commanded the RMA from 10 May 1969 to 30 September 1970. Following Malta's independence, on 19 April 1973, he was appointed the first Commander of the Armed Forces of Malta (AFM). He was generally considered to be pro-British and anti the policies of Prime Minister Dom Mintoff. He left the post on 19 August 1975, being succeeded by Arthur Gera.

== Later life ==
Upon retirement, he transitioned into military research. In 1974, he had completed his foundational research text, History of the Royal Malta Artillery, Vol. 1 (1800–1939). In 1981, he published British Fortification and Defence of Malta 1800–1960. Additionally, he served as an advisor to the National War Museum in Valletta.

He died on 19 May 1998. He was survived by his wife Lilian (1916–2019) and his children Lilian, Mark and John. In November 2022, his son John transferred his Alfred's private historical library to the University of Malta Library.

== Awards ==
- Commander of the Order of the British Empire
