= Commander of the Armed Forces of Malta =

Highest-ranking military officer of in the Armed Forces of Malta

- Standard of the Commander
- Incumbent; Brigadier Clinton J. O'Neill since 28 June 2022
- Ministry for Home Affairs and National Security
- Reports to: Minister for Home Affairs and National Security
- Appointer: President of Malta
- Precursor: Commander of the Malta Land Force
- Formation: 19 April 1973
- Website: Official Website

The Commander of the Armed Forces is the highest-ranking military officer of in the Armed Forces of Malta, who is responsible for maintaining the operational command of the military. The current commander is Brigadier Clinton J. O'Neill.

== List of Commanders ==
No.	Portrait	Commander AMF	Took office	Left office	Time in office	Ref.
1	Alfred Samut-Tagliaferro	Brigadier; Alfred Samut-Tagliaferro	19 April 1973	August 1975	2 years, 3 months	
2	Arthur J.A. Gera MBE	Brigadier; Arthur J.A. Gera MBE	August 1975	28 February 1980	4 years, 6 months	
3	John Spiteri	Brigadier; John Spiteri (?–2011)	1 March 1980	September 1991	11 years, 6 months	
4	Maurice E. Calleja	Brigadier; Maurice E. Calleja	September 1991	December 1993	2 years, 3 months	
5	Claude M. Gaffiero	Brigadier; Claude M. Gaffiero	December 1993	December 1996	3 years	
6	Rupert C. Montanaro	Brigadier; Rupert C. Montanaro	December 1996	28 February 2004	7 years, 2 months	
7	Carmel Vassallo	Brigadier; Carmel Vassallo (born 1954)	1 March 2004	16 January 2010	5 years, 321 days	
8	Martin Xuereb	Brigadier; Martin Xuereb (born 1968)	16 January 2010	20 December 2013	3 years, 338 days	
9	Jeffrey Curmi	Brigadier; Jeffrey Curmi (born 1975)	20 December 2013	June 2022	8 years, 5 months	
10	Clinton J. O'Neill	Brigadier; Clinton J. O'Neill	28 June 2022	Incumbent	4 years, 98 days	
