= Martin Xuereb =

Maltese military leader

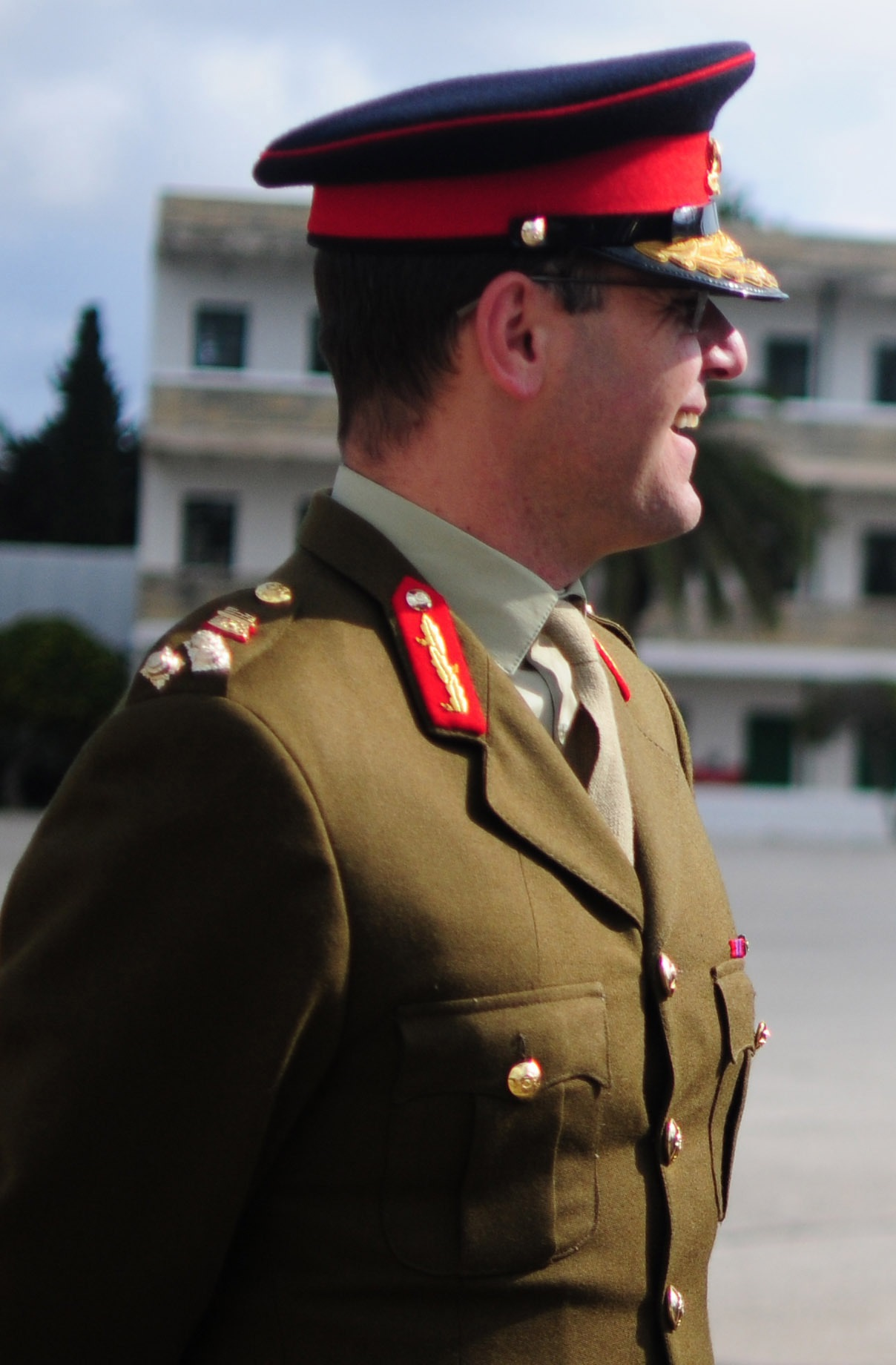
- Martin Xuereb in Luqa, Malta in 2011
- Born: 2 January 1968 (age 58)
- Military career
- Allegiance: Malta
- Branch: Armed Forces of Malta
- Service years: 1988–2013
- Rank: Brigadier

Brigadier Martin G. Xuereb (born 2 January 1968, Valletta, Malta) was the Commander of the Armed Forces of Malta, a position he assumed on 18 January 2010, succeeding Brigadier Carmel Vassallo.

== Biography ==
Xuereb was commissioned into the Regular Force of the Armed Forces of Malta into the rank of Second Lieutenant in October 1988.

=== Education ===
Xuereb completed an AUC course at the Infantry School of the Italian Army in Cesano, Italy. In 1990 as 2nd Lieutenant of the Armed Forces he completed the Commissioning Course at Royal Military Academy Sandhurst in the United Kingdom, where he was awarded the "Oman prize" for academic achievement.

He holds a Bachelor of Science (Hons) in Social Science with Politics from the Open University, and an MA in International Relations from King's College London.

=== Military career ===
Serving as a lieutenant in 1991/92, Xuereb commanded a platoon and in 1993 was appointed as Staff Officer III Personnel within Headquarters. Promoted to captain, in 1996, he was posted to Brussels as Malta's Defence Attaché and Representative to the Partnership Coordination Cell of the Partnership for Peace.

Xuereb returned to Malta in 1997 and was appointed as adjutant. Having been promoted to major, Xuereb later was attached to Foreign Affairs and posted to Brussels as the Attaché for Common Foreign and Security Policy. He also served as Malta's deputy military representative to the European Union from 2004 to 2006, upon Malta's accession to the EU.

A colonel as of 2 November 2007, Xuereb was subsequently appointed as deputy commander of the Armed Forces of Malta on 9 January 2008. Xuereb temporarily returned to the United Kingdom between January and December 2009, where he was a member of the Royal College of Defence Studies. On 18 January 2010 he was promoted to the rank of brigadier and the same day, he assumed command of the Armed Forces of Malta from Brigadier Vassallo in a parade at the AFM headquarters in Luqa barracks. Brigadier Xuereb resigned in March 2013 and was replaced by Major Jeffrey Curmi.

Xuereb has written on the financial challenges faced by the modern AFM during the 2008 financial crisis in the United States Naval Institute Proceedings magazine.

=== Migrant Offshore Aid Station ===
Since 2014, Xuereb has been Director of the Migrant Offshore Aid Station, a humanitarian, non-profit project aimed at assisting vessels in distress in the central Mediterranean.
