= Hal Far Fighter Flight RAF =

British fighter plane unit in World War II

Coordinates: 35°48′59″N 14°30′29″E

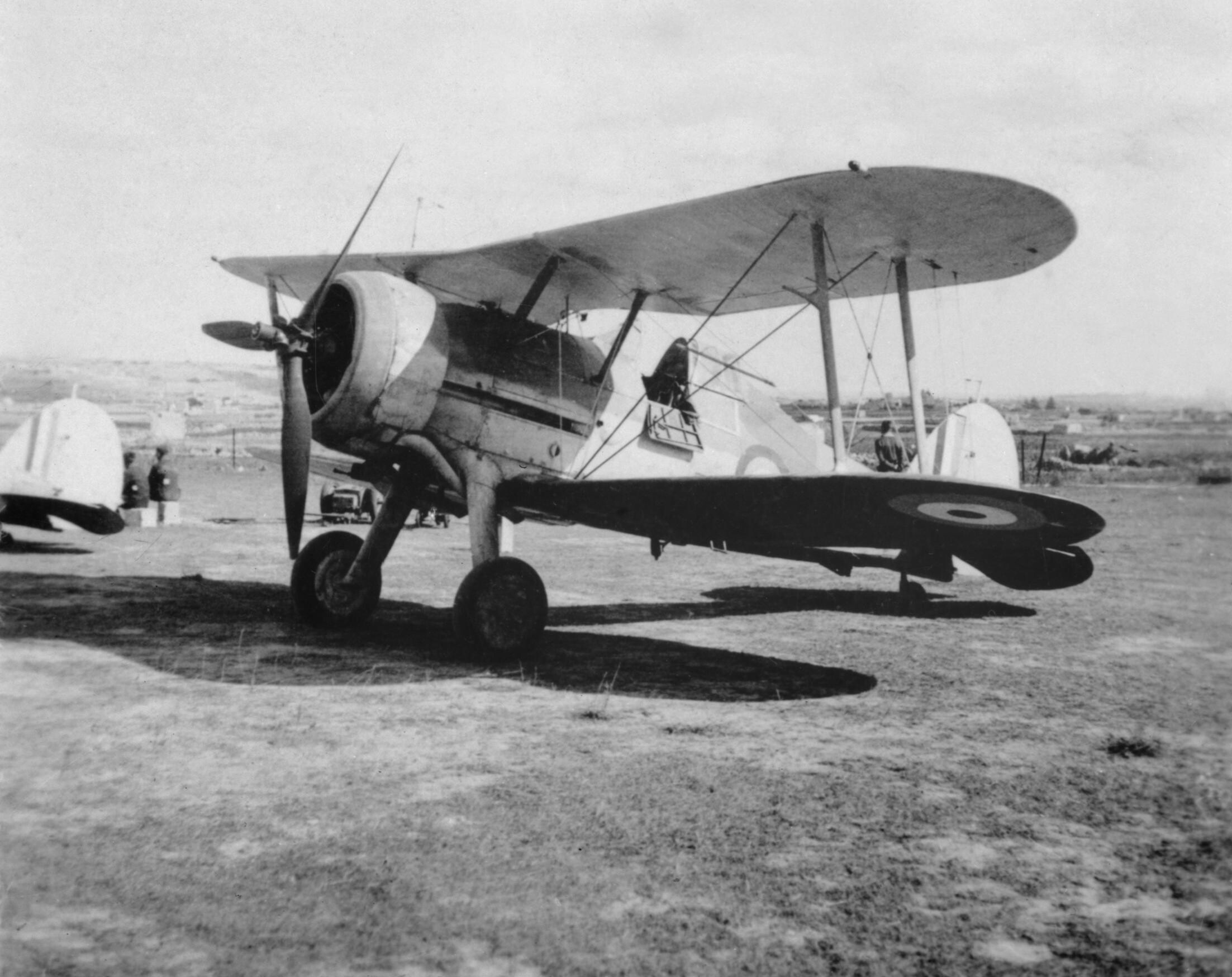
Faith (serial number N5520), a Gloster Sea Gladiator Mk I, on the ground at an airfield in Malta, in about September 1940. N5520 is the only surviving Gladiator from the Hal Far Fighter Flight, and was presented to the people of Malta in 1943.

The Hal Far Fighter Flight was a British fighter plane unit formed during the Siege of Malta in 1940, during World War II. For several weeks, the island of Malta was protected by a small force of Gloster Sea Gladiator biplane fighters (subsequently supported by Hawker Hurricanes), based at RAF Hal Far; which was also known as the Fleet Air Arm (FAA) station HMS Falcon. The flight is the source of the myth, that only three aircraft, named Faith, Hope, and Charity (N5519, N5520, and N5531) formed the fighter cover for the island. In fact, six aircraft were operational, though not always at the same time; others were used for spare parts. The names Faith, Hope, and Charity were applied to the aircraft many months later, by a Maltese newspaper.

== Background ==
Shipping crates containing eighteen Gloster Sea Gladiators Mark I (serial numbers N5518 – N5535) from 802 Naval Air Squadron, were left at Malta in early 1940 by HMS Glorious. Three of the airframes (N5532, N5533 and N5534) were re-embarked by Glorious on 12 April before the carrier left to take part in the Norwegian campaign, while three were sent to Egypt. In March 1940 it was decided to give Malta a degree of fighter protection, using some of the Sea Gladiators and available pilots. Six Sea Gladiators were allocated to the unit, with four assembled in April and the other two in May.

In April, it was decided that Malta had a need for fighter protection, and although the Gladiators were obsolete, they could hold their own in air combat against the Italian Regia Aeronautica bombers. N5519, N5520, N5522, and N5531 were assembled and test-flown. Two of these were to be used for normal operations, one was kept for spares, and the other was kept in reserve. (Another source states that the aircraft assembled in April were N5519, N5520, N5523, N5524, N5529, and N5531; N5518, N5521, N5522, N5525-28, and N5530 were to be the spares.) In May, N5524 and N5529, were assembled, and other crated aircraft were to be used as spares. On 11 June 1940, when the air battle for Malta began, the air defence consisted of four Gladiator aircraft, two of which maintained a continuous stand-by during daylight hours. N5520, better known as Faith, was fitted with an engine salvaged from a Bristol Blenheim bomber, which also used the Bristol Mercury engine and a Blenheim three-blade Hamilton propeller, rather than the standard two-blade propeller.

== Air raids begin ==
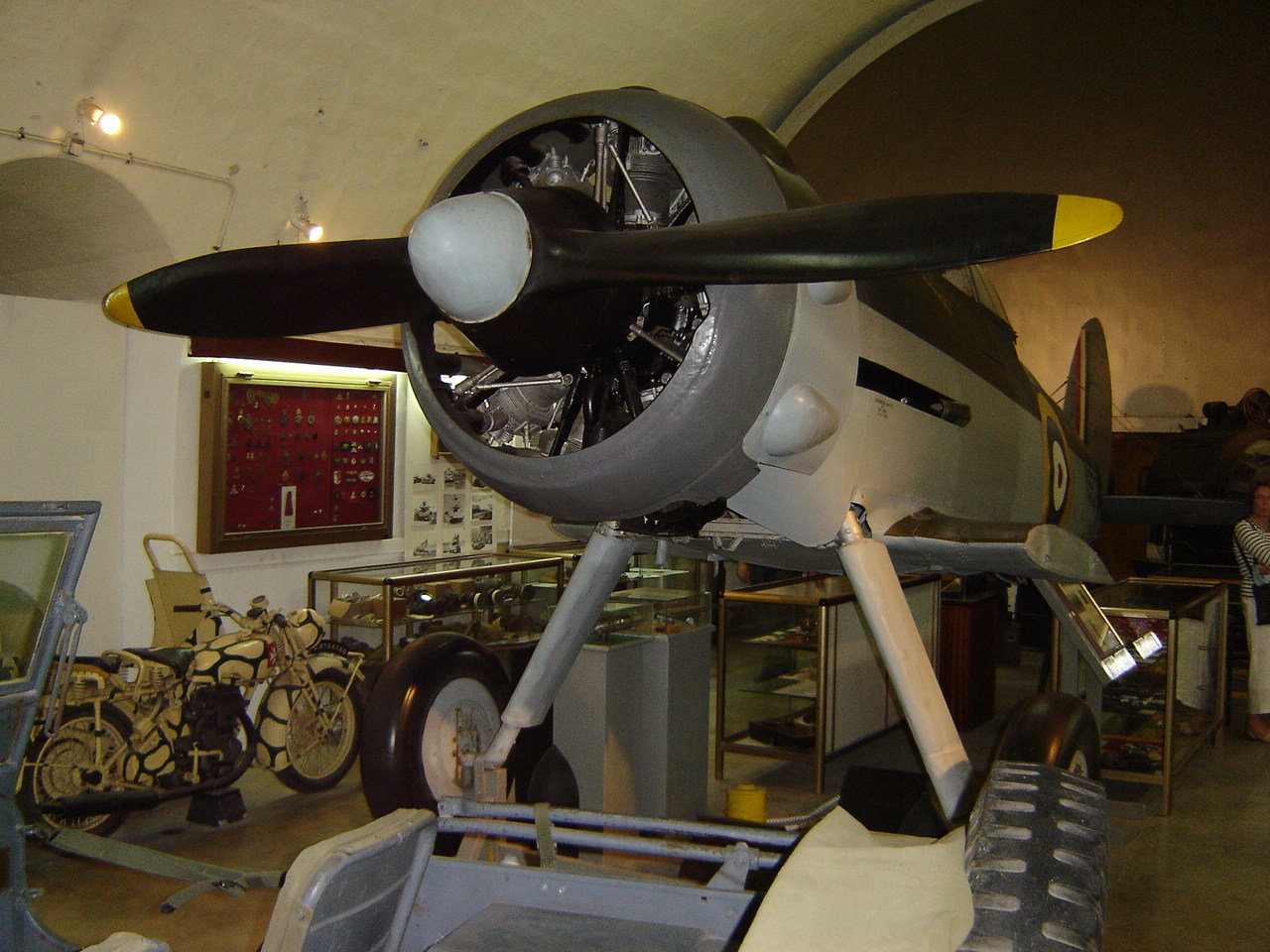
Fuselage of Faith in the National War Museum, Malta.

By June, two of the Sea Gladiators had crashed, and two more were assembled. On 10 June, Italy entered the war. That same day, ten Cant Z.1007 bombers of the Regia Aeronautica attacked Grand Harbour and Hal Far. In early raids, the Italian crews bombed from around 5,500 metres (18,000 feet), and later reduced the bombing altitude to 3,000 metres (9,800 feet), to improve their accuracy. A reporter, Mabel Strickland, claimed that "the Italians decided they didn't like [the Gladiators and AA guns], so they dropped their bombs [30 kilometres (19 miles)] off Malta and went back".

Five Hawker Hurricanes were ferried to Malta via France and Tunis by the end of June, joining the Sea Gladiators of the flight. The Fall of France on 25 June 1940 stopped the delivery of replacement aircraft to Malta via that route, so on 2 August 1940, twelve Hurricanes were flown from the aircraft carrier Argus to Malta. The newly arrived Hurricanes (which initially formed No. 418 Flight) became No. 261 Squadron RAF on 16 August 1940, with the new squadron absorbing the Hal Far Fighter Flight. Charity was shot down on 29 July 1940, and its pilot, Flying Officer (F/O) P. W. Hartley, was badly burned. Hope was destroyed in an air raid on 4 February 1941, and Faith survived the war. The fate of at least five more Sea Gladiators that saw action over Malta is not as well documented. Sea Gladiators N5513 and N5535 were taken over by No. 33 Squadron RAF, in May 1941 (suggesting that the serial number usually allocated to Hope is incorrect). The fuselage of N5520, popularly known as Faith, is on display at the National War Museum, Fort St Elmo, Valletta.
