= Oiva Tuominen =

Finnish fighter ace

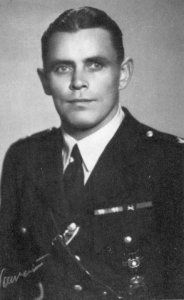
- Born: 5 March 1908; Iitti
- Died: 28 January 1976 (aged 67); Helsinki
- Military career
- Allegiance: Finland
- Branch: Finnish Air Force
- Service years: 1930-1945
- Rank: Chief Warrant Officer
- Nickname: Oippa
- Units: LeLv 26, LeLv 30, LeLv 34
- Conflicts: World War II; Winter War; Continuation War
- Other work: Professional pilot Taxi driver

Oiva Emil Kalervo "Oippa" Tuominen (5 March 1908, Iitti – 28 January 1976, Helsinki) was a Finnish fighter ace and a Mannerheim Cross knight of the second class. He flew over 400 missions and shot down 44 Soviet aircraft. He was the most successful Finnish biplane fighter ace (flying Gloster Gladiators), and also the most successful Finnish Fiat G.50 Freccia pilot.

== Biography ==
Oiva Emil Kalervo Tuominen was born in Iitti, in Southern Finland, on 5 March 1908.

Tuominen was accepted into the Finnish Air Force as a mechanic in 1926. In 1933, he applied for pilot training. He was promoted to sergeant and transferred to LeLv 26, a fighter squadron equipped with the Bristol Bulldog.

In the Winter War, Senior Sgt. Tuominen initially served with LeLv 24 flying the Fokker D.XXI. He opened his score on 25 December 1939 with a shared SB-2, and another 19 January. He was transferred back to LeLv 26 in February to fly the new Gloster Gladiator. His first flight with the new fighter on 2 of February 1940 saw combat against at least nine I-16s. Tuominen shot down two of the Soviet fighters. On 13 February 1940 he shot down three SB-2 of 39 SBAP and damaged a fourth. His Winter War score totalled eight, and four unconfirmed.

As war erupted again in June 1941 Sgt. Tuominen had converted to the Italian Fiat G.50 monoplane. Tuominen was promoted to Sergeant-Major with his score at 18, and became the first FAF holder of the Mannerheim Cross on 18 August 1941.

By April 1943 Flight Master Sergeant Tuominen had 31 victories, being transferred to HLeLv 34 equipped with the Bf 109G-2.

Tuominen resigned from the Air Force on January 6, 1945. After the war, he worked, among other things, as a commercial pilot for the Imatran Voima company and as a taxi driver.

After the war, Tuominen resigned from military service and became a taxi operator. He remained an active sports pilot well into old age. He died on 28 January 1976.

== Victories ==
Aircraft	Victories
Fiat G.50 Freccia	23
Fokker D.XXI	1.5
Gloster Gladiator Mk.II	6.5
Messerschmitt Bf 109G	13
Total	44
