= Arthur J.A. Gera =

Maltese military commander

Brigadier Arthur James A. Gera MBE was a Maltese military officer and historian who served as the Commander of the Armed Forces of Malta from August 1975 to 28 February 1980.

== Military career ==
He was born in Sliema in 1930. He graduated from the Liceo Vassalli Junior Lyceum before going to the Royal Military Academy, Sandhurst in 1947. He graduated in 1951 and commissioned into the Royal Malta Artillery, part of the Malta Land Force. He was the first of the new post-World War II intake of officers of the Royal Malta Artillery officers. He also studied at the University of Malta. Upon commissioning, he served in the 2nd Heavy Anti-Aircraft Regiment of the RMA up to 1956, serving as Captain until 1959. He later served as aide-de-camp to Maurice Dorman, the Governor of Malta (later Governor-General) up to 1965, after which he returned to the RMA as battery commander of the 3rd Battery when this formed part of the British Army of the Rhine in West Germany. In 1969, he was promoted to brigadier major and in 1970 was made a general staff officer at HQ Malta Land Force.

He was promoted to Brigadier and Commander of the Armed Forces of Malta in August 1975, succeeding Alfred Samut-Tagliaferro on an acting basis before being made the permanent successor a year later.

== Resignation ==
In March 1980, the then Prime Minister, Dom Mintoff unilaterally and without consulting Gera, ordered the creation of a "Task Force" from the 1st Regiment, the Maritime Squadron and the Helicopter Flight and placing them under command of the police commissioner John Cachia. Gera resigned as a result with immediate effect.

== Later life ==
After retiring, he joined the family's leading pharmaceutical business, Alfred Gera & Sons. and worked there for over 40 years until a couple of months before his death. He died on July 26, 2022, after an illness at the age of 92. He was survived by his wife Marie Therese Amato-Gauci (married in 1959) with whom he had a son, Michael, and two daughters, Joanna and Madeleine.

== Awards ==
- Member of the Order of the British Empire (1970)
