= Clinton J. O'Neill =

Brigadier Clinton J. O'Neill is a Maltese military officer who has served as the Commander of the Armed Forces of Malta since 28 June 2022.

== Early life and military career ==
O'Neill enlisted in the Armed Forces of Malta in 1992 and served within the Air Traffic Services and Air Squadron until he commissioned as a Second Lieutenant in 1994. Between 1995 and 1997, O'Neill attended Italian Infantry School and United States Army Infantry School. In October 2013, he assumed office as Commanding Officer Air Wing of the Armed Forces of Malta. In 2022, he was appointed Deputy Commander of the Armed Forces, on addition to being Colonel Operations, Plans and Intelligence Branch at Headquarters, AFM, a role he served in since April 2016. On 13 June 2022, he was promoted to the rank of Brigadier and officially appointed as the Commander of the Armed Forces of Malta, succeeding Jeffrey Curmi. He took office on 28 June. In 2025, he was placed under temporary suspension following a security breach at the Safi Barracks, where a break-in and subsequent drug theft occurre. A formal inquiry was launched to investigate the incident, which ended up clearing O'Neill of direct responsibility for the breach, after which his suspension was lifted and he was fully reinstated to active duty.

== Awards ==
- Midalja għall-Qadi tar-Repubblika (2013)
- Long and Efficient Service Medal (2010)
