= National War Museum (Malta) =

- Mużew Nazzjonali tal-Gwerra
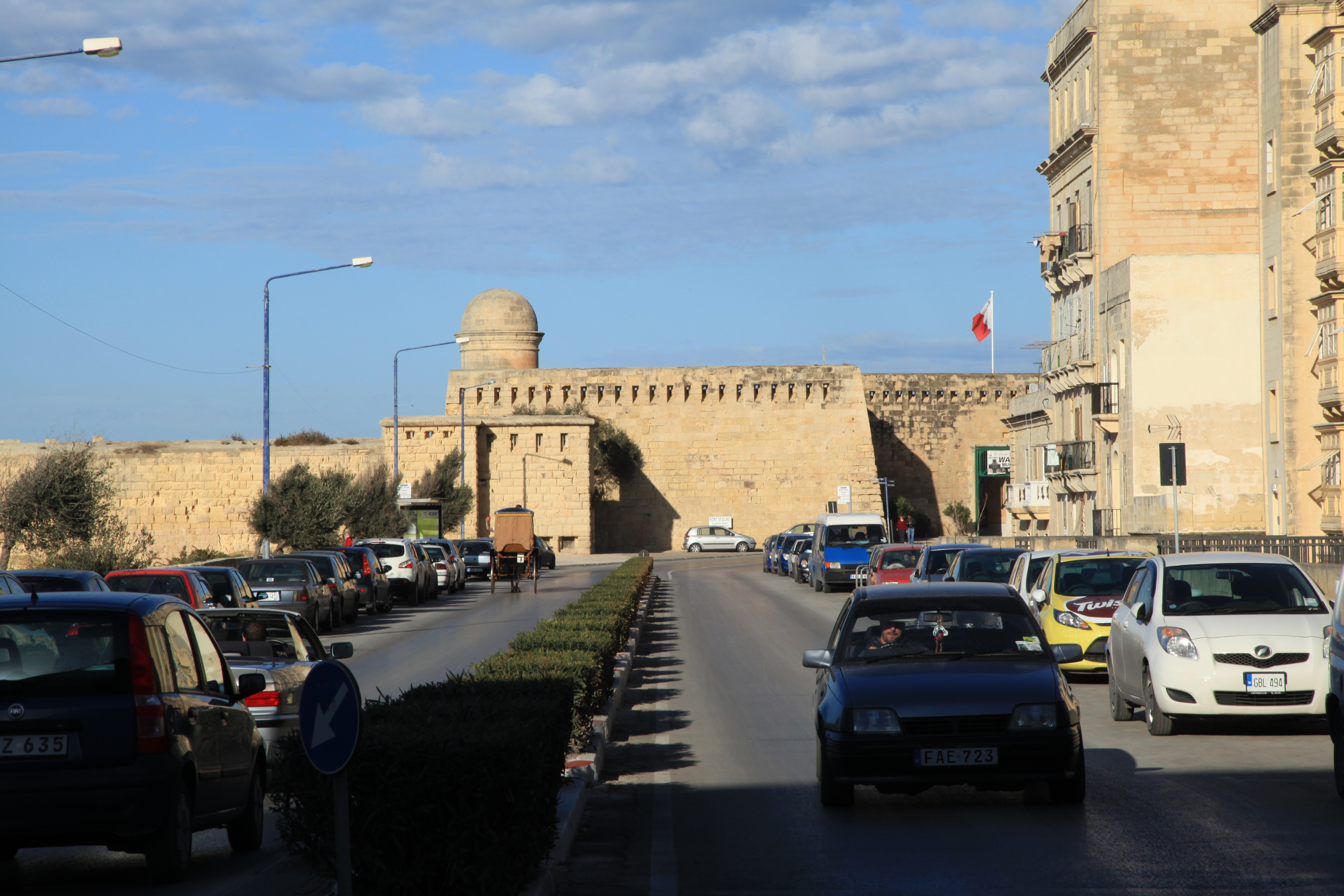
- Part of Fort Saint Elmo, with the former entrance to the museum on the right
- Established: 1975
- Location: Fort Saint Elmo, Valletta, Malta
- Coordinates: 35°54′7″N 14°31′7″E
- Type: Military museum
- Website: Heritage Malta

The National War Museum is a museum in Fort Saint Elmo in the city of Valletta, Malta. It is one of the most popular museums in Malta. From 1975 to 2014, its collection mainly focused on World War I and World War II. It was refurbished in 2015, and its collections now include exhibits ranging from the Bronze Age to 2004.

== Location ==
The museum was located in the Old Drill Hall of Lower Saint Elmo. The building was originally a gunpowder magazine, that was converted into an armoury in around 1853. Anti-aircraft gun crews were trained there during World War II.

Lower Saint Elmo is the lower part of Fort Saint Elmo, built in the 18th and 19th centuries. It was built after the original star fort (Upper Saint Elmo) and the outer fortifications (Carafa Enceinte), and is the most dilapidated part of the fort.

== Collections ==
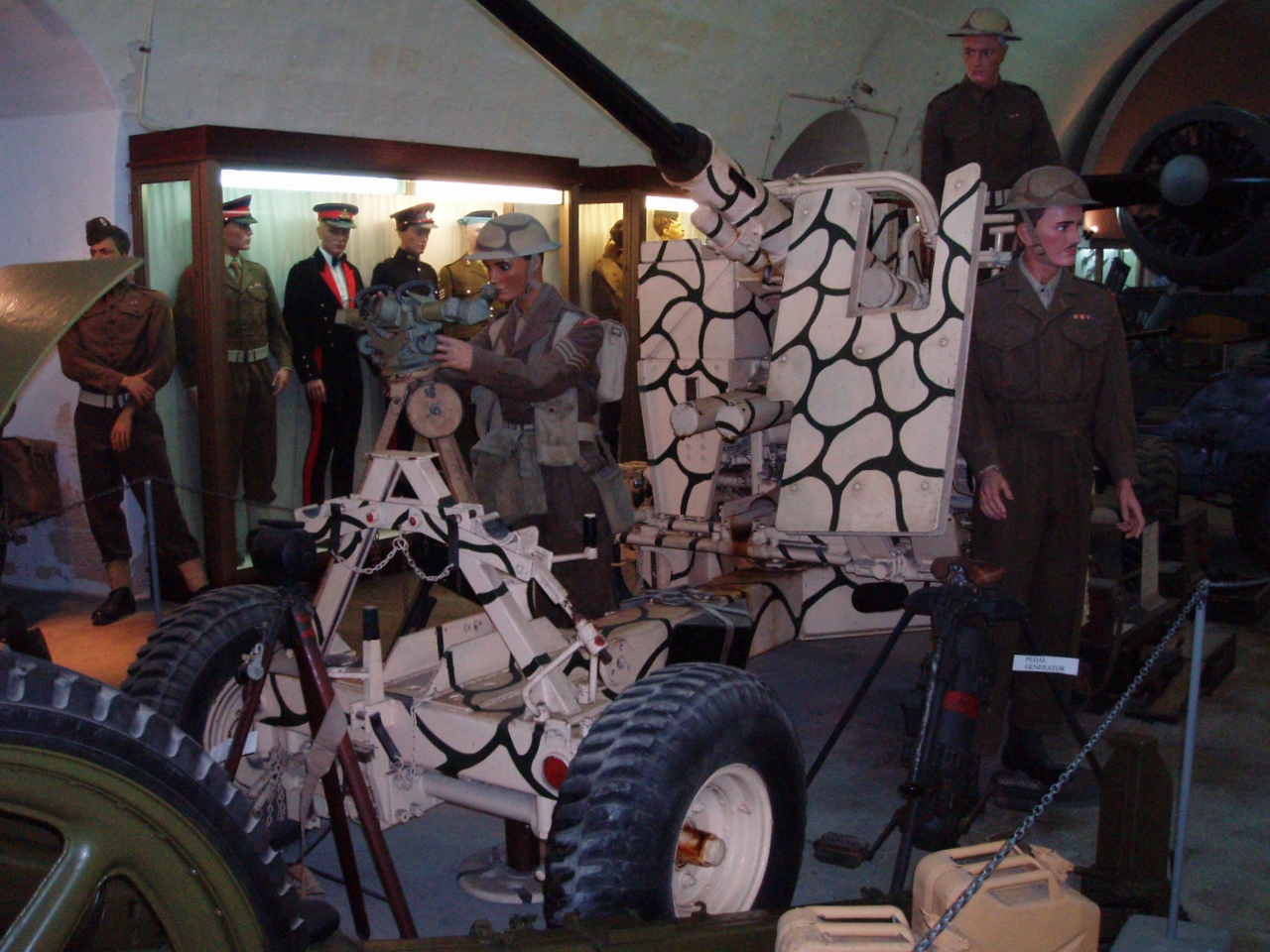
World War II Bofors 40 mm anti-aircraft gun at the National War Museum

Since its renovation in 2015, the museum contains artifacts relating to the military history of Malta ranging from the Bronze Age to Malta's entry into the European Union in 2004.

The museum's most important collection relates to World War II . There are various photographic panels showing life in Malta during the war, especially the hardships of civilian life and damage from aerial bombardment. One of the highlights includes the fuselage of a Gloster Sea Gladiator N5520, the only survivor from the Hal Far Fighter Flight. The museum also contains a Willys Jeep 'Husky' used by Dwight D. Eisenhower before the invasion of Sicily and also by Roosevelt while visiting Malta. The George Cross that was awarded to Malta by King George VI in April 1942 is also on display at the museum. The collection also contains wreckage from crashed aircraft, captured German machine guns, a torpedo, trench mortars and other weapons.

== Renovation ==
The museum closed to the public on 21 September 2014 during the restoration of Fort St Elmo. It was renovated and reopened in May 2015, having a larger collection than the original museum.

== See also ==
- List of museums in Malta
