= Lockheed Martin F-35 Lightning II operators =

Nations flying the F-35 fighter

Operates F-35A, F-35B and F-35C variants (United States) Operates F-35A and F-35B variants (Italy, Japan) Operates F-35A variant only (Australia, Belgium, Canada, Denmark, Finland, Germany, Netherlands, Norway, Poland, South Korea) Operates F-35B variant only (United Kingdom) Operates F-35I variant only (Israel) Awaiting delivery (F-35A: Czech Republic, Greece, Romania, Switzerland; F-35A & F-35B: Singapore)

The Lockheed Martin F-35 Lightning II is a family of stealth multirole fighters that first entered service with the United States in 2015. The aircraft has been ordered by program partner nations, including the United Kingdom, Italy, Norway, and Australia, and also through the Department of Defense's Foreign Military Sales program, including Japan, South Korea, and Israel. The units that operate or plan on operating the aircraft are listed below.

== Operators ==
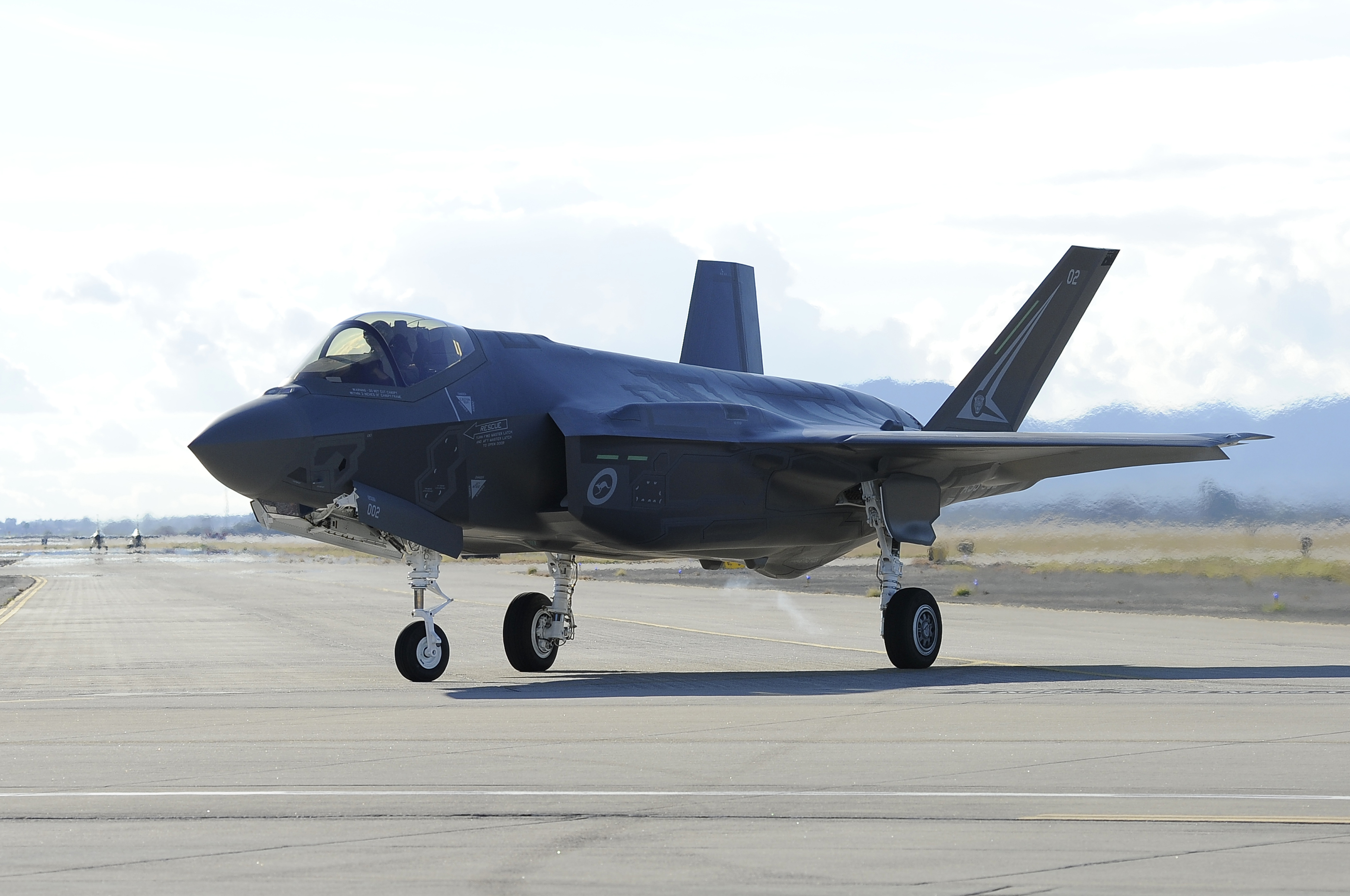
One of the RAAF's first two F-35As in December 2014

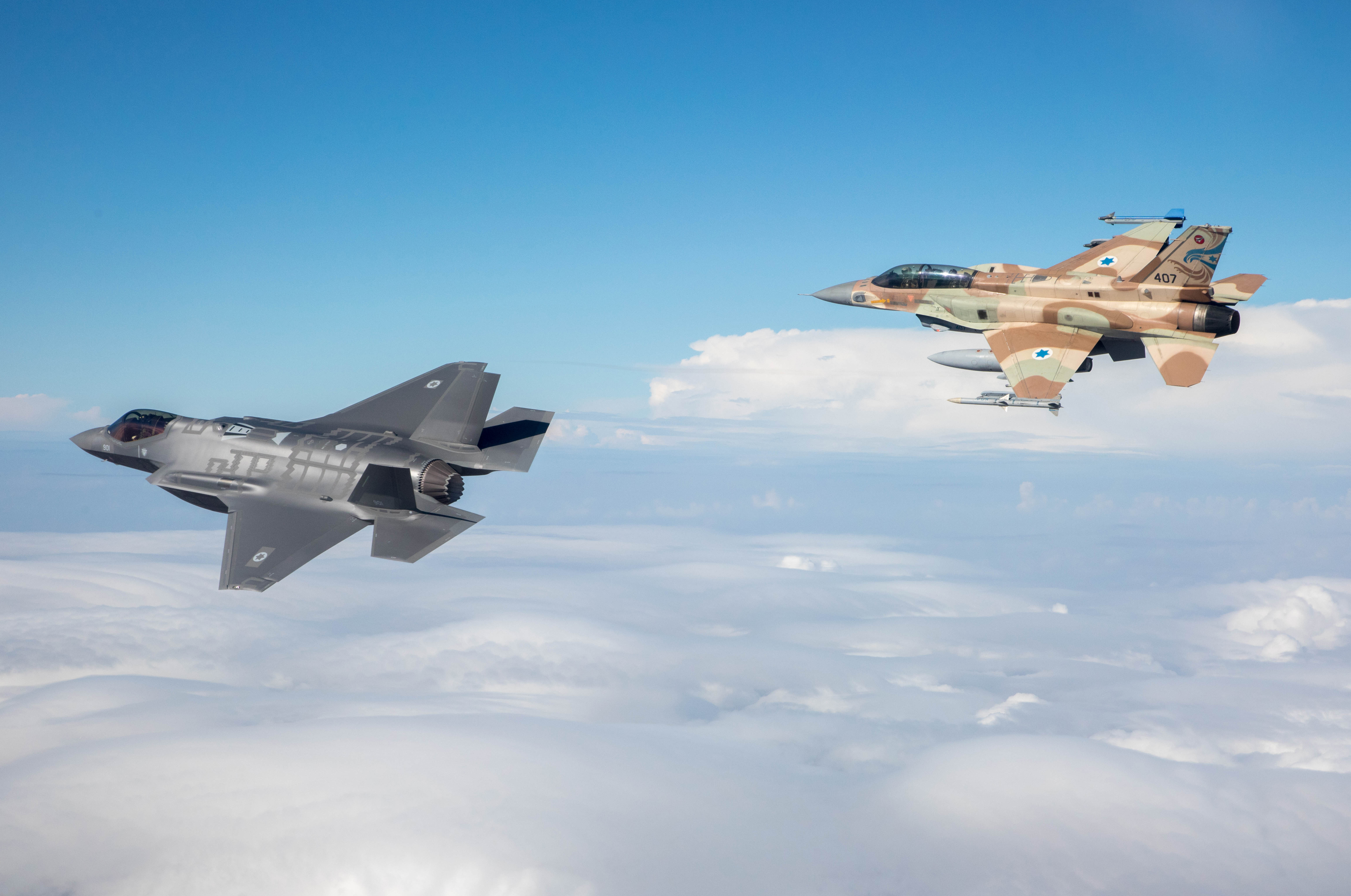
The F-35I Adir (accompanied by a 253 Squadron F-16I Sufa) on its debut flight in Israel, December 2016

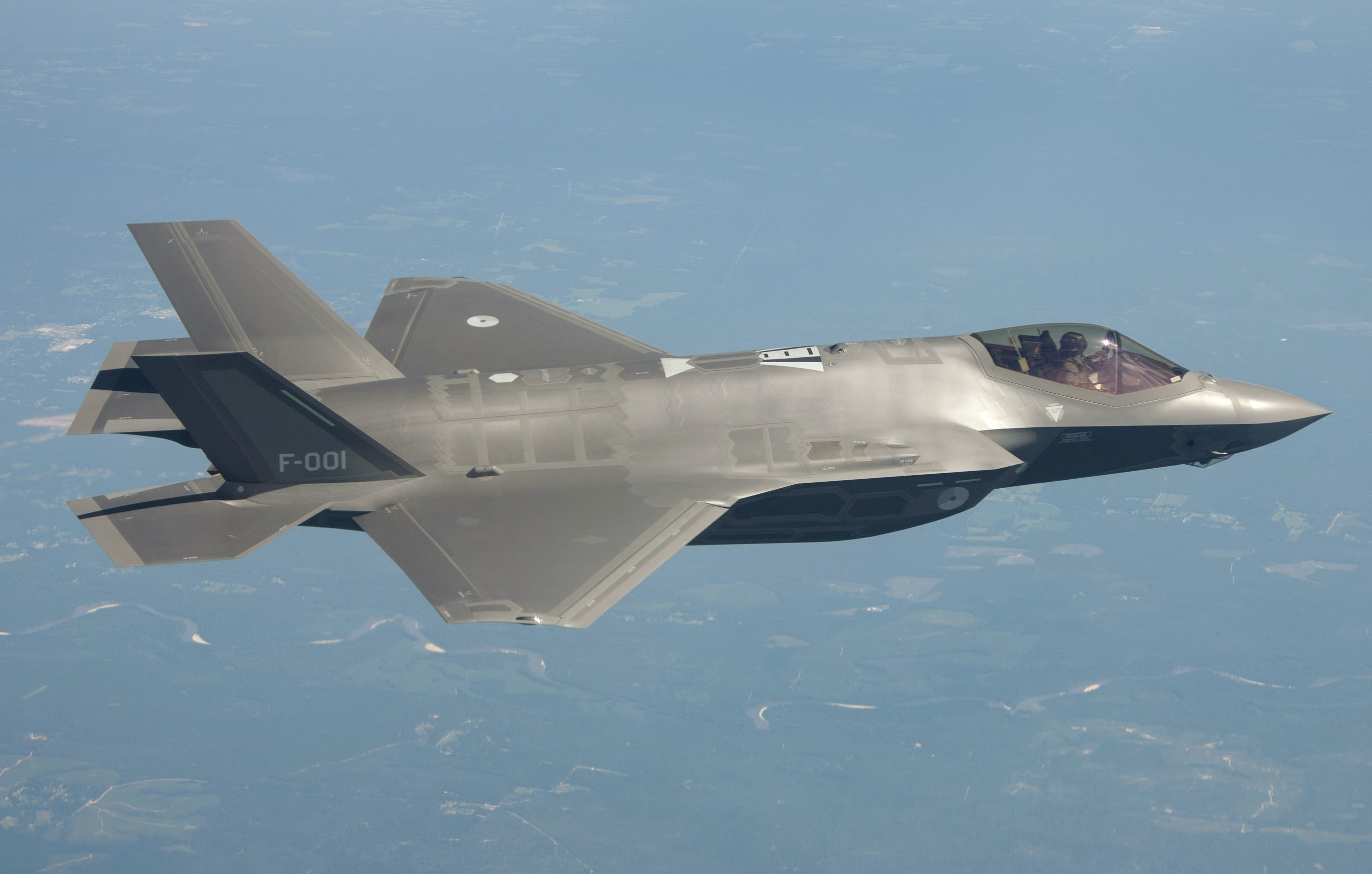
Dutch F-35A in July 2013

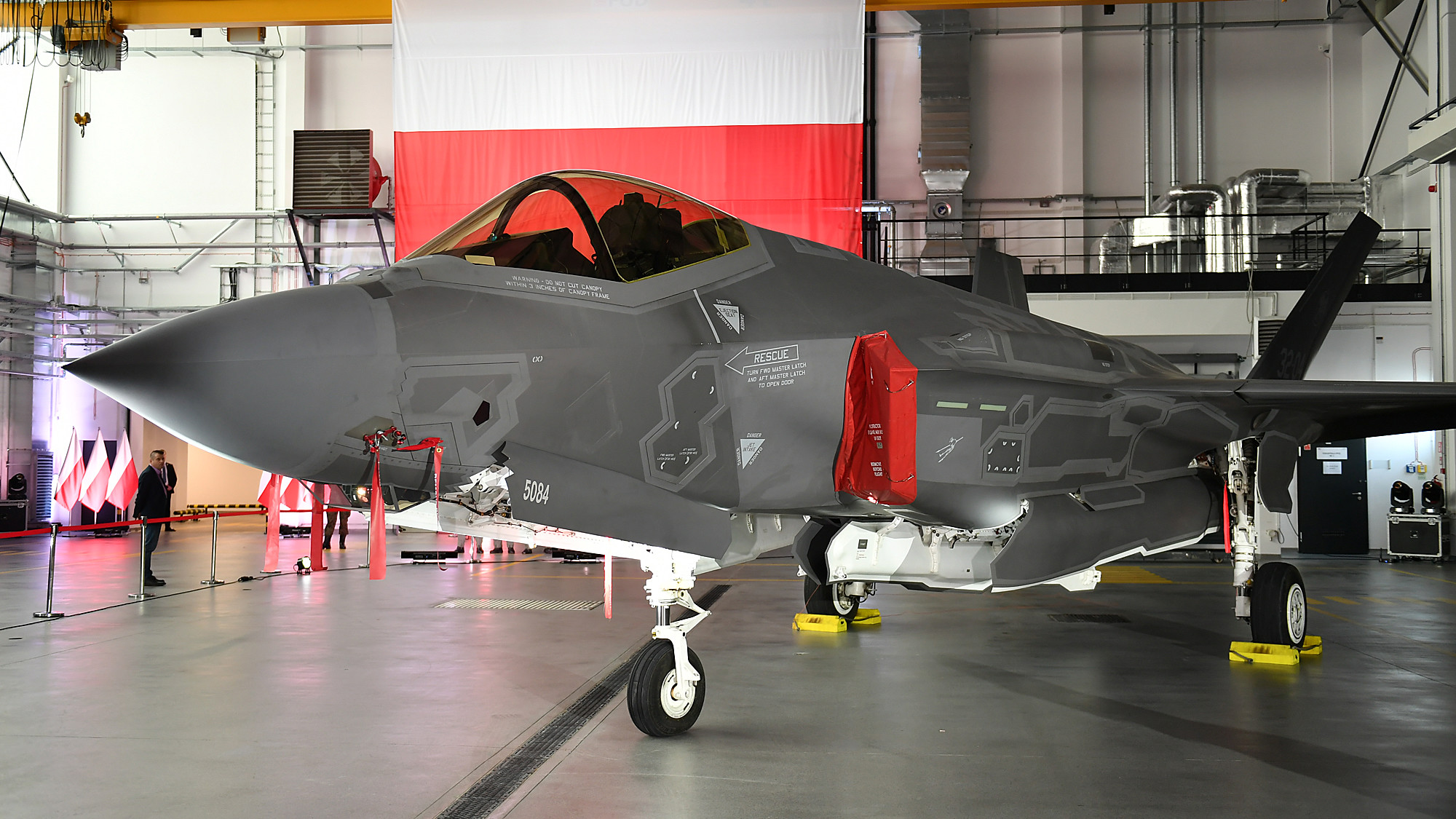
F-35 in 41st Training Air Base in Dęblin, Poland during the 2020 acquisition deal signing ceremony

=== F-35A ===
Australia

- Royal Australian Air Force – 72 operational.
  - RAAF Base Williamtown, New South Wales
    - No. 2 OCU
    - No. 3 Squadron
    - No. 77 Squadron
  - RAAF Base Tindal, Northern Territory
    - No. 75 Squadron

Belgium

- Belgian Air Force – 4 operational, 45 planned.
  - Florennes Air Base
    - 2nd Tactical Wing
  - Kleine Brogel Air Base
    - 10th Tactical Wing

Canada

- Royal Canadian Air Force – 88 ordered in January 2023. The first eight aircraft are expected to be flown from Luke Air Force Base, starting in 2026 for the training of Canadian pilots. First squadron operational in 2029 and full fleet operational by 2032 to 2034.

Czech Republic

- Czech Air Force – The U.S. State Department approved a possible sale to the Czech Republic of F-35 aircraft, munitions and related equipment worth up to $5.62 billion, according to a 29 June 2023 announcement. On 29 January 2024, the Czech government signed a memorandum of understanding with the United States for the purchase of 24 F-35A fighters.

Denmark

- Royal Danish Air Force – 17 delivered out of 43 planned. The first four aircraft are expected to be flown from Luke Air Force Base, starting in 2021 for the training of Danish pilots. The first four aircraft arrived at Skrydstrup Air Base in September 2023 with 13 more having been delivered to Skrydstrup in January 2025. Full operational capability for the first 27 is expected in 2027; the second batch of 16 has secured no production slot yet.
  - Skrydstrup Air Base, Vojens
    - Eskadrille 727

Finland

- Finnish Air Force – 64 ordered.
  - Lapland Air Wing, Rovaniemi Air Base
    - Hävittäjälentolaivue 11
  - Karelia Air Wing, Rissala Air Base
    - Hävittäjälentolaivue 31

Germany

- German Air Force – 35 ordered.
  - Taktisches Luftwaffengeschwader 33, Büchel Air Base

Greece

- Hellenic Air Force – 20 ordered with an option to buy 20 more.

Italy

- Italian Air Force – 42 operational, out of 75 ordered.
  - Amendola Air Base, Apulia
    - 32º Stormo
  - Ghedi Air Base, Lombardy
    - 6º Stormo

Japan

- Japan Air Self-Defense Force – 46 operational; with a total order of 105 F-35A variants. 41 of these F-35As are being built by Mitsubishi.
  - Misawa Air Base, Aomori
    - 301st Hikōtai
    - 302nd Hikōtai

Netherlands

- Royal Netherlands Air and Space Force – 49 operational, from 58 ordered.
  - Leeuwarden Air Base
    - No. 322 Squadron
  - Volkel Air Base
    - No. 312 Squadron
    - No. 313 Squadron

Norway

- Royal Norwegian Air Force – 52 operational.
  - Ørland Main Air Station, Trøndelag
    - 331 Skvadron
    - 332 Skvadron
    - Testing, trening og taktikk Skvadron

Poland

- Polish Air Force – 10 operational, from 32 ordered.
  - 32nd Tactical Air Base, Łask

Romania

- Romanian Air Force – The first order for 32 F-35 fighters worth $6.5 billion was concluded on 21 November 2024. Plans are to buy a further 16 F-35s for a total of 48 which will replace the current Romanian F-16s between 2034 and 2040. First aircraft are expected to be delivered for training at the Ebbing ANGB in 2031, and the first eight F-35s will arrive in Romania in 2032.

Singapore

- Republic of Singapore Air Force – 8 ordered in 2024, to be delivered from 2030.

South Korea

- Republic of Korea Air Force – 39 operational out of 60 ordered.
  - 17th Fighter Wing - Cheongju AFB
    - 151st Fighter Squadron
    - 152nd Fighter Squadron

Switzerland

- Swiss Air Force – 36 on order to replace F-5E/F Tiger II and F/A-18C/D Hornet. Deliveries will begin in 2027 and conclude in 2030.

United Kingdom

- Royal Air Force – 12 on order (Note: In June 2025, the UK government announced that, as part of the second tranche of 27 aircraft it planned to procure, it would purchase 15 new F-35Bs, swapping the additional 12 airframes for an identical number of F-35As. Intended to operate as part of 207 Squadron, the Lightning Operational Conversion Unit, the F-35A would primarily be utilised as a training platform, thanks to its increased endurance over the F-35B. Additionally, the F-35A would allow the UK to restore its airborne nuclear strike capability as part of NATO's dual-capable aircraft programme.)

United States

- United States Air Force – 443 operational, 1,763 planned.
  - Air Combat Command
    - 23rd Wing – Moody AFB, Georgia (Planned for 2029)
    - 33d Fighter Wing – Eglin AFB, Florida
      - 57th Fighter Squadron – Ebbing ANGB, Arkansas
      - 58th Fighter Squadron
      - 60th Fighter Squadron
    - 53d Wing – Eglin AFB, Florida
      - 31st Test and Evaluation Squadron – Edwards AFB, California (53d Test and Evaluation Group)
      - 422d Test and Evaluation Squadron – Nellis AFB, Nevada (53d Test and Evaluation Group)
    - 57th Wing – Nellis AFB, Nevada
      - 6th Weapons Squadron
      - 65th Aggressor Squadron
    - 325th Fighter Wing – Tyndall AFB, Florida
      - 95th Fighter Squadron
      - Additional unspecified squadron
      - Additional unspecified squadron
    - 388th Fighter Wing – Hill AFB, Utah
      - 4th Fighter Squadron
      - 34th Fighter Squadron
      - 421st Fighter Squadron
    - 495th Fighter Group – Shaw AFB, South Carolina
      - 315th Fighter Squadron (Active Associate) – Burlington ANGB, Vermont
      - 377th Fighter Squadron (Active Associate) – Dannelly Field ANGB, Alabama
      - 378th Fighter Squadron (Active Associate) – Truax Field ANGB, Wisconsin
  - Air Education and Training Command
    - 56th Fighter Wing – Luke AFB, Arizona
      - 61st Fighter Squadron
      - 62d Fighter Squadron
      - 63d Fighter Squadron
      - 308th Fighter Squadron
      - 310th Fighter Squadron
      - 312th Fighter Squadron
  - Air Force Reserve Command
    - 301st Fighter Wing
      - 457th Fighter Squadron
    - 419th Fighter Wing – Hill AFB, Utah
      - 466th Fighter Squadron
  - Air Force Materiel Command
    - 412th Test Wing – Edwards AFB, California
      - 461st Flight Test Squadron
  - Air National Guard
    - 104th Fighter Wing – Barnes ANGB, Massachusetts
      - 131st Fighter Squadron
    - 115th Fighter Wing – Truax Field ANGB, Wisconsin
      - 176th Fighter Squadron
    - 125th Fighter Wing – Jacksonville ANGB, Florida
      - 159th Fighter Squadron
    - 158th Fighter Wing – Burlington ANGB, Vermont
      - 134th Fighter Squadron
    - 173d Fighter Wing – Kingsley Field ANGB, Oregon (Planned for 2026)
      - 114th Fighter Squadron
    - 187th Fighter Wing – Dannelly Field ANGB, Alabama
      - 100th Fighter Squadron
  - Pacific Air Forces
    - 35th Fighter Wing – Misawa Air Base, Japan
      - 13th Fighter Squadron
    - 354th Fighter Wing – Eielson AFB, Alaska
      - 355th Fighter Squadron
      - 356th Fighter Squadron
  - United States Air Forces in Europe
    - 48th Fighter Wing – RAF Lakenheath, United Kingdom
      - 493d Fighter Squadron
      - 495th Fighter Squadron
- United States Navy
  - Operational Test and Evaluation Force
    - Air Test and Evaluation Squadron Nine(VX-9)-Naval Air Weapons Station China Lake

==== F-35I ====
Israel

- Israeli Air Force – "around 50" currently operational, from 75 ordered.
  - Nevatim Airbase, Nevatim
    - 140 Squadron
    - 116 Squadron
    - 117 Squadron
  - Tel Nof Airbase
    - Flight Test Center - Testbed aircraft

=== F-35B ===
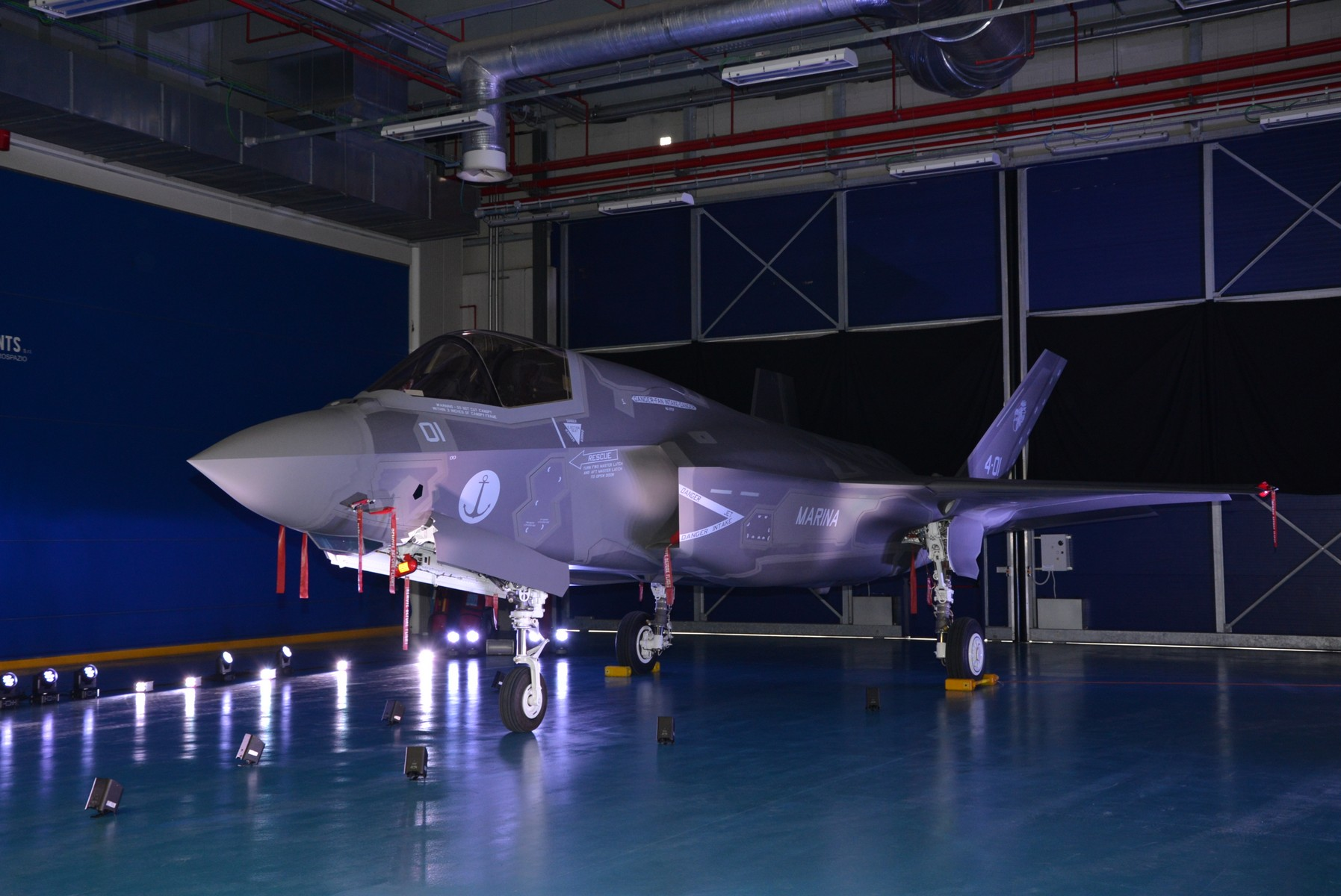
The first Italian F-35B

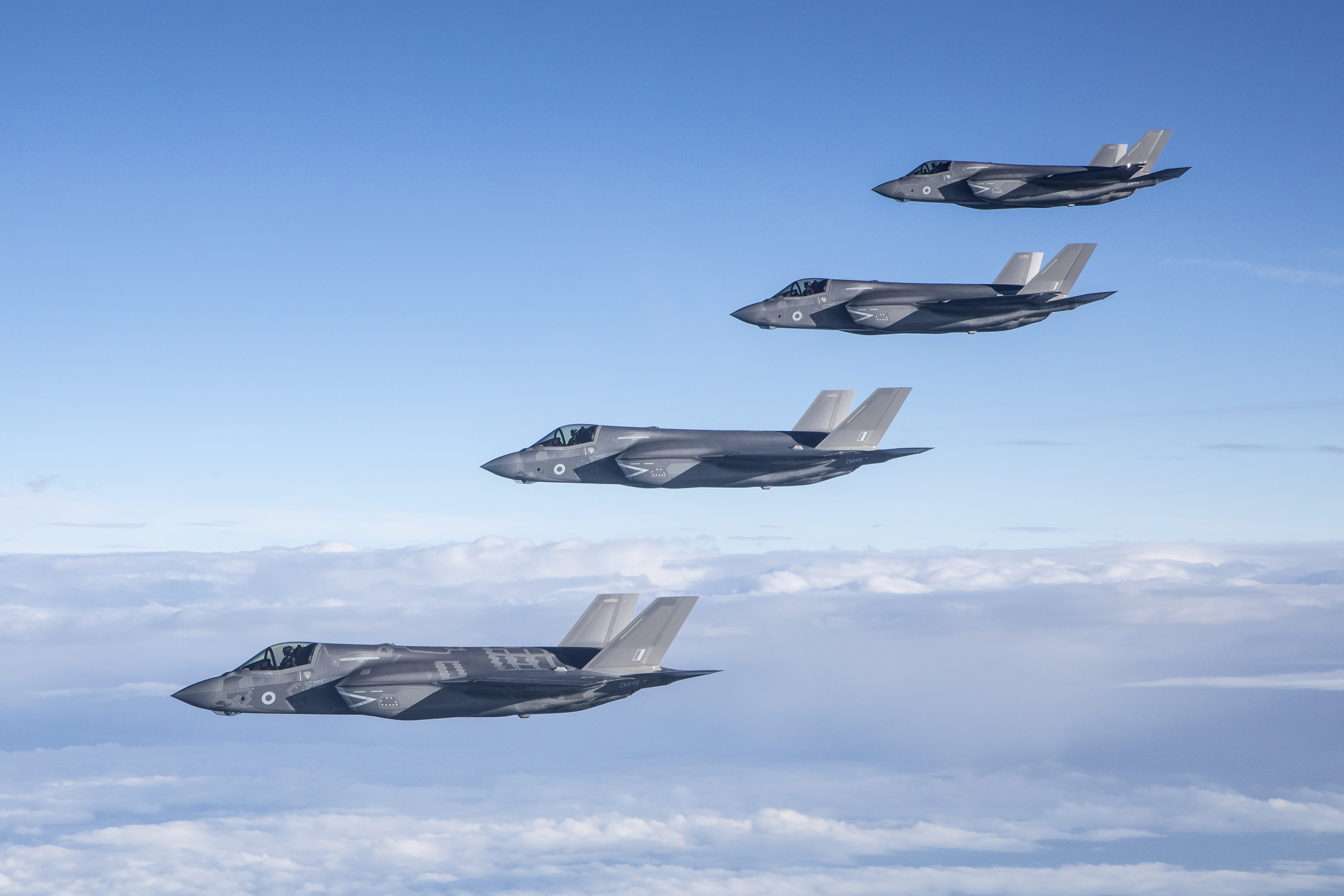
First four RAF F-35Bs on a delivery flight to RAF Marham, June 2018

Italy

- Italian Air Force – 5 delivered, out of 20 ordered.
  - Amendola Air Base, Apulia
    - 32º Stormo
- Italian Navy – 10 delivered, out of 20 ordered.
  - Gruppo Aerei Imbarcati

Japan

- Japan Air Self-Defense Force – 8 delivered out of at least 27 ordered, out of 42 planned, also planning to deploy to Nyutabaru Air Base.

Singapore

- Republic of Singapore Air Force – up to 12 planned.

United Kingdom - The first 48 delivered. 1 lost. 138 F35s planned over life of programme.

- Royal Air Force
  - Edwards Air Force Base, California, US
    - No. 17 Squadron (Operational Evaluation Unit) – 3 operated for testing
  - RAF Marham, Norfolk, UK
    - No. 207 Squadron (Operational Conversion Unit)
    - No. 617 Squadron
    - Additional unspecified squadron possible
- Royal Navy
  - RAF Marham, Norfolk, UK
    - 809 Naval Air Squadron
    - Additional unspecified squadron possible

United States

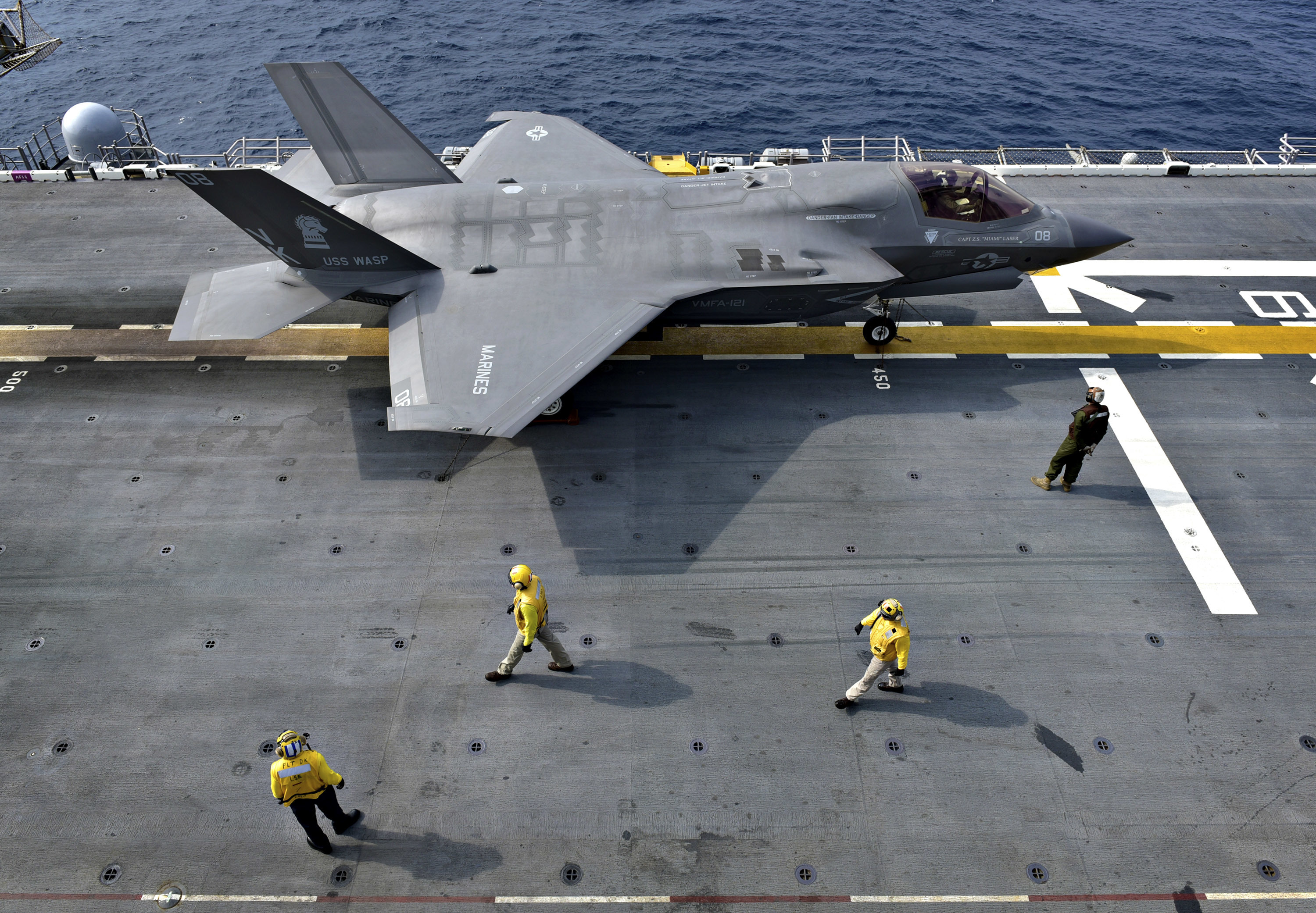
A USMC F-35B aboard USS Wasp

- United States Marine Corps – 280 planned.
  - MCAS Iwakuni, Japan
    - VMFA-121
    - VMFA-242
  - MCAS Yuma, Arizona
    - VMX-1
    - VMFA-122
    - VMFA-211
    - VMFA-214
    - VMFA-225
  - MCAS Beaufort, South Carolina
    - VMFAT-501
    - VMFA-533
    - VMFA-224
  - MCAS Cherry Point
    - VMFA-542
    - VMFA-231
  - MCAS Miramar, California
    - VMFAT-502

=== F-35C ===
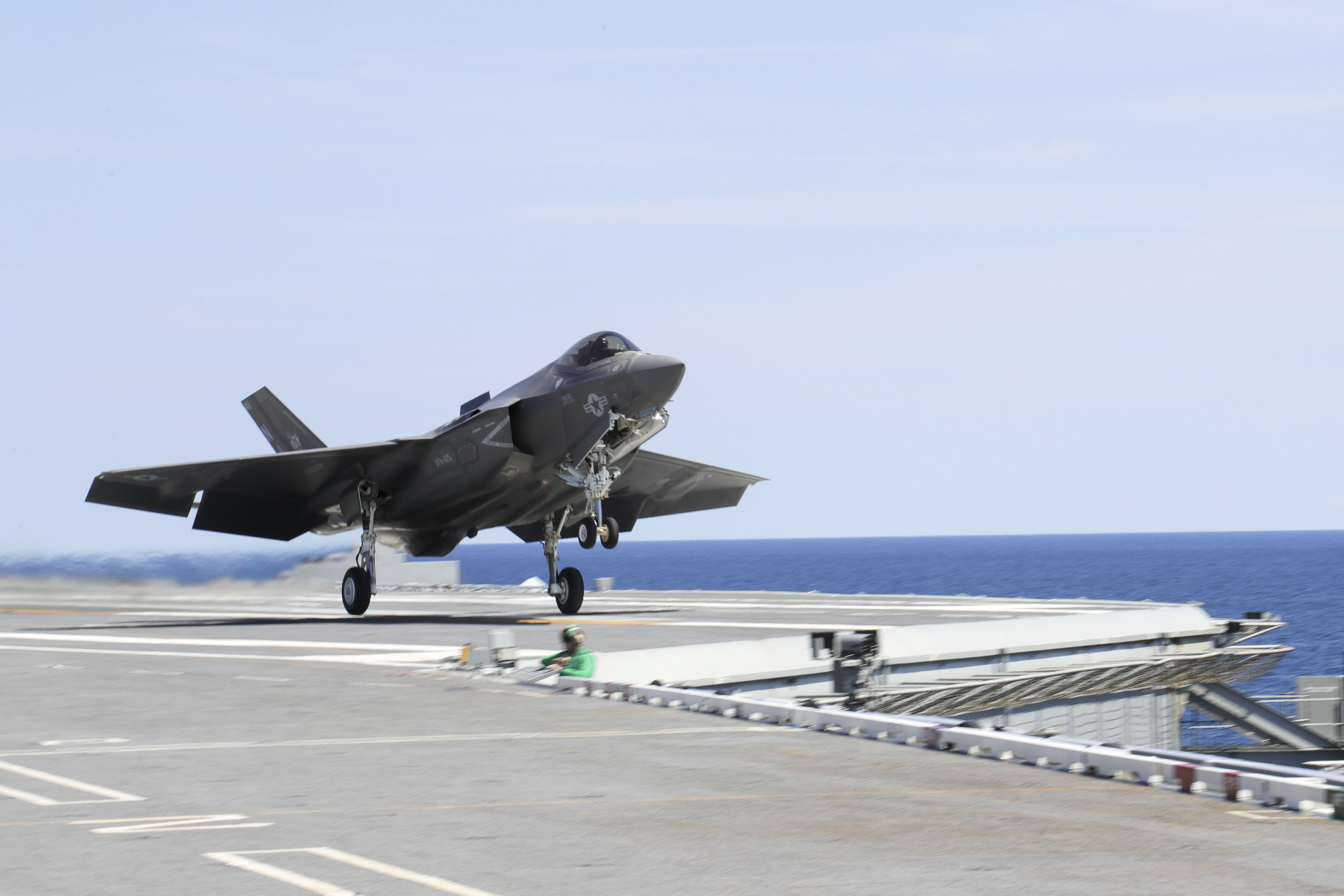
USN F-35C launches from USS Abraham Lincoln

United States

- United States Marine Corps – 140 planned.
  - Eglin AFB, Florida
    - VFA-101 (Note: Navy squadron that trained both Navy and Marine F-35C pilots, and operated Navy and Marine F-35Cs maintained by both sailors and Marines.) (2013–2019)
  - MCAS Cherry Point, North Carolina
    - VMFA-251
    - VMFA-115
  - MCAS Miramar, California
    - VMFA-311
    - VMFA-314
- United States Navy – 260 planned.
  - Edwards AFB, California
    - VX-9
  - NAS Patuxent River, Maryland
    - VX-23
  - Eglin AFB, Florida
    - VFA-101 (2013–2019)
  - NAS Lemoore, California
    - VFA-86
    - VFA-97
    - VFA-115
    - VFA-125
    - VFA-136 (Planned for 2028)
  - MCAS Iwakuni, Japan
    - VFA-147

== Potential operators ==
Morocco

- Royal Moroccan Air Force – It is reported that Morocco is interested in purchasing F-35s in a US$18 billion deal to counter Algeria's Su-57 acquisition.

India

- Indian Air Force – In February 2025, U.S. President Donald Trump had offered the F-35 to Prime Minister Narendra Modi of India, which as of March 2025, was also mulling a competing offer from Russia's Sukhoi Su-57. However, in late July 2025, Bloomberg reported that India has already rejected its requirement of the aircraft. While the Indian Ministry of Defence has not confirmed any of this, the Indian Ministry of External Affairs maintained that India has not held any formal discussions about the aircraft's procurement with the USA.

== Former potential operators ==
Republic of China

- Republic of China Air Force – In 2011, it was reported that Taiwan would procure a 5th Generation fighter such as the F-35. A renewed push for purchasing the F-35 happened in early 2017, and again in March 2018. However, by November 2018 it was reported that the Taiwanese military leadership abandoned the F-35 program in favor of the F-16V Viper. Reportedly, the decision was motivated by concerns about industry independence, and Chinese espionage concerns.

Spain

- Spanish Navy / Spanish Air Force – In 2023, the Spanish government included €6.25 billion in its budget requirements to begin the process of replacing combat aircraft used by both the Navy and the Air Force. The Navy's plan was to retire its AV-8B Harrier aircraft by 2030; due to Juan Carlos I being a STOVL aircraft carrier, the only feasible alternative to the Harrier was the F-35B. The Air Force were also looking at the F-35A to replace its F/A-18 Hornets while the Future Combat Air System was under development. However, in 2025, the government elected to end any interest in the procurement of either version of the F-35. For the Air Force, Spain instead elected to make new purchases of the Eurofighter Typhoon, while the Navy faced the potential of a fixed-wing aviation gap after 2030.

Thailand

- Royal Thai Air Force – 8 or 12 planned to replace F-16A/B Block 15 ADF in service. On 12 January 2022, Thailand's cabinet approved a budget for the first four F-35A, estimated at 13.8 billion baht in FY2023. On 22 May 2023 The United States Department of Defense has implied it will turn down Thailand's bid to buy F-35 fighter jets, and instead offer F-16V Viper and F-15EX Eagle II fighters, a Royal Thai Air Force source said.

Turkey

- Turkish Air Force – 4 F-35A delivered and withheld at Luke Air Force Base. 30 F-35s were ordered, of up to 100 total planned. Future purchases have been banned by the U.S. with contracts canceled by early 2020. On 1 February 2024 the U.S. expressed a willingness to readmit Turkey into the F-35 program in the event of a satisfactory resolution of the S-400 issue.

United Arab Emirates

- United Arab Emirates Air Force – Up to 50 had been planned, although the sale was suspended and reviewed by the Biden administration. In December 2021 UAE withdrew from the purchase of F-35s as it did not agree to the additional contract terms added by the US.

== Ship-based platforms ==
Ship-based platform activation includes:

- F-35B
  - United States
    - Wasp-class amphibious assault ship
      - USS Wasp
      - USS Essex
      - USS Kearsarge
      - USS Boxer
      - USS Bataan (planned for 2028)
      - USS Makin Island
    - America-class amphibious assault ship
      - USS America
      - USS Tripoli
  - United Kingdom
    - Queen Elizabeth-class aircraft carrier
      - HMS Queen Elizabeth
      - HMS Prince of Wales
  - Italy
    - Cavour-class aircraft carrier
      - Cavour
    - Trieste-class amphibious assault ship
      - Trieste
  - Japan
    - Izumo-class destroyer
      - JS Izumo (planned for 2027)
      - JS Kaga (planned for 2028)
- F-35C
  - United States
    - Nimitz-class aircraft carrier
      - USS Carl Vinson
      - USS Theodore Roosevelt
      - USS Abraham Lincoln
      - USS George Washington
      - USS John C. Stennis (planned for 2028)
      - USS Ronald Reagan
    - Gerald R. Ford-class aircraft carrier
      - USS John F. Kennedy (planned for 2028)

== See also ==
- Lockheed Martin F-35 Lightning II procurement
