= No. 21 Squadron (Finland) =

Finnish Air Force fighter squadron

Fighter Squadron 21 (Hävittäjälentolaivue 21, HävLLv 21) was a Finnish fighter squadron located in Pirkkala, near Tampere. It was the operational part of the Satakunta Air Command. The squadron was disbanded in June 2014, with the fighters being split between Karelian Air Command and Lapland Air Command.

== Organization ==
1st Flight
Fighter flight, flew F-18C/D and also trained mechanics
2nd Flight
Fighter flight, flew F-18C/D and trained pilots
Liaison Flight
Flew Valmet Vinka, PA-31-350 Chieftain, and Valmet L-90TP Redigo aircraft

== Sources ==
- www.ilmavoimat.fi
