= Satakunta Air Wing =

- Satakunnan Lennosto (Finnish); Satakunta flygflottilj (Swedish)
- Distinctive unit insignia of the Satakunta Air Wing
- Active: 1918–
- Country: Finland
- Branch: Finnish Air Force
- Garrison/HQ: Pirkkala, Tampere Airport
- March: Lentäjän marssi
- Anniversaries: 1st of August
- Engagements: Winter War; Continuation War

Commanders
- Current commander: Colonel Markus Leivo

Insignia
- Flag

The Satakunta Air Wing (Finnish: Satakunnan Lennosto, abbr. SatLsto; Swedish: Satakunta flygflottilj) is a peace-time Finnish Air Force unit. Its headquarters are not located in the present-day province of Satakunta, but in historical Satakunta and in the present-day province of Pirkanmaa, at the Tampere-Pirkkala Airport in Pirkkala.

It is responsible for maintaining the prerequisites for operation in Southern Finland for the Finnish Air Force. It studies and develops air combat procedures and equipment. It operates from bases in Southern Finland, also supporting Finnish Army troops.

== History ==
The Satakunta Wing was founded on 26 June 1918 in Sortavala and was moved to Suur-Merijoki, near Viipuri in 1938. The unit was disbanded after the Winter War, but reinstated in Aunus in 1942. In 1944 the unit was moved to Pori Airport and it was equipped with Messerschmitt Bf 109s. It was the first unit of the Finnish Air Force to be equipped with jet aircraft, when it received its De Havilland Vampires. It was later to receive Folland Gnats and MiG-21s. The unit was renamed into the "Satakunta Wing" in 1957 and the headquarters was moved to Tampere in 1965. The Fighter Squadron 21 was moved to the Pirkkala Airport in 1985 and it was the first unit to be equipped with F-18 Hornet fighters in 1995.

The Fighter Squadron 21 was the operational unit of the wing. It was disbanded in summer 2014, with fighters relocated to Karelian Air Command and Lapland Air Command. At the same time, Satakunta Air Command was given new tasks: transport flights and flight research. The former flight research center in Halli was amalgamated into Satakunta Air Command's Air Combat Centre.

In 2023 the English name for Satakunta Air Command was changed to Satakunta Air Wing along with the two other Air Commands.

== Organization ==
Organization of Satakunta Air Wing is:

- Headquarters
- Supporting Air Operations Squadron
- Air Combat Centre
- Aircraft Maintenance Squadron
- Communications Flight
- Logistics Flight
- Force Protection Squadron
