= Inka Niskanen =

Finnish fighter pilot

- Born: 1973 or 1974 (age 51–52)
- Education: National Defence University
- Military career
- Allegiance: Finland
- Branch: Finnish Air Force
- Rank: Colonel

Col Inka Niskanen is an officer and fighter pilot in the Finnish Air Force. She is notable as the first woman in Finland to qualify to pilot a fighter jet; the first to command an air force squadron; and the first to reach, upon her promotion in December 2025, the rank of colonel.

In 1997, Niskanen volunteered for national military service (which for women is not mandatory in Finland) at the Training Air Wing, Finnish Air Force, at Kauhava. Following that, in 1998, she was accepted as the first female cadet into the air force officer training programme at the National Defence University, which she completed in 2002, being commissioned as a flight officer, and qualifying to fly the Hornet fighter jets.

In 2014, Niskanen was promoted to major and in the summer of 2018 to lieutenant colonel. In January 2019, Niskanen took command of the Karelia Air Command 31 Squadron, as the first woman to hold such a post in Finland.

From August 2021, Niskanen worked at the National Defence University as the lead lecturer in aerial warfare studies, until January 2025 when she was appointed special aide to Finland's Chief of Defence.
