= Pöljä =

- Village
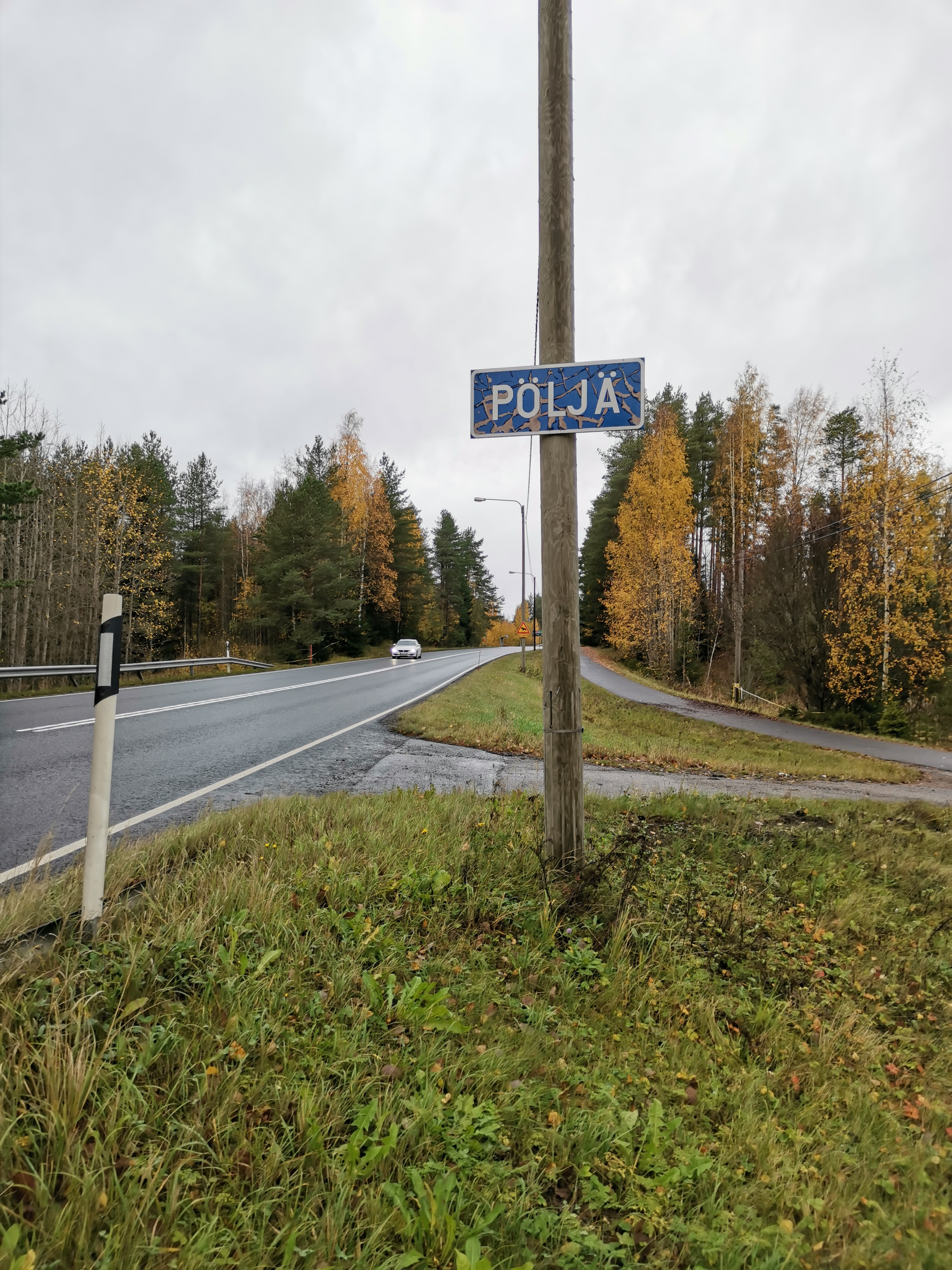
- A sign of Pöljä along the Highway 5.

- Location in Finland
- Coordinates: 63°08′55″N 027°36′15″E
- Country: Finland
- Region: North Savo
- Municipality: Siilinjärvi

Area
  - Total: 3.76 km^{2} (1.45 sq mi)

Population (31 December 2021)
  - Total: 377
  - Density: 100.3/km^{2} (260/sq mi)
- Time zone: UTC+2 (EET)
  - Summer (DST): UTC+3 (EEST)
- Postal code: 71820

Pöljä (Finnish pronunciation: [ˈpøljæ]) is a village in the northern part of the Siilinjärvi municipality in North Savo, Finland. At the end of 2021, the village had 377 inhabitants. It is located along the Highway 5 (E63), about 10 kilometres (6.2 mi) north of the Siilinjärvi's centre and about 30 kilometres (19 mi) north of the city of Kuopio. Lake Pöljä (Pöljänjärvi) is located near the village.

Pöljä's local buildings include the elementary school (for students in grades 1–6), the local history museum and the former workers' house, which currently serves as an association building owned by Pöljän Eräveikot. Other historical local buildings include the former railway station building. The village is also known as the discovery site of various Stone Age objects, and one Stone Age asbestos-ceramic type has even been named Pöljä type ceramic after the discovery site.

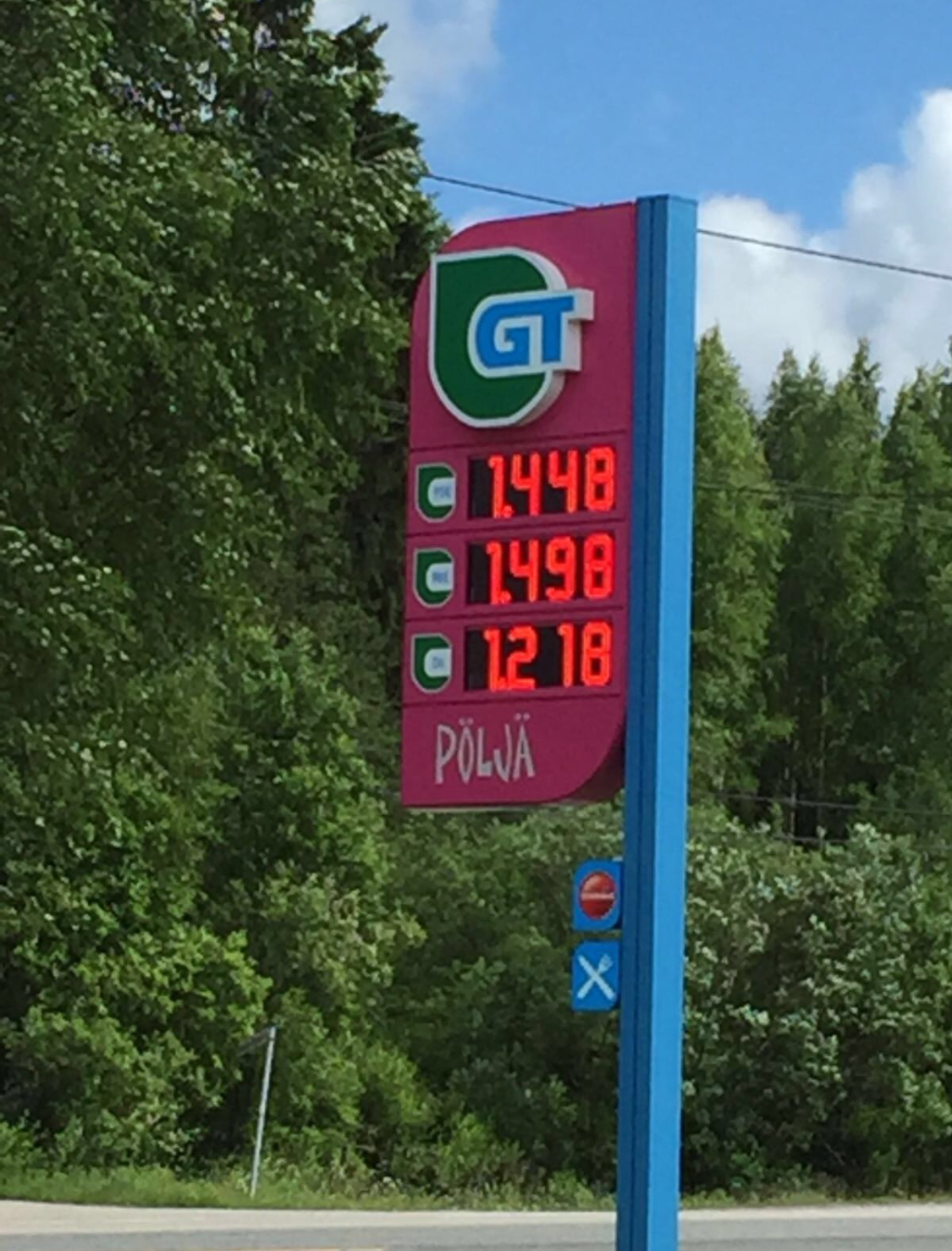
Pöljä gas station.

The name of the village literally means "dumb person", but the locals have given at least a couple of explanations for the origin of the name. According to the first claim, the first inhabitant of the village of Pöljä would have been a Swedish "war lord" named Bölja, who received a military service house from the crown, and whose name would have changed to Pöljä in the mouth of the Savonians. According to another belief, the name comes from the fact that when the first inhabitant came to the region, the lake would have waved (Swedish bölja for a "wave") so much that the lake and the village would have been named after it.

In 2015, Pöljä was awarded as North Savo's village of the year.
