= Siilinjärvi =

- Municipality
- Siilinjärven kunta Siilinjärvi kommun
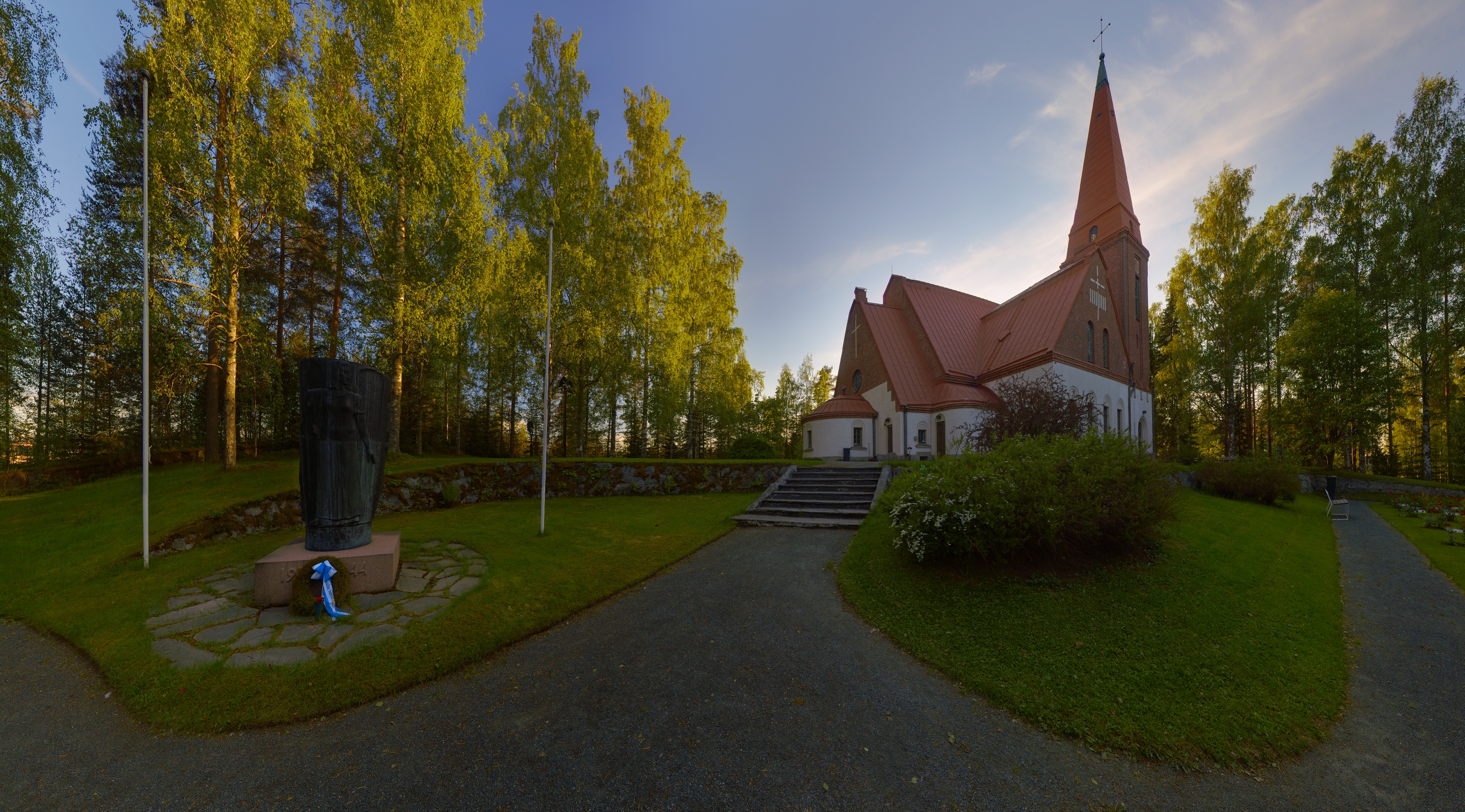
- Siilinjärvi church

- Coat of arms

- Location of Siilinjärvi in Finland
- Interactive map of Siilinjärvi
- Coordinates: 63°04′30″N 27°39′36″E
- Country: Finland
- Region: North Savo
- Sub-region: Kuopio
- Charter: 1925

Government
  - Municipal manager: Vesa Lötjönen

Area (2018-01-01)
  - Total: 507.81 km^{2} (196.07 sq mi)
  - Land: 401 km^{2} (155 sq mi)
  - Water: 106.85 km^{2} (41.26 sq mi)
  - Rank: 203rd largest in Finland

Population (2025-12-31)
  - Total: 21,348
  - Rank: 47th largest in Finland
  - Density: 53.24/km^{2} (137.9/sq mi)

Population by native language
  - Finnish: 97.4% (official)
  - Swedish: 0.1%
  - Others: 2.5%

Population by age
  - 0 to 14: 19.4%
  - 15 to 64: 59.3%
  - 65 or older: 21.3%
- Time zone: UTC+02:00 (EET)
  - Summer (DST): UTC+03:00 (EEST)
- Website: www.siilinjarvi.fi

Siilinjärvi (Finnish: [ˈsiːlinˌjærʋi]) is a municipality of Finland. It is located in North Savo, 20 kilometres (12 mi) north of the city of Kuopio, which largely surrounds Siilinjärvi. Another neighbour municipality with Kuopio is Lapinlahti. The name, in Finnish, apparently translates literally as "Hedgehog's Lake", although its etymology actually stems from a Sámi word meaning "winter dwelling". Lakes are essential part of the geography of Siilinjärvi. There are 123 lakes, and the biggest of them are Kallavesi and Juurusvesi–Akonvesi. Water area is 106.85 km^{2}, which is 21% of the whole area of Siilinjärvi.

The median age is relatively low; 23% of the population are under 15 years old. Siilinjärvi has eleven elementary schools and two secondary schools (one is located in Suininlahti and one downtown).

The Kuopio Airport is located in the village of Rissala in Siilinjärvi along the Highway 9. The airport is also the home of the Karelian Air Command and the 31st Squadron of the Finnish Air Force.

Siilinjärvi is the birthplace of politician and former prime minister of Finland and European Commissioner Jyrki Katainen.

== Economy ==
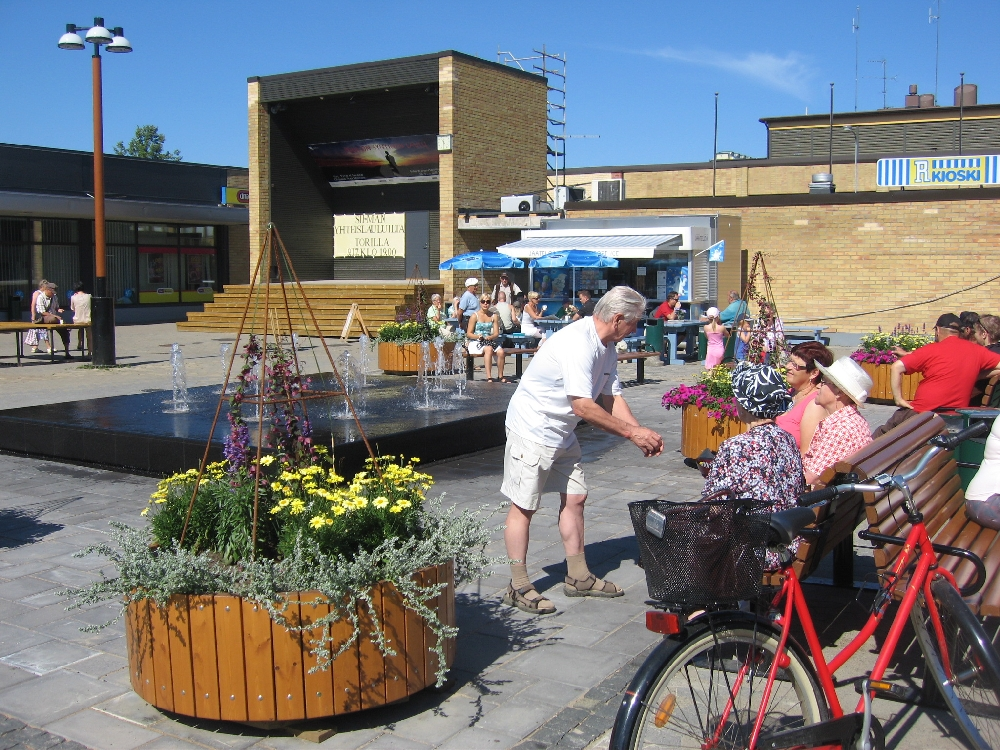
Siilinjärvi Market Square

The main sources of income are services and industry. One of the most important employers in Siilinjärvi is Siilinjärvi apatite mine owned by Yara International. The other largest companies in Siilinjärvi are Yara International's factory and apatite mine, Lujabetoni Oy, Hydroline Oy, Recreational Pool Fontanella and Spa Hotel Kunnonpaikka. 5% of jobs are in primary production, 29% in industry and construction and 66% in services. Unemployment figures are the lowest in North Savo, averaging 9,4% in 2016, while at the same time the average unemployment rate in North Savo was 13,4% and in the whole country 13,2%.

Siilinjärvi's income tax rate in 2017 was 21,25.

== Services ==
=== Energy production and water supply ===
The use of district heating has increased in recent years. Most of the district heat is produced from the Yara plant's process waste heat and from Savon Voima's Tiprusniemi bioheat plant. At the Tiprusniemi bioheat center, heat is produced with domestic wood fuel. In addition, Sulkavantie has a LPG back-up and peak heating center.

In Siilinjärvi, groundwater is used as raw water, which is obtained from three groundwater intakes, two of which are located in the church village and one in the Toivala-Vuorela area. In addition to the municipal water supply plant, there are 15 water cooperatives in the municipality's sparsely populated areas.

=== Fire and rescue services ===
There are two fire stations in the Siilinjärvi municipality, the North Savo Rescue Department station and the Yara TPK station. Siilinjärvi's main fire station is located in Simonsalo at Sulkavantie 6, a few minutes' drive from the center of Siilinjärvi. The station has a 24-hour on-call service. Station 15 houses an inspection car PS 020, a fire truck PS 151, a fire truck PS 1512, a tank truck PS 153, a crew transport, an off-road and boat tractor PS 157, and a snowmobile and boat. Yara TPK has a fire truck PS 191 and a boat. In addition, it has been proposed to build a third fire station in Siilinjärvi near the Vuorela residential area.

== Culture ==
A local newspaper called Uutis-Jousi is published in Siilinjärvi. Siilinjärvi also has its own library.

=== Food ===
In the 1980s, each municipality in Savo selected its own parish dishes. For Siilinjärvi, the choice were patakukko, a type of kalakukko; potattivelli, a potato gruel; and a red berry kissel with whipped cream.

== Notable people ==
- Katri-Helena Eskelinen (1925–2014), Finnish politician
- Jessica Grabowsky (born 1980), Finnish actress
- Ilkka Herola (born 1995), Finnish skier
- Jyrki Katainen (born 1971), Finnish politician
- Sanni Leinonen (born 1989), Finnish alpine skier
- Eetu Luostarinen (born 1998), Finnish ice hockey player
- MC Raaka Pee (born 1980), Finnish musician
- Topi Piipponen (born 1997), Finnish professional ice hockey player
- Kimmo Savolainen (born 1974), Finnish ski jumper
- Sexmane (born 2000), Finnish musician
- Sampo Voutilainen (born 1997), Finnish pistol shooter

== International relations ==
=== Twin towns — Sister cities ===
Siilinjärvi is twinned with:

- Sunne, Sweden
- Elverum, Norway
- Haslev, Denmark
- Hajdúböszörmény, Hungary
- Kamennogorsk, Russia
- Amberg, Germany

== See also ==
- Finnish national road 5 (E63)
- Kuopio Airport
- Lake Kallavesi
- Pöljä, a village in Siilinjärvi
- Siilinjärvi Football Club
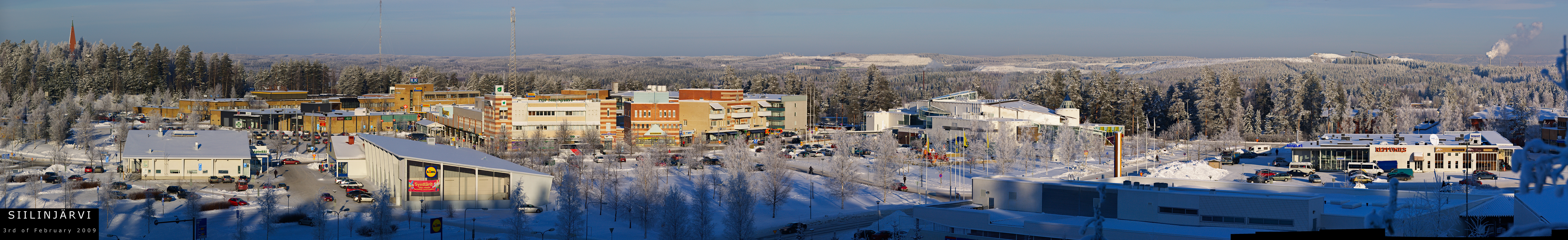
A panoramic view over Siilinjärvi town centre in winter.
