= Hydroline =

Finnish manufacturing company

Hydroline Oy
- Company type: Privately Held
- Industry: Mechanical or Industrial Engineering
- Founded: 1962
- Headquarters: Siilinjärvi, Finland
- Key people: Jukka Laakkonen (Managing Director)
- Products: Hydraulic Cylinders
- Number of employees: 200 (2012)
- Website: www.hydroline.fi

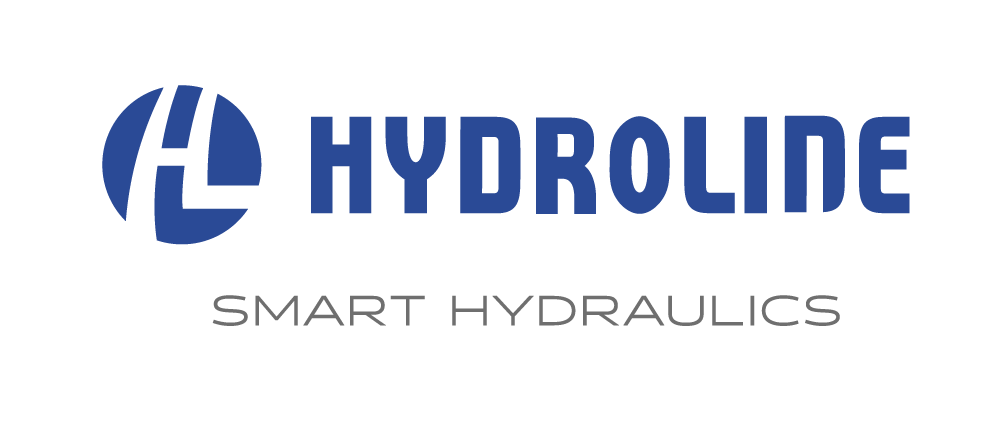
Hydroline's logo and slogan

Hydroline designs and manufactures durable, heavy-duty hydraulic cylinders. The Finnish company was founded in the early 1960s as a metal lathing shop.

The family-owned company employs two hundred people. Its main production facility is located near to Kuopio, Finland.

== Products ==
Cylinders operate as a part of complex entities and applications. Hydroline produces and designs over 1500 different cylinder models for automotive manufacturing, mining, forest machinery and tractor, hoisting and transfer, and earthworks industries. Each cylinder model is custom-tailored to meet each customer's specifications.

Hydroline is specialized in design and manufacturing of hydraulic cylinders, R&D services and testing.

== History ==
The company was founded in 1962 in a basement in Kuopio, Finland. First cylinders were manufactured already in 1960s. After several years of steady expansion, the company headquarters moved to its current site in the Vuorela Industrial Zone, situated in Eastern Finland.

Hydroline has expanded from a one-man turning shop to an international company. Nine out of ten Hydroline cylinders are delivered to applications destined for the export market. Besides, the company has its own sales office in China. Hydroline Poland sp. z o.o. was established in July 2012.
