= Rovaniemi Air Defence Battalion =

- Rovaniemen ilmatorjuntapatteristo
- Founded: 1989
- Country: Finland
- Branch: Army
- Type: Air defense
- Size: Battalion
- Part of: Jaeger Brigade
- Garrison/HQ: Rovaniemi

Rovaniemi Air Defence Battalion (Finnish: Rovaniemen ilmatorjuntapatteristo) was a unit of the Finnish Army located in Rovaniemi. It was founded in 1989 as a brigade-level unit with the name Lapland Air Defence Regiment (Finnish: Lapin ilmatorjuntarykmentti). In 2015, the Regiment was disabanded and its battalion-level unit Rovaniemi Air Defence Battalion was attached to the Jaeger Brigade.

== Organisation ==
Rovaniemi Air Defence Battalion (Rovaniemen Ilmatorjuntapatteristo, ROVITPSTO)

- 1st Air Defence Battery (Finnish: 1. Ilmatorjuntapatteri)
- 2nd Air Defence Battery (Finnish: 2. Ilmatorjuntapatteri)
- Airbase Support Company (Finnish: Tukikohtakomppania)

1st Air Defence Battery trained conscripts for ground based air defence systems and guns such as Crotale NG and 23 ITK 61. 2nd Air Defence Battery trained most of the NCOs of the Battalion as well as some ground based air defence support troops, for example targeting radar platoons and operation centres. The Airbase Support Company trained logistics platoons of varying types. It also trained all the military drivers of the battalion and all the military police personnel of the Jaeger Brigade.

The Air Force conscripts with special training such as assistant aircraft mechanician NCOs who served in Lapland Air Command were administratively part of the Airbase Support Company of the Battalion.

== Equipment ==
- Crotale NG (Ilmatorjuntaohjus 90M Crotale NG)
- ZU-23-2 (23 ITK 61 and 23 ITK 95)
