= Flying Regiment 2, Finnish Air Force =

- Active: 1 January 1938 – 1952
- Country: Finland
- Branch: Finnish Air Force
- Role: Reconnaissance and ground attack
- Engagements: Winter War, Continuation War, Lapland War

Flying Regiment 2 (Finnish: Lentorykmentti 2 or LentoR 2, renamed on 5 May 1942 into LeR 2) was fighter regiment of the Finnish Air Force during World War II. It was active from 1 January 1938 to 1952.

== Organization ==
=== Winter War ===
- No. 22 Squadron: fighter squadron
- No. 24 Squadron: fighter squadron
- No. 26 Squadron: fighter squadron
- No. 28 Squadron: fighter squadron

=== Continuation War ===
- HQ
- HQ Company
- No. 16 Squadron: reconnaissance squadron, attached to LeR 2 on 6 May 1942.
- No. 12 Squadron: fighter squadron
- No. 26 Squadron: fighter squadron
- No. 28 Squadron: fighter squadron
- No. 25 Supplement Squadron

==== Maintenance companies ====
- 3rd Airfield Company (3. Lentokenttäkomppania or 3.Le.KenttäK)
- 4th Airfield Company (4. Lentokenttäkomppania or 4.Le.KenttäK)

=== Lapland War ===
- No. 14 Squadron: fighter squadron
- No. 26 Squadron: fighter squadron
- No. 28 Squadron: fighter squadron

The equipment consisted among others of Fokker D.XXIs, Morane-Saulnier MS.406s, Brewster Buffaloes, Messerschmitt Bf 109Gs, Bristol Bulldog Mk.IVs, Fiat G.50s, Hawker Hurricane Mk.Is, Gloster Gladiator Mk.IIs, Polikarpov I-153s, Mörkö-Moranes, Fokker C.Xs, and Westland Lysander Mk.Is.
