= Jaeger Brigade =

- Jääkäriprikaati
- Insignia of the Jaeger Brigade.
- Active: 1919–1921:Käkisalmen rykmentti (Käkisalmi Regiment); 1921–1936: Polkupyöräpataljoona 1 (Bicycle Battalion 1); 1936–1957: Jääkäripataljoona 1 (Jaeger Battalion 1); 1957–1964: Pohjanmaan jääkäripataljoona (Ostrobothnia Jaeger Battalion); 1964–1979: Lapin Jääkäripataljoona (Lapland Jaeger Battalion); 1979–: Jääkäriprikaati Jaeger Brigade
- Country: Finland
- Branch: Finnish Army
- Type: Infantry and Anti-Air
- Role: Arctic forces and Anti-aircraft warfare training
- Size: 2,200 conscripts, 400 career personnel
- Garrison: Sodankylä and Rovaniemi
- Nickname(s): Jiipeeär, Jipri
- Flag
- March: The Jäger March by Jean Sibelius
- Equipment: Sisu Nasu, Bandvagn 206, Leopard 2A4
- Website: https://maavoimat.fi/en/jaeger-brigade

Commanders
- Colonel: Kimmo Kinnunen

The Jaeger Brigade (Finnish: Jääkäriprikaati; Swedish: Jägarbrigaden) is a unit of the Finnish Army. The unit is located in Sodankylä and Rovaniemi in Finnish Lapland, some 130 kilometres (81 mi) north of the Arctic Circle. The brigade trains 2,200 conscripts per year. The brigade has two main units: Lapland Jaeger Battalion in Sodankylä and Rovaniemi Air Defence Battalion at Rovaniemi air base.

The Jaeger Brigade specialises in training soldiers for the harsh climate of Lapland. The brigade is also responsible for developing arctic warfare tactics and equipment in cooperation with Swedish and Norwegian arctic forces. Their expertise in cold-weather warfare is widely recognized; members of the U.S. and other militaries come to Sodankylä in winter to learn from them.

Troops are motorized by all-terrain vehicles Sisu Nasu and Bandvagn 206 due to their better movement in arctic conditions compared to heavily armed vehicles.

== Organisation ==
- Lapland Jaeger Battalion (Lapin Jääkäripataljoona) in Sodankylä
  - 1st Jaeger Company (1. Jääkärikomppania)
  - 2nd Jaeger Company (2. Jääkärikomppania)
  - 3rd Jaeger Company (3. Jääkärikomppania)
  - Logistics Company (Huoltokomppania)
  - Support Company (Tukikomppania)
- Rovaniemi Air Defence Battalion (Rovaniemen Ilmatorjuntapatteristo)
  - 1st Air Defence Battery (1. Ilmatorjuntapatteri)
  - 2nd Air Defence Battery (2. Ilmatorjuntapatteri)
  - Base Company (Tukikohtakomppania)

== History ==
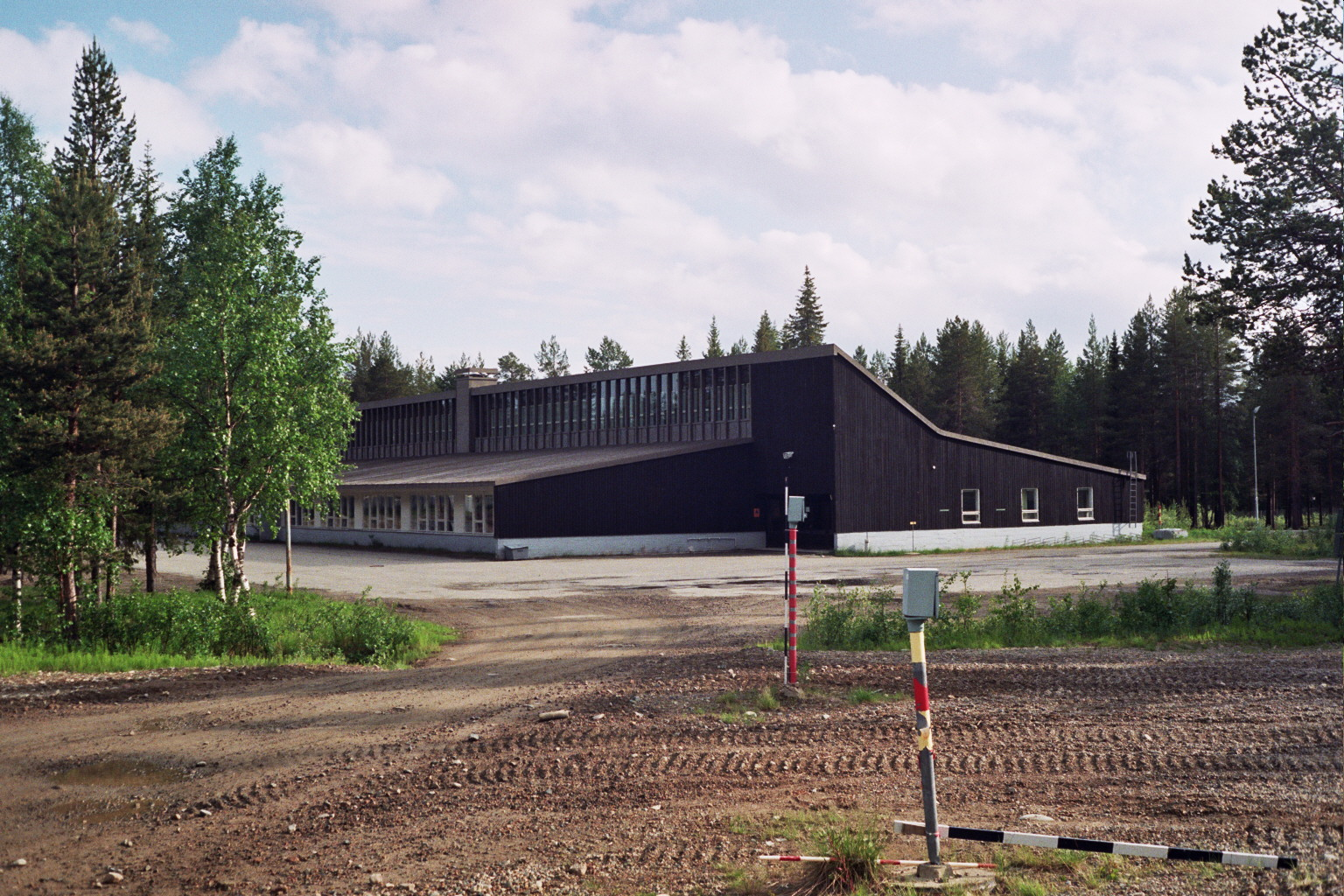
A barracks building of the Jaeger Brigade at Sodankylä

The Brigade follows the traditions of the 27th Prussian Jaeger Battalion, JR 27 (27th Infantry regiment) (which fought during the Finnish Civil War) and the 6th Division (which fought during the Continuation War). In addition, the Brigade carries the traditions of Pohja Brigade, Ostrobothnia Jaeger Battalion (Finnish: Pohjanmaan Jääkäripataljoona) In addition to these, the Brigade carries the traditions of numerous other historical units that have either been its organisational predecessors or manned by the men of Lapland.

The Lapland Jaeger Battalion traces back its roots to the 1st Bicycle Battalion, founded in 1921. That unit later formed the 1st Jaeger Battalion which fought during the Winter War and the Continuation War.

Rovaniemi Air Defence Battalion traces its lineage to the 151st Light Air Defence Battery, founded in 1941. In 1944, following the Continuation War, this unit became the 1st Battalion of Air Defence Regiment 2. In 1967, the unit received the provincial name of Ostrobothnia Air Defence Battalion (Finnish: Pohjanmaan Ilmatorjuntapatteristo), which was changed to the current name in 1974. During 1989–2014, the battalion was part of Lapland Air Defence Regiment.
