= No. 22 Squadron (Finland) =

No. 22 Squadron Finnish Air Force
- Active: 10 January 1940 - 13 March 1940
- Country: Finland
- Branch: Finnish Air Force
- Role: fighter
- Engagements: Winter War

No. 22 Squadron (Finnish: Lentolaivue 22 or LLv.22) was a fighter squadron of the Finnish Air Force during World War II. The squadron was part of Flying Regiment 2. It was to be equipped with new Brewster Buffaloes and Hawker Hurricane Is, but only the first Flight saw action during the war. After the Winter War, the squadron was attached to the new Flying Regiment 3 and renamed as No. 32 Squadron.

== Organization ==
=== Winter War ===
- 1st Flight (1. Lentue)
- 2nd Flight (2. Lentue)
- 3rd Flight (3. Lentue)
- Detachment Räty (Os. Räty/LLv.22) formed to collect the Hurricanes and to train pilots on the aircraft. Aircraft arrived too late to participate in the war.

The equipment consisted of 5 Brewster Buffaloes, and 10 Hawker Hurricane Is.

== Bibliography ==
- Keskinen, Kalevi; Stenman, Kari & Niska, Klaus (1995). Brewster Model 239. Suomen ilmavoimien historia. Vol. 1 (4th ed.). Tampere, Finland: Apali. ISBN 952-5026-02-7.
- Shores, Christopher F. (1969). Finnish Air Force 1918–1968. Aircam Aviation Series. Vol. S2. Canterbury, UK: Osprey Publications. ISBN 0-85045-012-8.
