= Kuopio Airport =

Airport in Siilinjärvi, Finland

Kuopio Airport Kuopion lentoasema

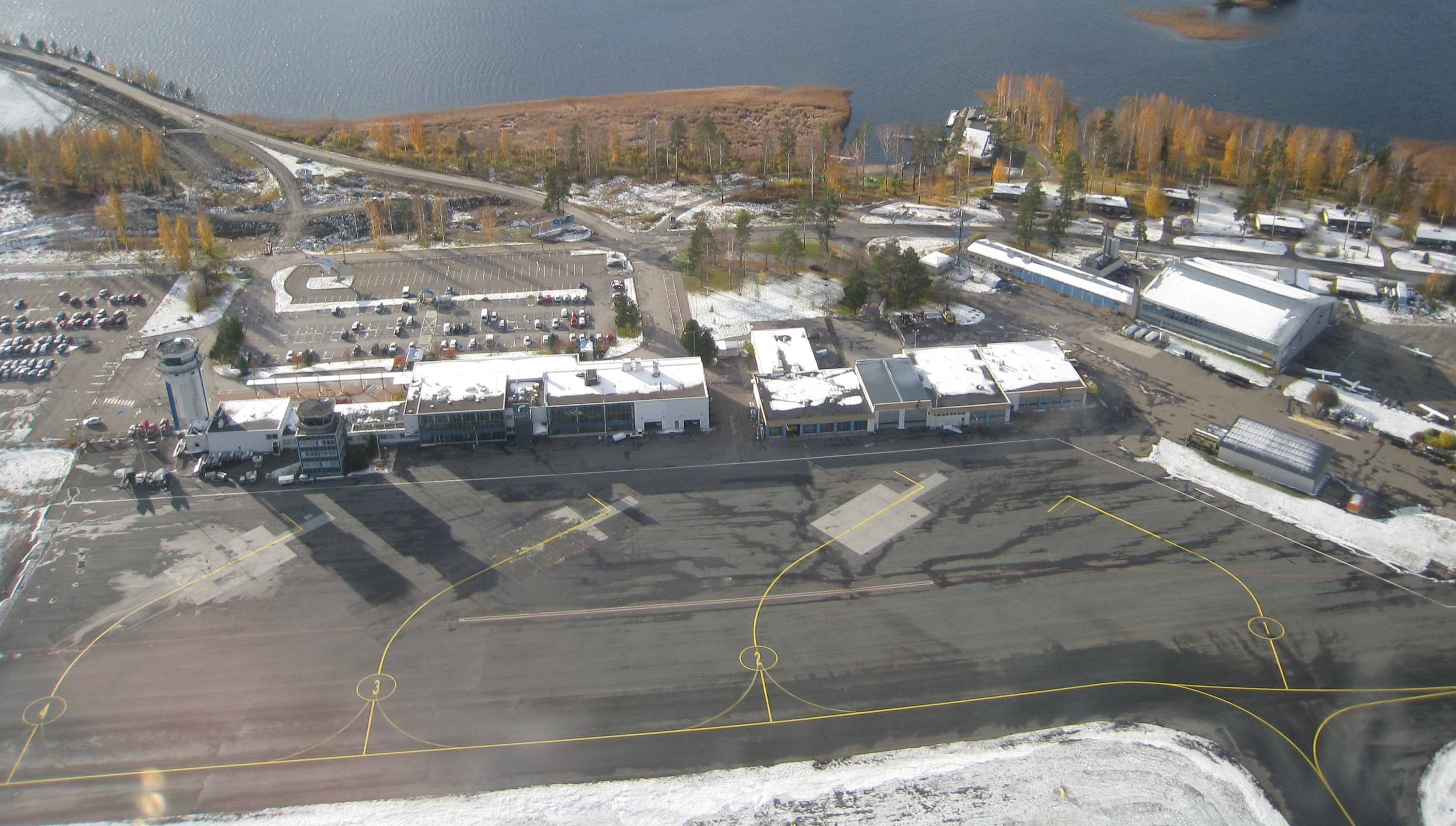
- IATA: KUO; ICAO: EFKU

Summary
- Airport type: Public / military
- Operator: Finavia
- Serves: Kuopio, Finland
- Location: Rissala, Siilinjärvi, Finland
- Elevation AMSL: 323 ft (98 m)
- Coordinates: 63°00′31″N 027°47′40″E

Map
- Location within Finland

Runways
Direction	Length		Surface
Direction	m	ft	Surface
15/33	2,800	9,186	Asphalt

Statistics (2017)
- Passengers: 235,411
- Landings: 2,023
- Source: AIP Finland

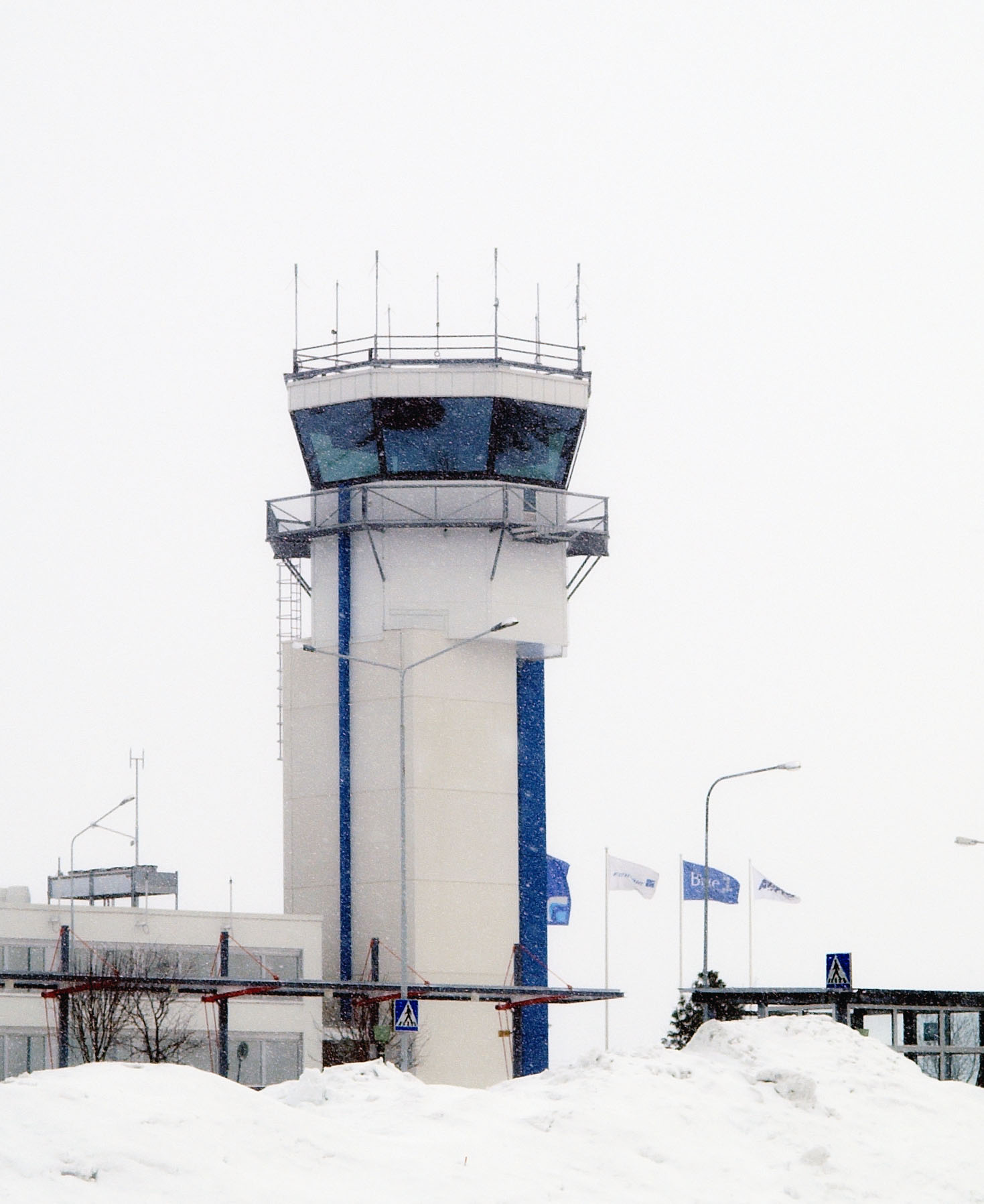
The new air traffic control tower

Kuopio Airport (IATA: KUO, ICAO: EFKU) is an airport in Rissala, Siilinjärvi, Finland, about 14 kilometres (9 mi) north of Kuopio city centre. It is the fifth busiest airport in Finland, as measured by the number of passengers, approximately 235,000 in 2017.

== History ==
Kuopio Airport was completed in November 1939 and flight operations started in May 1940. It was used by the Luftwaffe during World War II (1942–43). During the Continuation War the runways were made from plywood. The first terminal building was opened in 1949 before a new one replaced it in 1971.

In 2004, Kuopio Airport was chosen as the Airport of the Year in Finland. As of 2006, it was one of only five profitable airports in Finland, thanks to shared use of the runways by the Karelian Air Command of the Finnish Air Force and civilian airlines. Kuopio had its first international scheduled route when AirBaltic operated direct flights to Riga in 2008–2011.

== Lake terminal ==
A unique airport “Lake” terminal was completed in March 2008 (at 63°00′35″N 27°47′1″E). The terminal is situated 250 metres (820 ft) walking distance from the main airport terminal. It connects the airport to the Lake Saimaa region. Lake Saimaa offers a waterway connection to the cities of the Finnish Lakeland: Imatra, Joensuu, Kuopio, Lappeenranta, Mikkeli, Savonlinna and Varkaus. Vuoksi River flows from Saimaa to Lake Ladoga (Russia). Saimaa Canal connects Saimaa with the Gulf of Finland. There is no scheduled daily boat line here, but tour operators can use the terminal.

== Airlines and destinations ==
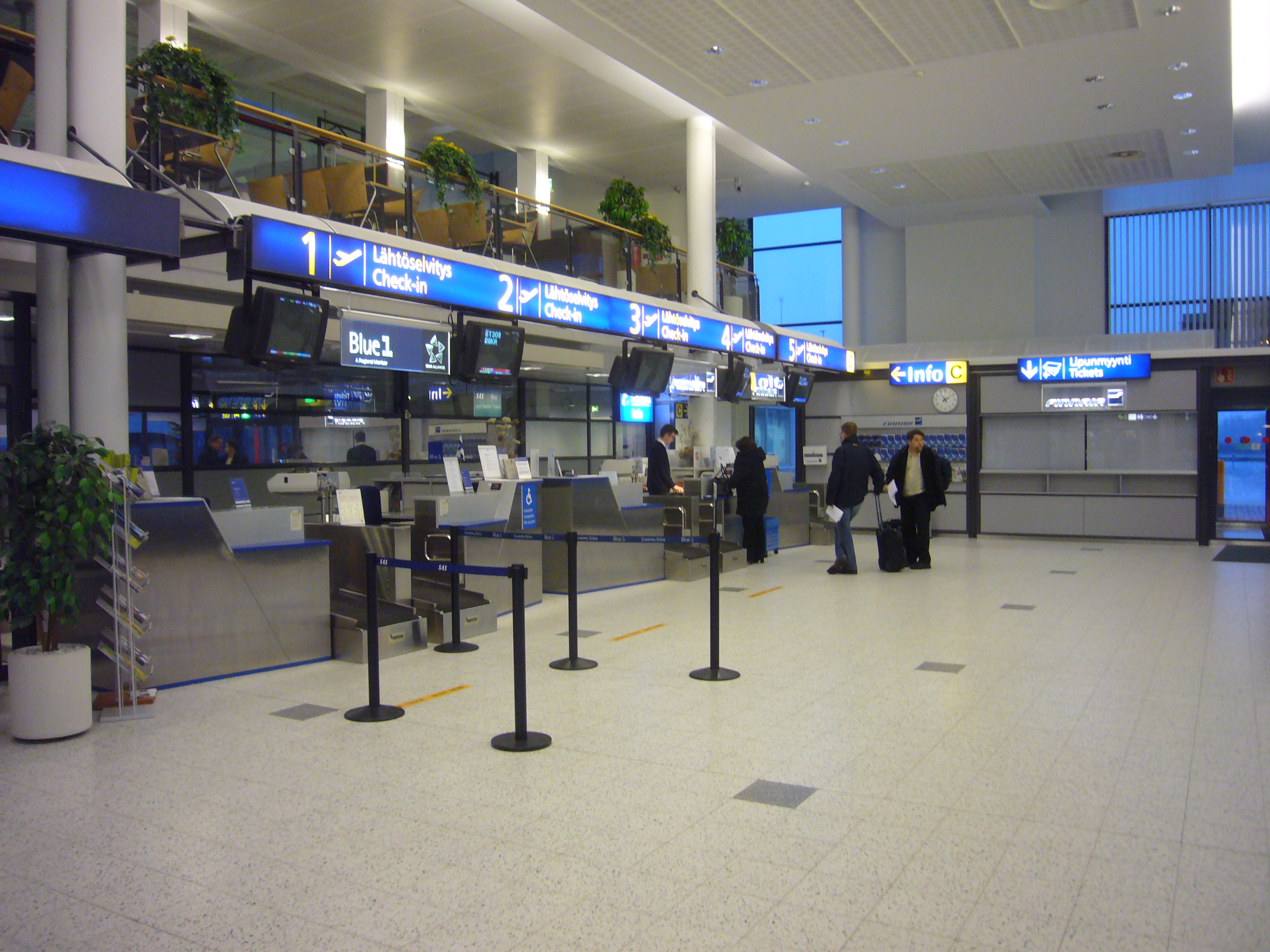
Check-in at Kuopio Airport

Airlines	Destinations
Aegean Airlines	Seasonal charter: Rhodes
Avion Express	Seasonal charter: Chania
Finnair	Helsinki
Freebird Airlines	Seasonal charter: Antalya
Pegasus Airlines	Seasonal charter: Antalya
Sunclass Airlines	Seasonal charter: Gran Canaria

== Statistics ==
Annual passenger statistics for Kuopio Airport
Year	Domestic passengers	International passengers	Total passengers	Change
2005	274,954	32,785	307,739	+6.5% ▲
2006	289,231	42,971	332,202	+7.9% ▲
2007	270,430	33,774	304,204	−8.4% ▼
2008	252,616	37,601	290,247	−4.6% ▼
2009	220,018	30,546	250,564	−13.7% ▼
2010	207,067	46,545	253,612	+1.2% ▲
2011	244,472	39,933	284,405	+12.1% ▲
2014	221,722	38,642	260,364	−0.3% ▼
2015	202,041	30,226	232,267	−10.8% ▼
2016	200,569	26,625	227,194	−2.2% ▼
2017	207,276	28,135	235,411	+3.6% ▲
2018	213,856	31,826	245,682	+4.4% ▲
2019	204,597	38,932	243,529	−0.9% ▼
2020	52,734	4,865	57,599	−76.3% ▼
2021	31,611	4,796	36,407	−36.8% ▼
2022	111,031	15,052	126,083	+246.3% ▲
2023	125,323	21,524	146,847	+16.5% ▲
2024	109,996	22,268	132,264	−9.9% ▼
2025	121,092	23,027	144,119	+9.0% ▲

== Finnish Air Force ==
Kuopio Airport is also home of the Finnish Air Force's Karelian Air Command and the Fighter Squadron 31 (HävLLv 31).

== Accidents and incidents ==
- On 3 October 1978, Douglas C-47A DO-10 of the Finnish Air Force crashed into Lake Juurusvesi when attempting to return to Kuopio Airport. The aircraft was on a military flight to Helsinki Airport when an engine failed shortly after take-off and the decision was made to return to Kuopio. 15 people died in the crash.

== Ground transportation ==
Means of transport at Kuopio Airport
Means of transport	Operator	Route	Destinations	Notes
Bus	Kuopio Public Transport	40	Market Square (Finnish: Kauppatori)	Every hour on weekdays
Taxi	Savon Taksidata	Airport Taxi	Kuopio	According to flight schedules

== See also ==
- List of the largest airports in the Nordic countries
