= Karelia Air Wing =

- Karjalan lennosto (Finnish); Karelens flygflottilj (Swedish)
- Distinctive unit insignia of the Karelia Air Wing
- Active: 1918–
- Country: Finland
- Branch: Finnish Air Force
- Size: 20-30 F-18 Hornet fighters 500 active duty personnel, 250 conscripts
- Garrison/HQ: Rissala, Kuopio Airport
- March: Sinivalkoinen marssi

Commanders
- Current commander: Colonel Johan Anttila

Insignia
- Flag

The Karelia Air Wing (Finnish: Karjalan lennosto, abbr. KarLsto; Swedish: Karelens flygflottilj) is the peace-time Finnish Air Force unit responsible for the protection of the airspace of eastern and southern parts of Finland. The headquarters of the air wing are located in Rissala, Siilinjärvi, near Kuopio Airport in the North Savo region.

The wing consists of some 20 F-18 Hornets, belonging to the No. 31 Sqn and six radar stations. The unit has about 600 personnel, of whom 450 are commissioned officers, NCOs and professional enlisted men and the other 150 are conscripts. The Headquarters no 7 is also located at the air force base.

The unit was created in 1918 as the Lento-Osasto II. During World War II it was to encompose the Fighter Squadrons 24, 26 and 28. The unit was moved to Rissala after the wars, and the fighter wing was divided between Flying Regiments 2 and 3. Flying Regiment 2, was later equipped with Fouga Magisters and MiG-21s. The unit flew MiG-21s from 1960 until 1998, when it received its F-18 Hornets.

In 2023 the English name for Karelia Air Command was changed to Karelia Air Wing along with the two other Air Commands.

== Fighter Squadron 31 ==
The Fighter Squadron 31 is the operational unit of the Karelia Air Wing. During Peace-time, its main duty is to guard its assigned air space, and if needed, to prevent unpermitted use of it. In order to be able to do so, it is equipped with some twenty F-18 Hornet fighters. The wing also operates an F-18 weapons training platform, called WTSAT or "Weapons Tactics and Situational Awareness Trainer".

In November 2018 it was announced that Lt Col Inka Niskanen would take charge of 31 Squadron as the first female commander of a Finnish fighter squadron, starting in 2019.

== Organization ==
Organization of Karelia Air Wing is:

- Headquarters
- 7th Control and Reporting Centre
- Fighter Squadron 31
- Aircraft Maintenance Squadron
- Communications Flight
- Logistics Flight
- Force Protection Squadron
