= Rovaniemi Airport =

Airport in Rovaniemi, Finland

Rovaniemi Airport Rovaniemen lentoasema

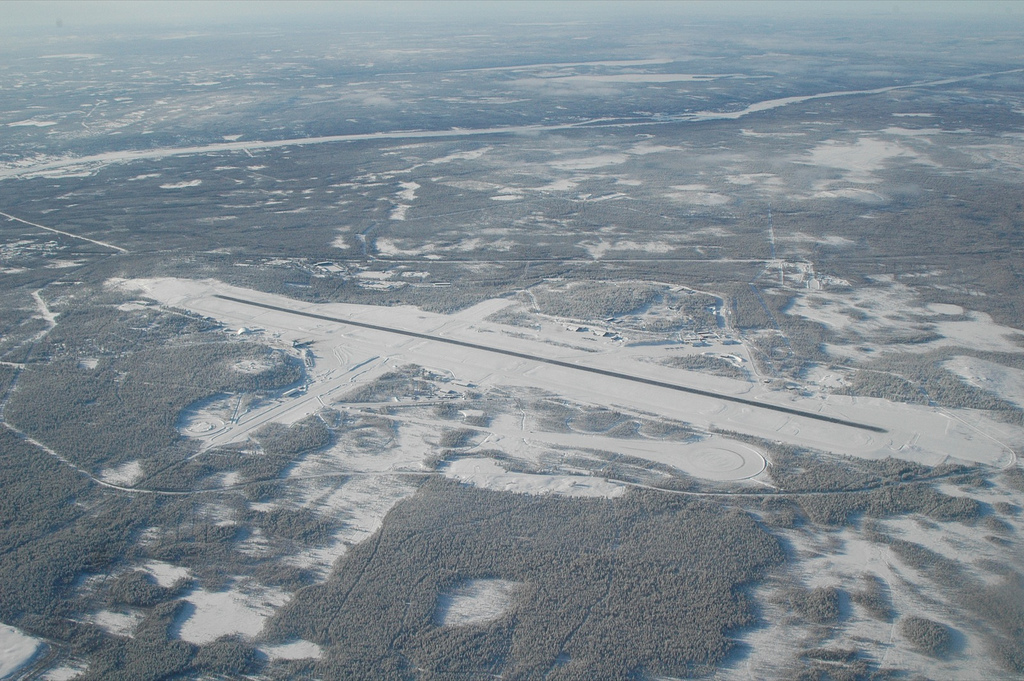
- IATA: RVN; ICAO: EFRO

Summary
- Airport type: Public / military
- Operator: Finavia
- Serves: Rovaniemi, Finland
- Elevation AMSL: 642 ft (196 m)
- Coordinates: 66°33′42″N 025°49′51″E
- Website: finavia.fi

Map
- Location within Finland

Runways
Direction	Length		Surface
Direction	m	ft	Surface
03/21	3,002	9,849	Asphalt

Statistics (2025)
- Passengers: 1,120,022
- Passenger change 24-25: ▲ +18.4%
- Aircraft movements: 9,456
- Source: AIP Finland

Rovaniemi Airport (Finnish: Rovaniemen lentoasema) (IATA: RVN, ICAO: EFRO) is an international airport serving Rovaniemi, Finland, approximately 10 kilometres (6 mi) north of Rovaniemi city centre. The Arctic Circle crosses the runway close to its northern end. It is the second busiest airport in Finland after Helsinki-Vantaa, as measured by the numbers of passengers and landings.

== History ==
=== Construction ===
Construction of Rovaniemi Airport began in 1939. Two grass-covered landing strips were completed in 1940. In June that year Aero O/Y, the predecessor of Finnair, began a scheduled route from Helsinki through Tampere, Vaasa, Kokkola, Oulu and Kemi to Rovaniemi, continuing north to Sodankylä and Petsamo. The airport pre-dated its German military use. It was built as part of Finland's developing civil aviation network rather than as a German wartime airfield. German military interest in Rovaniemi nevertheless preceded the German invasion of the Soviet Union. The Luftwaffe had established a communications station at Rovaniemi by late 1940. In June 1941, the Finnish Ministry of Defence and the German Luftgaustab Finnland agreed that the recently completed airfield would be placed at the disposal of German forces from 1 July. Although the formal agreements were not signed until April 1943, their provisions were applied retrospectively. Luftwaffe liaison personnel were already present at Rovaniemi air traffic control before Operation Barbarossa began on 22 June 1941.

Consequently, during the Second World War, the Airport developed from a newly constructed civilian airfield into the most important Luftwaffe air base in Finnish Lapland. While the airfield opened to civilian traffic in 1940, following increased Finnish–Nazi military cooperation it was placed at the disposal of German forces from 1 July 1941.

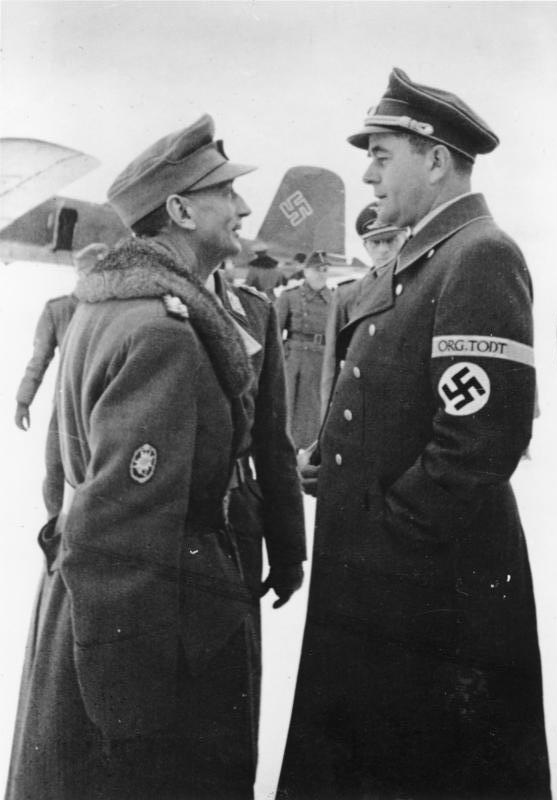
Albert Speer (wearing Organisation Todt armband) and Heer general Eduard Dietl at Rovaniemi Airport in Finland, December 1943

German aircraft began arriving before the formal transfer of the airfield. Aircraft of Aufklärungskette (F) Lappland, a long-range reconnaissance detachment commanded by Oberleutnant Konrad Knabe, arrived from Kirkenes and Banak in German-occupied Norway on 17–18 June 1941. The detachment included three Dornier Do 17 aircraft equipped for aerial reconnaissance, a Junkers Ju 52 transport, a Focke-Wulf aircraft and three Fieseler Fi 156 Storch liaison aircraft. They were followed by Messerschmitt Bf 109 fighters and aircraft of IV.(St.)/Lehrgeschwader 1, equipped with Junkers Ju 87 Stuka dive bombers. The airfield was placed under Kommando Flughafenbereich 27/III Rovaniemi, the German command responsible for the installation.

The Germans greatly enlarged the airfield and constructed hangars, barracks, workshops, aircraft dispersal areas, ammunition stores, anti-aircraft positions and other military infrastructure. By January 1943 at least 31 aircraft hangars, 120 accommodation and office barracks and 24 large storage or shed buildings had been recorded around the field. The original landing strips were enlarged and reconstructed with gravel and sand surfaces. The principal runway was approximately 1,300 metres (4,300 ft) long and a secondary runway approximately 850 metres (2,790 ft) long. Mikkonen gives the expanded wartime airfield area as approximately 1,165 hectares (2,880 acres).. Luftwaffe reconnaissance, fighter, dive-bomber, transport and training units operated from Rovaniemi during the Continuation War. When Finland ended its military cooperation with Germany in September 1944, the airfield became part of the theatre of the Lapland War. German forces began dismantling and destroying the base on 30 September, and the last German combat flying unit left on 11 October. Finnish troops subsequently cleared mines and unexploded ordnance and restored the field to limited operational use on 2 November 1944. Regular civilian air services resumed in 1948.

Around the airfield the Nazis constructed:

- aircraft hangars and open aircraft shelters;
- taxiways and dispersal areas;
- accommodation and administrative barracks;
- workshops and repair facilities;
- kitchens, dining halls and recreational buildings;
- ammunition and bomb-storage areas;
- anti-aircraft gun positions and defensive trenches; and
- supply and maintenance facilities.

Finnish civilians participated in the construction. Men and women from the nearby Saarenkylä area who were not serving at the front worked on forest clearance and earth-moving, while Finnish construction workers helped erect the first barrack camp.

The scale of the installation increased rapidly. During a visit by representatives of the Finnish liaison headquarters on 13 January 1943, at least 31 aircraft hangars were counted. The surrounding complex contained approximately 120 residential and office barracks and 24 larger storage and shed buildings. Food stocks were maintained for 2,000 people for four weeks, and the principal dining hall could accommodate 400 people at a time.

Mikkonen estimates that more than 200 structures of different kinds existed across the wider airfield area during its period of greatest activity in 1942–43.

During the German-controlled phase, the airfield was used exclusively by German forces. Mikkonen describes Rovaniemi as the Luftwaffe's most important base in Lapland, serving flying, anti-aircraft and air-observation units associated with Luftflotte 5.

Units based there at various times included:

- Aufklärungskette (F) Lappland, a reconnaissance unit;
- IV./Lehrgeschwader 1, subsequently redesignated within Sturzkampfgeschwader 5;
- I./Sturzkampfgeschwader 5;
- elements of I.(Z)/Jagdgeschwader 77;
- Ergänzungsstaffel I/Sturzkampfgeschwader 5, a replacement and training unit;
- 9./Sturzkampfgeschwader 151;
- Nachtschlachtgruppe 8; and
- several Luftwaffe anti-aircraft and support formations.

A Stuka replacement and training unit operated at Rovaniemi during 1942 and 1943. By 1942 much of the actual combat flying had shifted to airfields closer to the front, while Rovaniemi increasingly functioned as a major rear-area base for training, maintenance, transport and command functions.

Aircraft types associated with the wartime base included the Junkers Ju 87, Junkers Ju 88, Messerschmitt Bf 109, Focke-Wulf Fw 190, Dornier Do 17, Junkers Ju 52, Fieseler Storch and other reconnaissance and transport aircraft.

Rovaniemi was also connected by regular Luftwaffe transport flights with Oslo, while flights to Berlin operated when required.

=== Labour and prisoners of war ===
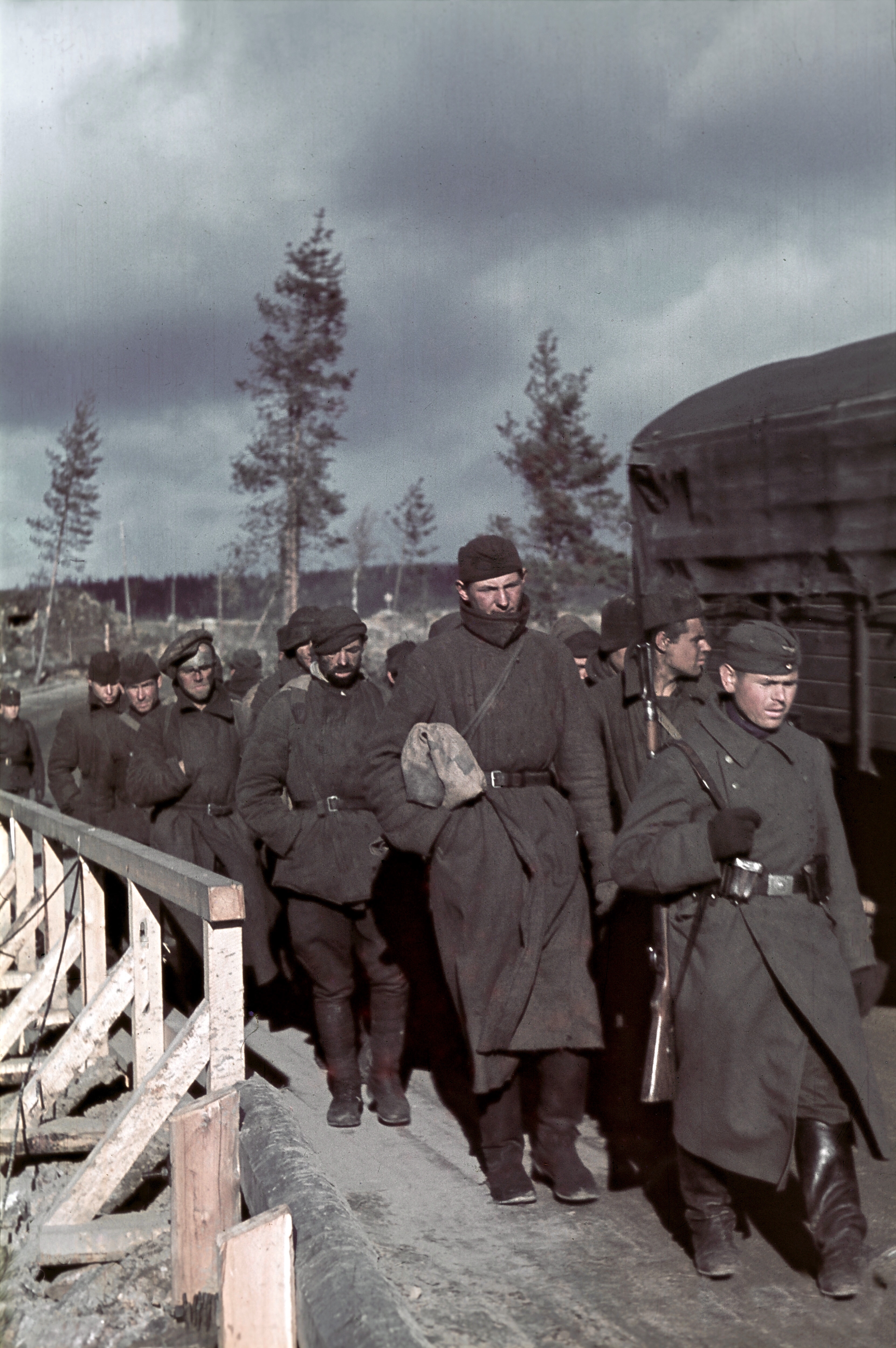
Soviet prisoners used as labourers in 1941 under German guard in Finland

Expansion and operation of the Nazi airfield relied on a mixture of German military personnel, paid Finnish civilian labour, foreign labour-service personnel and prisoners of war.

A Finnish liaison report dated 14 January 1943 recorded that the Germans had approximately 500 prisoners of war available for work in the Rovaniemi airfield area, together with 30–40 Dutch labour-service personnel and 70 paid Finnish employees of the Finnish road and water-construction administration.

A small prisoner-of-war camp of two or three barracks surrounded by barbed wire stood beside the road passing the airfield. A second camp, containing four barracks according to a wartime German plan, was located approximately one kilometre north of the field.

Prisoners were also used in work supporting the operation of the base. The airfield required substantial quantities of firewood for heating, and Russian prisoners of war were employed in logging areas at Poikajärvi and Norvajärvi from which timber was supplied to the airfield.

The use of prisoners formed part of a wider German labour system in northern Finland. As the supply of paid Finnish workers declined, German forces increasingly relied on Organisation Todt labour, workers imported from German-occupied countries and prisoner labour for construction, transport, forestry and other military work.

=== Soviet air attacks and air defence ===
Soviet aircraft attacked Rovaniemi and its airfield during the opening days of the Continuation War. The airfield was bombed on 25 June 1941, and bomb craters from the attack remained identifiable at the western edge of the airfield decades later.

Subsequent Soviet bombing of Rovaniemi was comparatively infrequent. Mikkonen attributes this in part to the presence of German fighter aircraft and strong anti-aircraft defences around the town and airfield.

The German air-defence network included Freya early-warning radar and Würzburg D fire-control radar. Anti-aircraft positions around the airfield included both 88 mm (3.5 in) and 37 mm (1.5 in) guns, supplemented by machine-gun positions intended to defend against low-level attack.

=== Operational history ===
Services were first operated by Aero O/Y. On 21.6.1940 Aero O/Y started operations of the "Lapland Express"-flight route from Helsinki to Petsamo via Tampere, Vaasa, Kokkola, Oulu, Kemi, Rovaniemi and Sodankylä. The route was operated by Junkers Ju 52/3m-aircraft, with a travel time of 8.5 hours. The runway was extended to the length of 3002m in 1981.

In 2020s, the airport has seen a major increase in passengers following a rise in Lapland tourism, with passenger numbers rising by 31.1% from 2023 to 2024 and 29% from 2024 to 2025. Citing increased tourist traffic in Rovaniemi Airport Finavia announced plans to expand the airport terminal by "nearly 1000 square meters" in April 2025. The extension increased the landside area of the terminal at a cost of €3 million and was completed on October 28th, 2025.

== Facilities ==
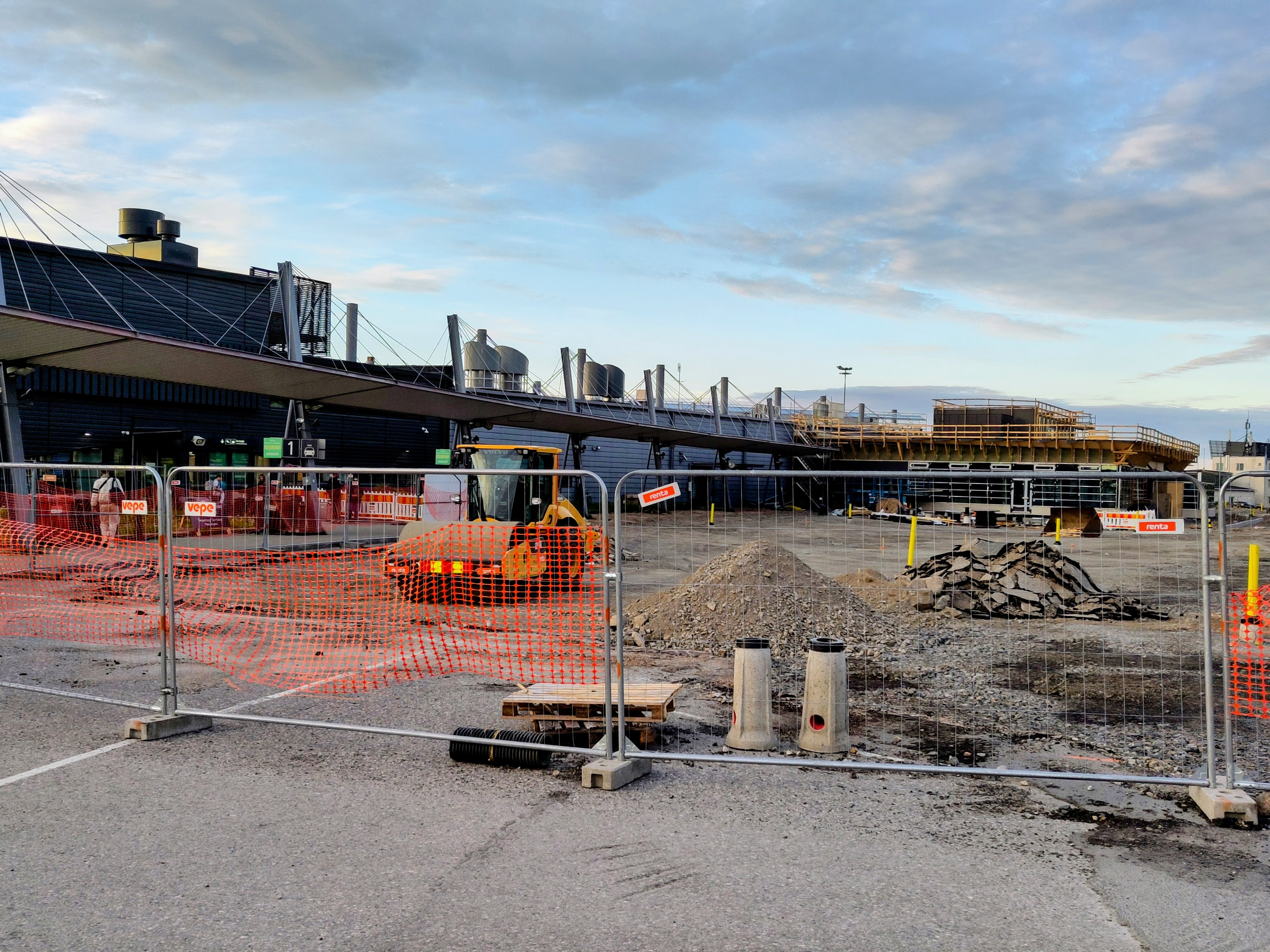
Construction during the 2025 terminal expansion

Rovaniemi Airport is one of three airports in Finland that have jet bridges (the other two are Helsinki-Vantaa Airport and Oulu Airport). The airport is managed by Finavia. It is connected to Rovaniemi city centre by an airport bus, and there are also multiple bus connections around Lapland, including to major winter sports centers.

Rovaniemi Airport is the second-busiest airport in Finland after Helsinki airport. Santa Claus Village and Santa Park are within 2–3 kilometres (1.2–1.9 mi). The airport is about 8–9 kilometres (5.0–5.6 mi) away from Rovaniemi city centre, so that many restaurants and hotels are nearby. The busiest time for the airport is in the Christmas season, when many people go on Santa Flights. In April 2025, Finavia announced plans to expand the airport by approximately €3 million because of the constantly growing tourism to Lapland; the expansion work was completed in October of the same year.

In addition to civil traffic, the runway is also used by F-18 fighter interceptors of Lapin lennosto (Lapland Air Wing). The Rovaniemen vartiolentue (Finnish Border Guard Air Patrol Squadron) is also located nearby.

== Airlines and destinations ==
The following airlines operate regular scheduled and charter flights at Rovaniemi Airport:

Airlines	Destinations
Air France	Seasonal: Paris–Charles de Gaulle
Austrian Airlines	Seasonal: Vienna
British Airways	Seasonal: London–Gatwick (begins 4 December 2026)
easyJet	Seasonal: Amsterdam, Belfast–International, Berlin, Birmingham, Bordeaux, Bristol, Edinburgh, Geneva, London–Gatwick, London–Luton, London–Southend, Lyon, Manchester, Milan–Malpensa, Naples, Nice, Paris–Charles de Gaulle
Edelweiss Air	Seasonal: Zurich
Eurowings	Seasonal: Berlin, Düsseldorf, Hamburg, Stuttgart
Finnair	Helsinki, Tromsø
Iberia	Seasonal: Madrid
Israir Airlines	Seasonal: Tel Aviv
Jet2.com	Seasonal charter: Manchester
KLM	Seasonal: Amsterdam
LOT Polish Airlines	Seasonal: Warsaw–Chopin
Lufthansa	Seasonal: Frankfurt, Munich (begins 4 December 2026)
Luxair	Seasonal: Luxembourg
Neos	Seasonal: Milan–Malpensa, Rome–Fiumicino
Norwegian Air Shuttle	Helsinki; Seasonal: Barcelona, London–Gatwick, Munich Tromsø
Ryanair	Milan-Bergamo; Seasonal: Birmingham, Bristol, Brussels-Charleroi, Dublin, Liverpool, London–Stansted, Manchester, Paris-Beauvais, Shannon
Scandinavian Airlines	Seasonal: Copenhagen
SunExpress	Seasonal: İzmir
Transavia	Seasonal: Paris–Orly
TUI Airways	Seasonal: Birmingham, Bristol, London–Gatwick, Manchester, Newcastle upon Tyne
Turkish Airlines	Seasonal: Istanbul
Vueling	Seasonal: Barcelona

== Statistics ==
In 2025, the airport served about 1.1 million passengers. The main season of charter traffic from the United Kingdom and many other European countries lasts from the end of November until the middle of January annually.

Annual passenger statistics for Rovaniemi Airport
Year	Domestic passengers	%change	International passengers	% change	Total passengers	% change
1998	286,548	0	41,104	0	327,652	0
1999	294,110	2.6 ▲	52,316	27.3 ▲	346,426	5.7 ▲
2000	288,343	-2.0 ▼	55,790	6.6 ▲	344,133	-0.7 ▼
2001	280,407	-2.8 ▼	71,637	28.4 ▲	352,044	2.3 ▲
2002	257,043	-8.3 ▼	83,061	15.9 ▲	340,104	-3.4 ▼
2003	277,859	8.1 ▲	87,039	4.8 ▲	364,898	7.3 ▲
2004	289,145	4.1 ▲	105,405	21.1 ▲	394,550	8.1 ▲
2005	295,205	2.1 ▲	89,317	-15.3 ▼	384,522	-2.5 ▼
2006	330,910	12.1 ▲	101,372	13.5 ▲	432,282	12.4 ▲
2007	348,275	5.2 ▲	101,661	0.3 ▲	449,936	4.1 ▲
2008	308,870	-11.3 ▼	91,697	-9.8 ▼	400,567	-11.0 ▼
2009	245,963	-20.4 ▼	63,642	-30.6 ▼	309,605	-22.7 ▼
2010	246,464	0.2 ▲	63,244	-0.6 ▼	309,708	0.0
2011	329,990	33.9 ▲	66,835	5.7 ▲	396,825	28.1 ▲
2012	345,763	4.8 ▲	58,129	-13.0 ▼	403,892	1.8 ▲
2013	363,670	5.2 ▲	63,697	9.6 ▲	427,367	5.8 ▲
2014	376,183	3.4 ▲	68,378	7.3 ▲	444,561	4.0 ▲
2015	404,712	7.6 ▲	73,635	7.7 ▲	478,347	7.6 ▲
2016	397,799	-1.7 ▼	90,058	22.3 ▲	487,857	2.0 ▲
2017	455,589	14.5 ▲	123,881	37.6 ▲	579,470	18.8 ▲
2018	512,033	12.4 ▲	132,111	6.6 ▲	644,144	11.2 ▲
2019	540,467	5.6 ▲	120,657	-8.7 ▼	661,124	2.6 ▲
2020	219,259	-59.4 ▼	48,863	-59.5 ▼	268,122	-59.4 ▼
2021	198,119	-9.6 ▼	56,771	16.2 ▲	254,890	-4.9 ▼
2022	401,694	102.8 ▲	159,040	180.1 ▲	560,734	120.0 ▲
2023	454,775	13.2 ▲	280,303	76.2 ▲	735,078	31.1 ▲
2024	527,773	16.0 ▲	420,418	50.0 ▲	948,151	29.0 ▲
2025	516,184	-2.2 ▼	603,838	44.3 ▲	1,120,022	18.4 ▲

== See also ==
- List of the largest airports in the Nordic countries
