= No. 11 Squadron (Finland) =

Finnish Air Force fighter squadron

Fighter Squadron 11 (Hävittäjälentolaivue 11, HävLLv 11) is a Finnish fighter squadron located in Rovaniemi, Lapland. It is the operational part of the Lapland Wing.

Through January 2025 - February 2025 Fighter Squadron 11 deployed to the Icelandic Air Policing mission with 4 x F/A-18 Hornets and 50 personnel. This was Finland's first NATO Air Policing Mission in Iceland.

== Organization ==
1st Flight
Fighter flight, flies F-18C/D and also trains mechanics
2nd Flight
Fighter flight, flies F-18C/D and trains pilots
4th Flight
Liaison flight, flies Valmet Vinka, PA-31-350 Chieftain, Valmet L-90TP Redigo aircraft

== Sources ==
- www.ilmavoimat.fi
