= No. 28 Squadron (Finland) =

- Lentolaivue 28
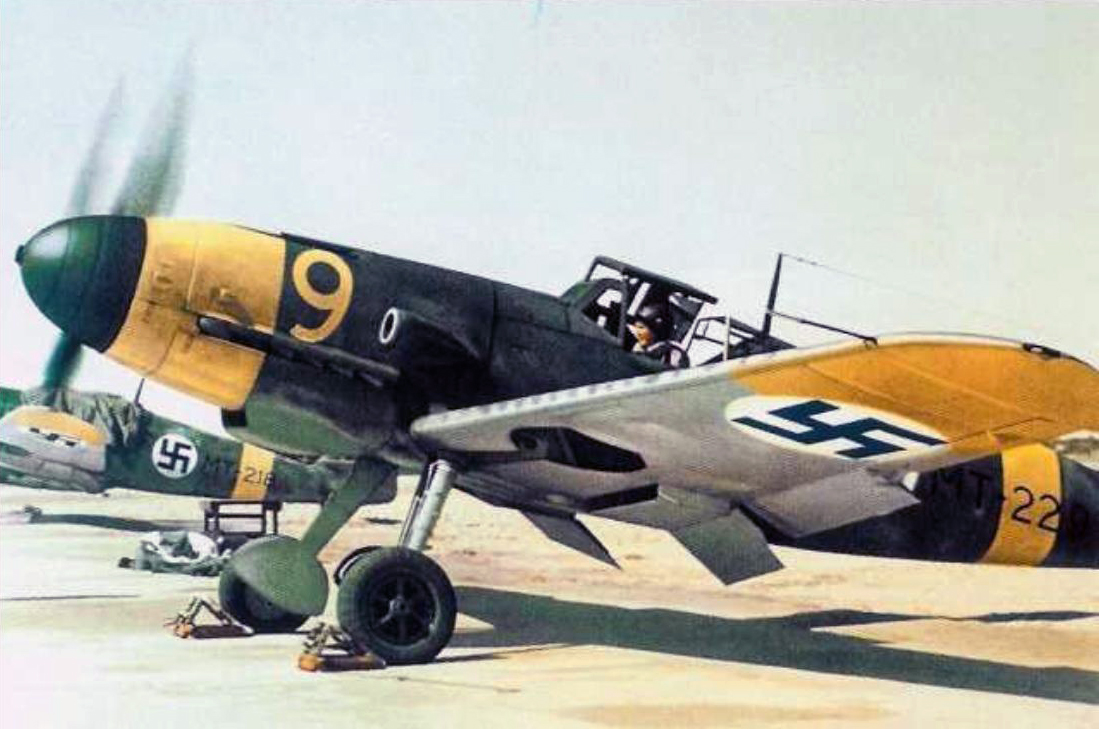
- Active: 8 December 1939 – 15 September 1948
- Country: Finland
- Branch: Finnish Air Force
- Type: Fighter squadron
- Role: Fighter operations
- Part of: Flying Regiment 2

No. 28 Squadron (Finnish: Lentolaivue 28 or LLv.28, from 3 May 1942 Le.Lv.28, and from 14 February 1944 No. 28 Fighter Squadron (Hävittäjälentolaivue 28, HLeLv 28)) was a fighter squadron of the Finnish Air Force during World War II. A unit of Flying Regiment 2, it was established on 8 December 1939 and participated in the Winter War, Continuation War and Lapland War. The squadron was disbanded on 15 September 1948 following the military restrictions imposed on Finland after the war.

== History ==
=== Formation and Winter War ===
Following the outbreak of the Winter War, France donated 50 Morane-Saulnier M.S.406 fighters to Finland, of which approximately 30 were delivered. To operate these aircraft, No. 28 Squadron was established within Flying Regiment 2, with Major Niilo Jusu appointed as commander. The squadron became operational in February 1940 and was based at Säkylä, with detachments also operating from Turku, Utti and Hollola. During the Winter War, it flew 288 sorties, including interception, reconnaissance and ground-attack missions. The Morane fighters proved effective in Finnish service, particularly due to their maneuverability. During 22 days of combat, the squadron engaged in 28 aerial combats, achieving 14 aerial victories while losing only one aircraft to anti-aircraft fire.

=== Continuation War ===
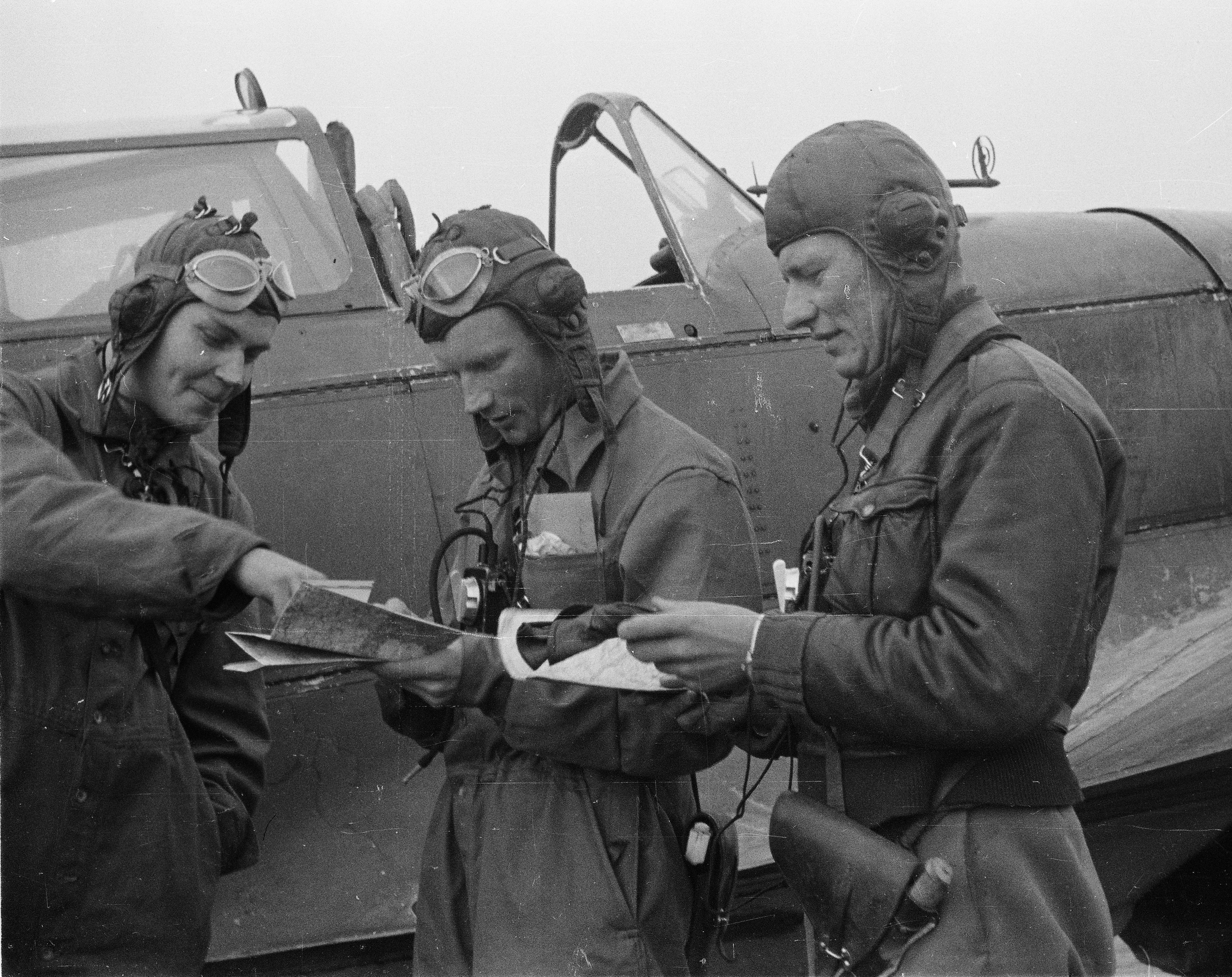
Pilots from 28th Squadron in October 1942

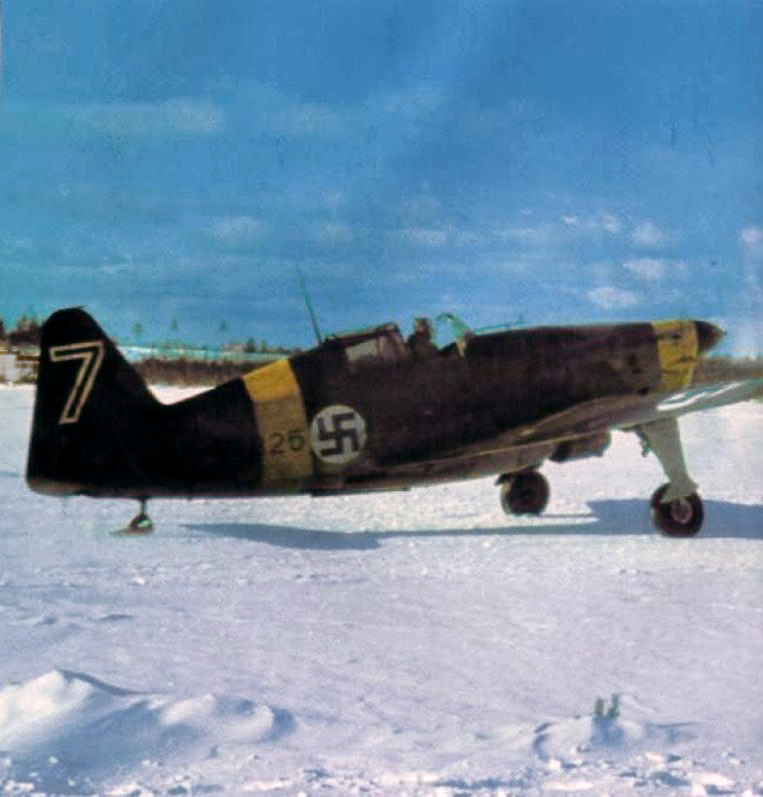
Morane-Saulnier M.S. 406

During the interim peace, the squadron moved to Naarajärvi. At the outbreak of the Continuation War on 25 June 1941, it was commanded by Captain Sven-Erik Sirén. On 4 July 1941, the squadron moved to Joroinen to support Finnish ground operations. As the front advanced, it operated from several forward airfields, including Karkunranta, Viitana and Hirvas. In 1941, the squadron achieved its highest combat effectiveness. Although the Morane-Saulnier fighters were already technically outdated, they performed well due to experienced pilots, tactical advantages and good maneuverability. However, as the war progressed, the limitations of the Morane fighters became increasingly apparent. The aircraft suffered from relatively low engine power, limited climb performance and weak armament compared to newer Soviet fighters. By 1942, this reduced the squadron’s combat effectiveness, and losses increased accordingly. The squadron’s 2nd Flight was temporarily disbanded in July 1942 due to aircraft losses and later reactivated after additional aircraft became available.

=== Mörkö-Morane development ===
To address the shortcomings of the Morane fighters, a modification program resulted in the Mörkö-Morane (MSv), equipped with a Soviet Klimov M-105 engine. This significantly improved speed, climb rate and performance. Only a small number of these aircraft were available before the end of the Continuation War, and their operational impact remained limited.

=== Late war and Bf 109 introduction ===
On 14 February 1944, the squadron was redesignated No. 28 Fighter Squadron. Following the intensification of fighting in 1944, the squadron began receiving more modern aircraft. The first Messerschmitt Bf 109 was received on 1 July 1944, with additional aircraft delivered during the summer. These were mainly assigned to the 2nd and 3rd Flights, while Morane aircraft were concentrated in the 1st Flight. On 9 August 1944, the squadron achieved its final aerial victory, which was also the last confirmed aerial victory of the Finnish Air Force in the Continuation War. During the Continuation War, the squadron achieved 121 aerial victories while losing 27 aircraft and 17 aircrew.

=== Lapland War ===
After the armistice, the squadron moved to Onttola and later to Vaala and Kemi, conducting reconnaissance and escort missions against German forces. Air combat during this phase was limited, and operations were primarily focused on patrol and support tasks. The squadron flew its final wartime sortie on 13 October 1944.

=== Post-war period ===
After the war, the squadron was redesignated No. 21 Fighter Squadron and based at Rissala. Its Morane aircraft were converted into MSv variants and used mainly for training. Operational activity declined due to shortages of spare parts and the obsolescence of the aircraft. By 1947, only a small number remained operational. Following the restrictions imposed by the Paris Peace Treaty, the squadron was disbanded on 15 September 1948.

== Organization ==
=== Winter War ===
- 1st Flight (1. Lentue) – Detachment Sirén
- 2nd Flight (2. Lentue) – Detachment Turkki
- 3rd Flight (3. Lentue) – Detachment Jutila / Räty

=== Continuation War ===
- 1st Flight (1. Lentue)
- 2nd Flight (2. Lentue)
- 3rd Flight (3. Lentue)

== Aircraft ==
The squadron operated the following aircraft:

- Morane-Saulnier M.S.406
- Morane-Saulnier M.S.410
- Mörkö-Morane
- Messerschmitt Bf 109

== Combat record ==
The squadron’s combat performance varied significantly over time:

- Winter War:
  - 14 aerial victories
  - 1 aircraft lost
- Continuation War:
  - 121 aerial victories
  - 27 aircraft lost
  - 17 aircrew killed

Combat effectiveness peaked in 1941 and declined as the Morane aircraft became obsolete, before improving slightly with the introduction of more modern aircraft in 1944.

== Sources ==
- Keskinen, Kalevi; Partonen, Kyösti; Stenman, Kari. Suomen ilmavoimat 1928–40. Espoo, 2006.
- Keskinen, Kalevi; Stenman, Kari. Suomen ilmavoimien historia 17 – Lentorykmentti 2. Espoo, 2001.
- Keskinen, Kalevi; Stenman, Kari. Ilmavoimat sodan jälkeen. Tampere, 1999.
- Keskinen, Kalevi; Stenman, Kari; Niska, Klaus. Messerschmitt Bf 109 G. Helsinki, 1976.
- Raunio, Jukka. Lentäjän näkökulma II. 1993.
