= No. 31 Squadron (Finland) =

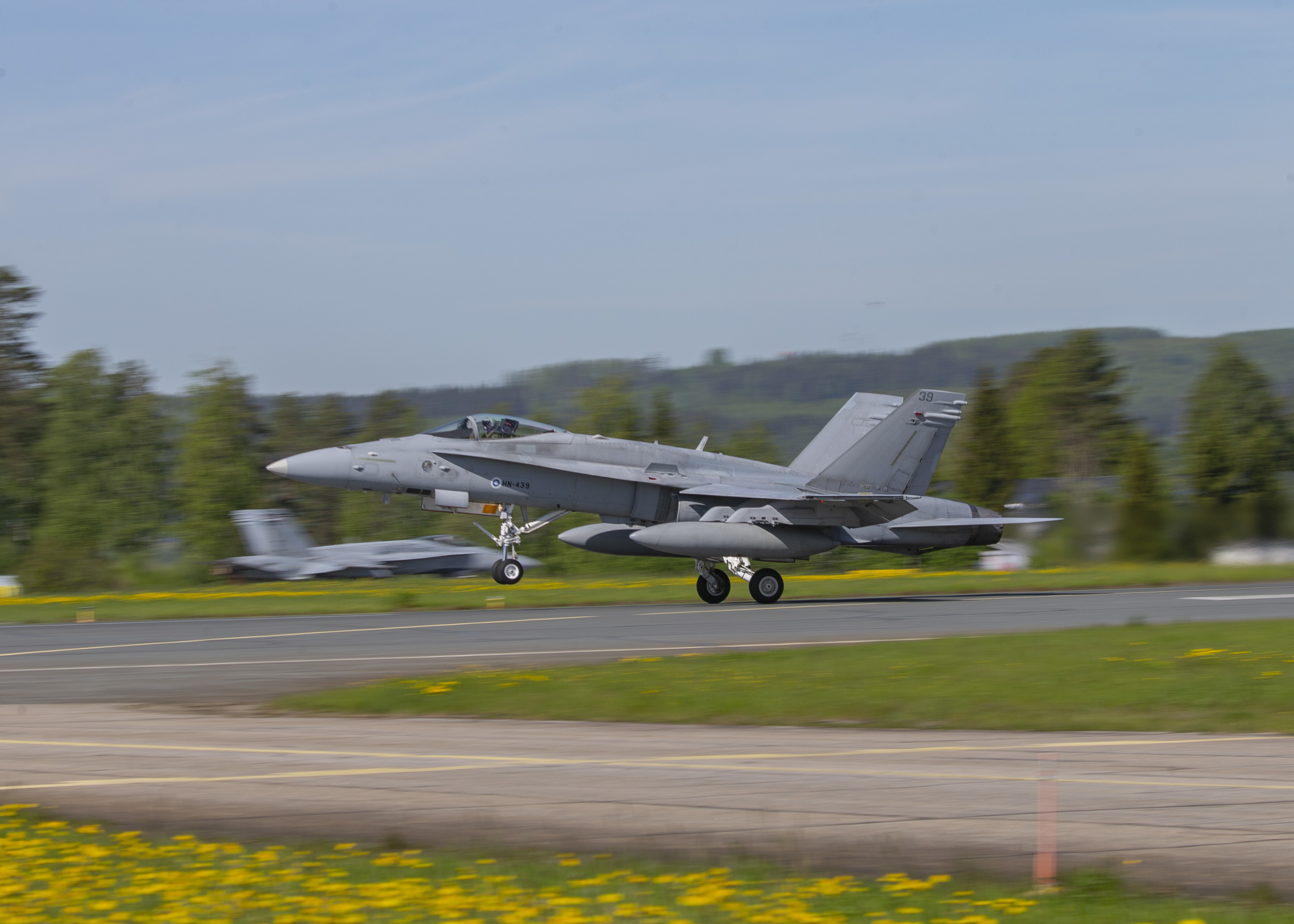
A Finnish Air Force F/A-18C Hornet from Fighter Squadron 31 at Rissala Air Base, Finland

Fighter Squadron 31 (Hävittäjälentolaivue 31, HävLLv 31) is a Finnish fighter squadron located in Rissala, near Kuopio. It is the operational part of the Karelia Wing. Fighter aircraft of the squadron are the F-18C/D.

== Organization ==
Organization of the squadron is:
- Headquarters flight
- 1st Fighter Flight
- 2nd Fighter Flight
- 3rd Fighter Flight
