= Lapland Air Wing =

- Lapin Lennosto (Finnish); Lapplands flygflottilj (Swedish)
- Distinctive unit insignia of the Lapland Air Wing
- Active: 1974–
- Country: Finland
- Branch: Finnish Air Force
- Size: 420
- Garrison/HQ: Rovaniemi, Rovaniemi Airport
- March: Hanssin Jukka

Commanders
- Current commander: Colonel Saku Joukas

Insignia
- Flag

The Lapland Air Wing (Finnish: Lapin Lennosto, abbr. LapLsto; Swedish: Lapplands flygflottilj) is the peace-time Finnish Air Force unit responsible for the protection of the airspace of northern Finland. The headquarters of the air wing is located in the present-day province of Lapland, at Rovaniemi Airport.

The Lapland Air Command was founded in 1973, when the Tavastia Air Command was moved to Rovaniemi. The unit was officially renamed into the Lapland Air Command in 1974. It was equipped with Saab Draken fighters. The wing was established due to the increased importance of airspace in Cold War Europe. The Soviet Navy had large installations on the Kola Peninsula, while NATO had a large number of aircraft in northern Norway. Both sides often held large wargames nearby.

In the early 2000s, the wing was equipped with F-18 Hornet fighters, the first were received in January 1999, and operative readiness was obtained in 2000. At the same time, all Drakens were retired.

The Wing's main duty is to guard and defend the air space, as well as to support the land forces. The wing trains conscripts for aerial surveillance, and for general service and support for the fighter flights. The Lapland Air Defence Battalion is also located at the base.

The Fighter Squadron 11 is the operational unit of the Lapland Air Wing.

In 2023 the English name for Lapland Air Command was changed to Lapland Air Wing along with the two other Air Commands.

== Organization ==
- Headquarters
- 5th Control and Reporting Centre
- Fighter Squadron 11
- Aircraft Maintenance Squadron
- Communications Flight
- Logistics Flight
