= Santa Claus Village =

Amusement park in Rovaniemi, Finland

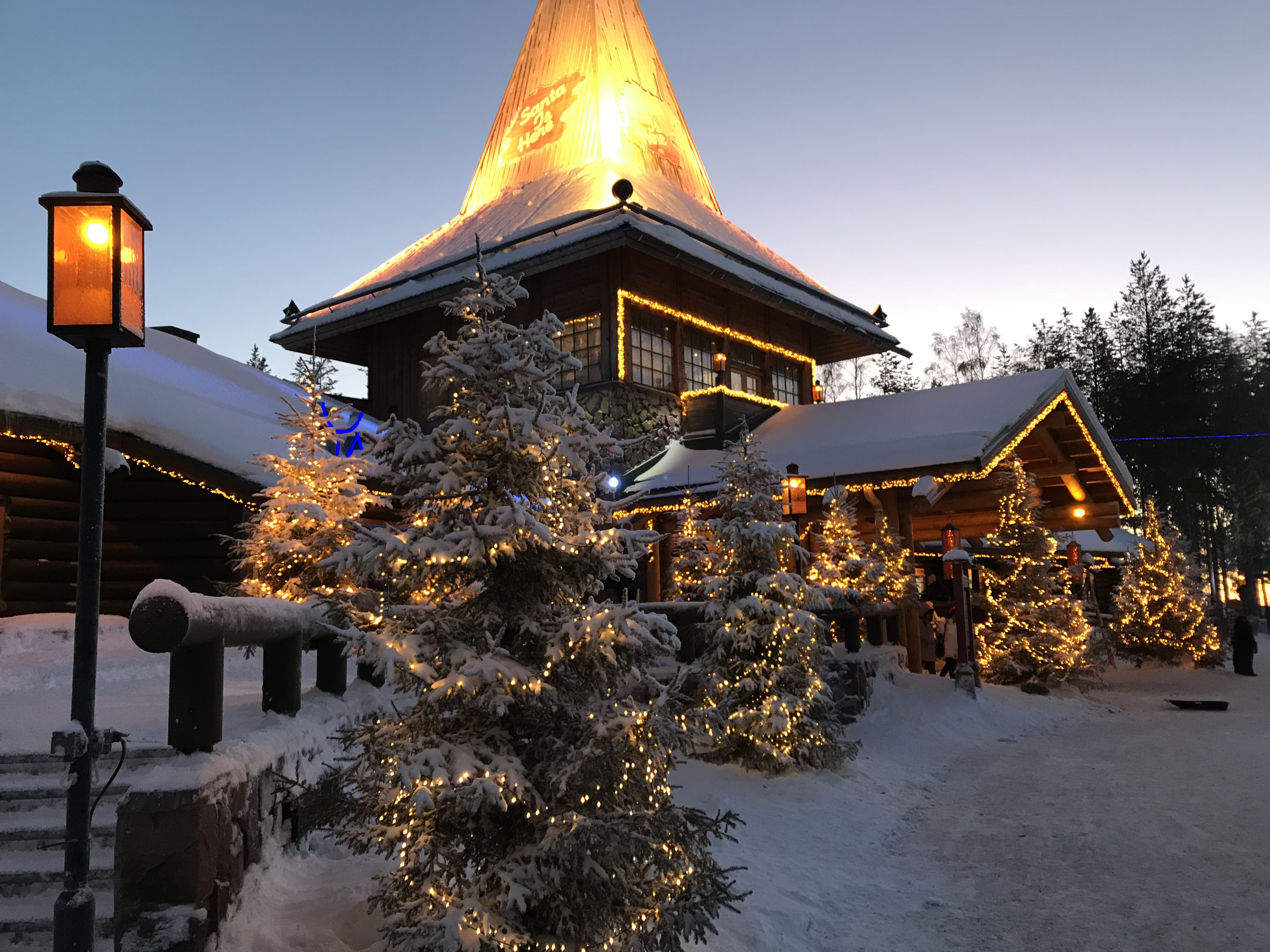
- Santa Claus's office
- Interactive map of Santa Claus Village
- Location: Rovaniemi, Finland
- Coordinates: 66°32′36″N 25°50′51″E
- Status: Operating
- Opened: January 1980; 46 years ago
- Owner: Dianordia Oy
- Website: https://santaclausvillage.info/

Santa Claus Village (Finnish: Joulupukin Pajakylä; Northern Sami: Juovlamánnu gili) is an amusement park in Rovaniemi, a city in the Lapland region of Finland. It was opened in 1980.

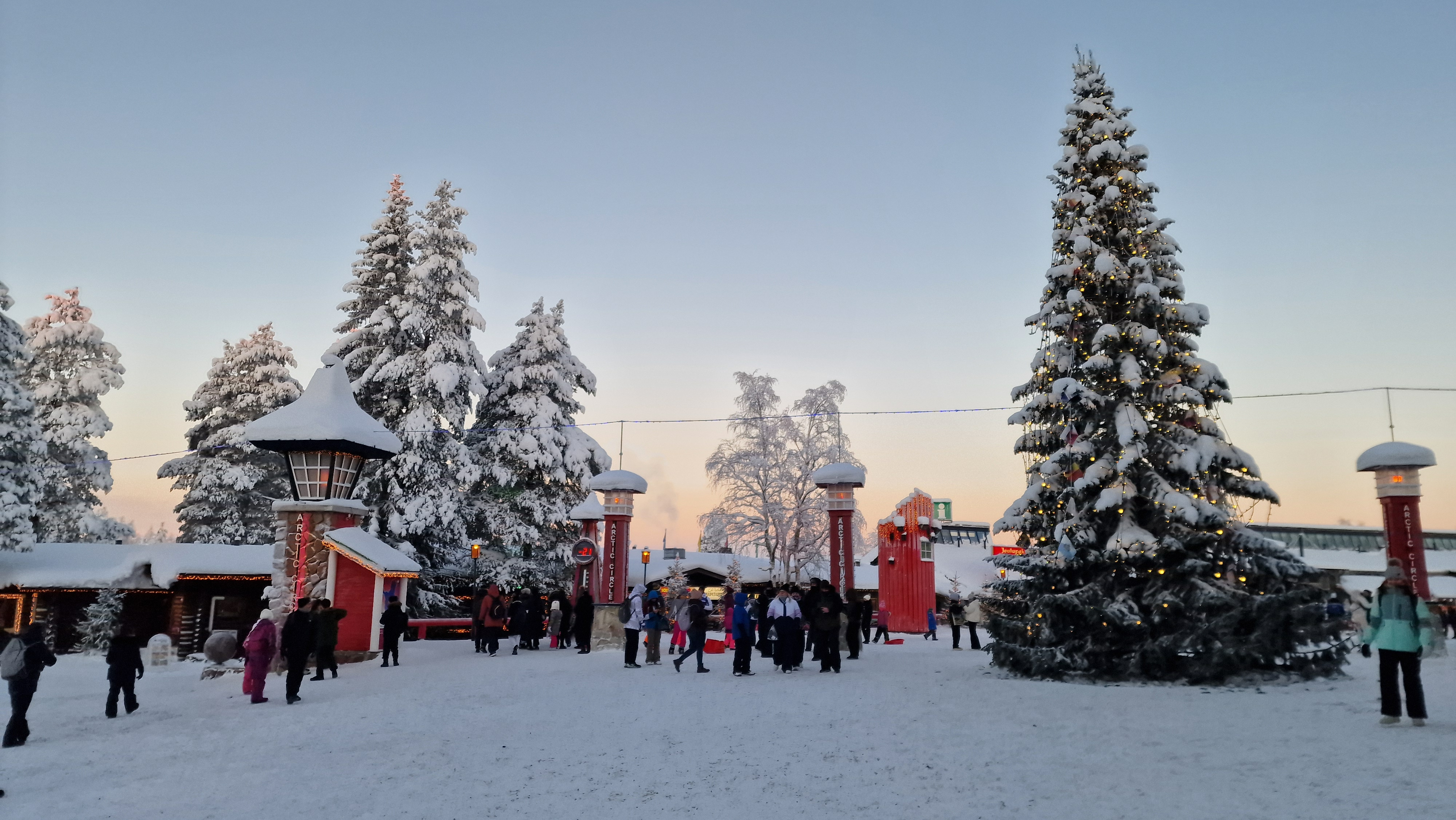
Santa Claus Village

== History ==
The area occupied by the present-day Santa Claus Village formed part of a large German Luftwaffe base during the Continuation War. German forces greatly expanded the nearby Rovaniemi Airport after taking control of the airfield in 1941, constructing an extensive support complex of barracks, workshops, stores and other military installations which extended to the present-day Arctic Circle tourist area.

Archaeologist Oula Seitsonen has described Santa Claus Village as having been established "on top of a German Luftwaffe base". Archaeological remains of German barracks were still visible immediately behind the tourist buildings in the 2010s, although some were subsequently covered or destroyed as the village expanded.

The surviving structures should not be confused with the later tourist development. German forces destroyed most of their buildings around Rovaniemi during their withdrawal in October 1944.

The last building to be built in the Arctic Circle in Rovaniemi was the Roosevelt Lodge, which was built in the 1950s for a visit by Eleanor Roosevelt, the wife of the late US-President, Franklin D. Roosevelt.

The first original home of Santa Claus was Korvatunturi, built as the "Finnish equivalent of Disneyland". In 1980, Rovaniemi was declared as an official hometown of Santa Claus.

There was an association called Joulumaa, founded 1989 in Rovaniemi, consisting of 34 companies. The association was closed in 1992 due to financial difficulties as Joulumaa could no longer afford to continue the letter service, answering letters received by Santa Claus.

== Location and transportation ==
Santa Claus Village is located about 8 kilometres (5 mi) northeast of Rovaniemi and about 2 kilometres (1.2 mi) from the Rovaniemi Airport.

== Attractions ==
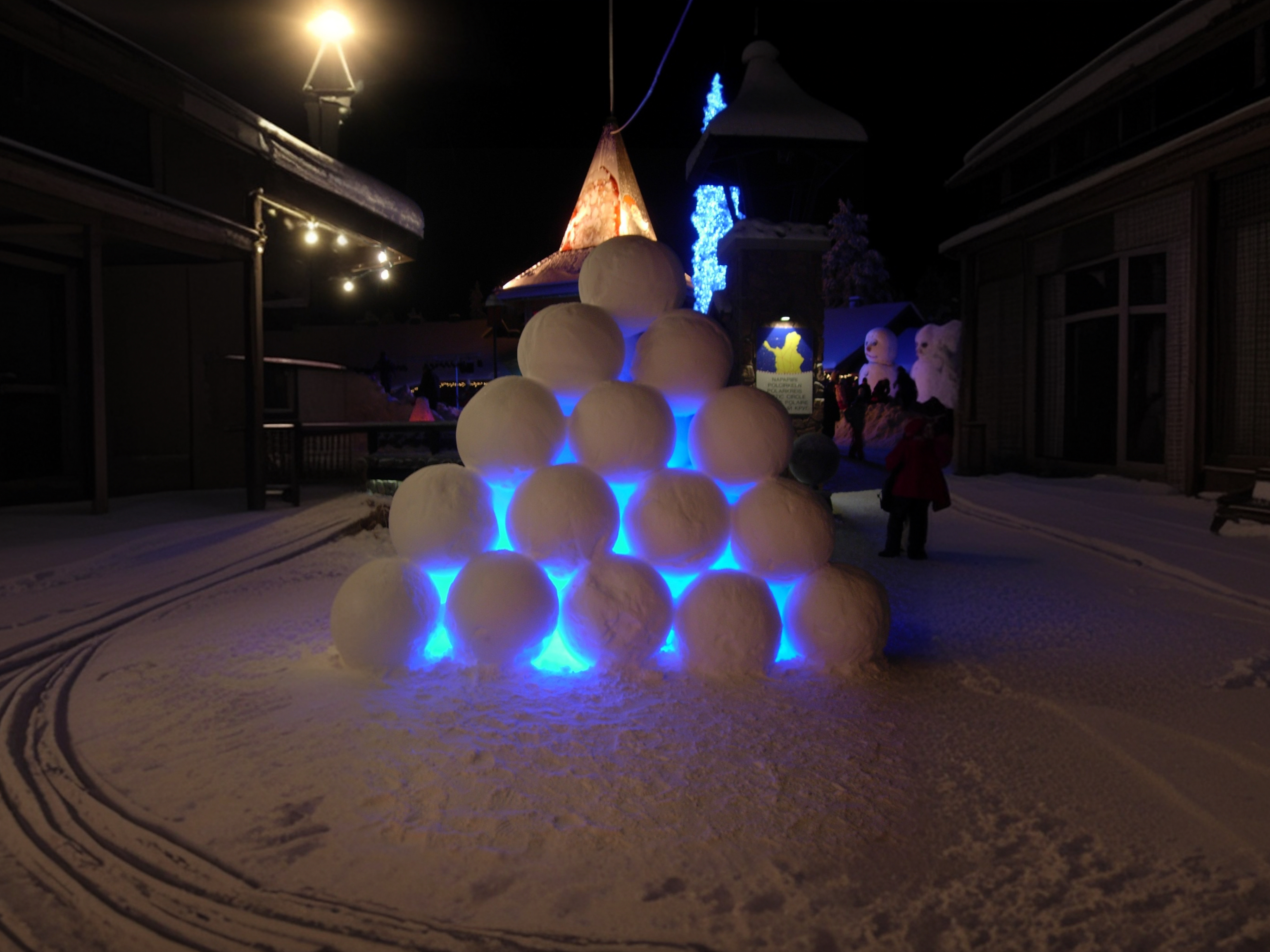
Snowball pyramid at Santa Claus Village

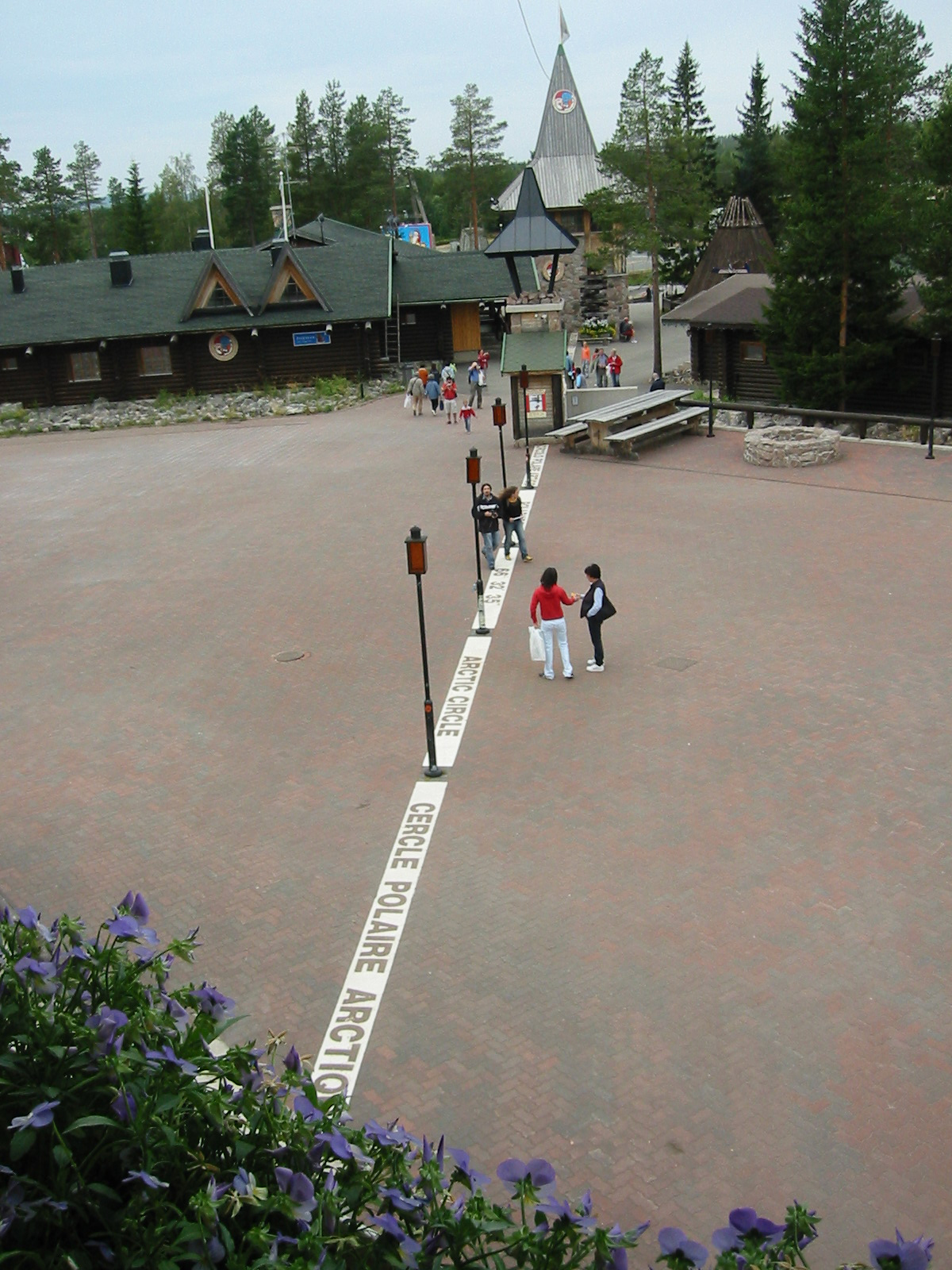
The Arctic Circle line

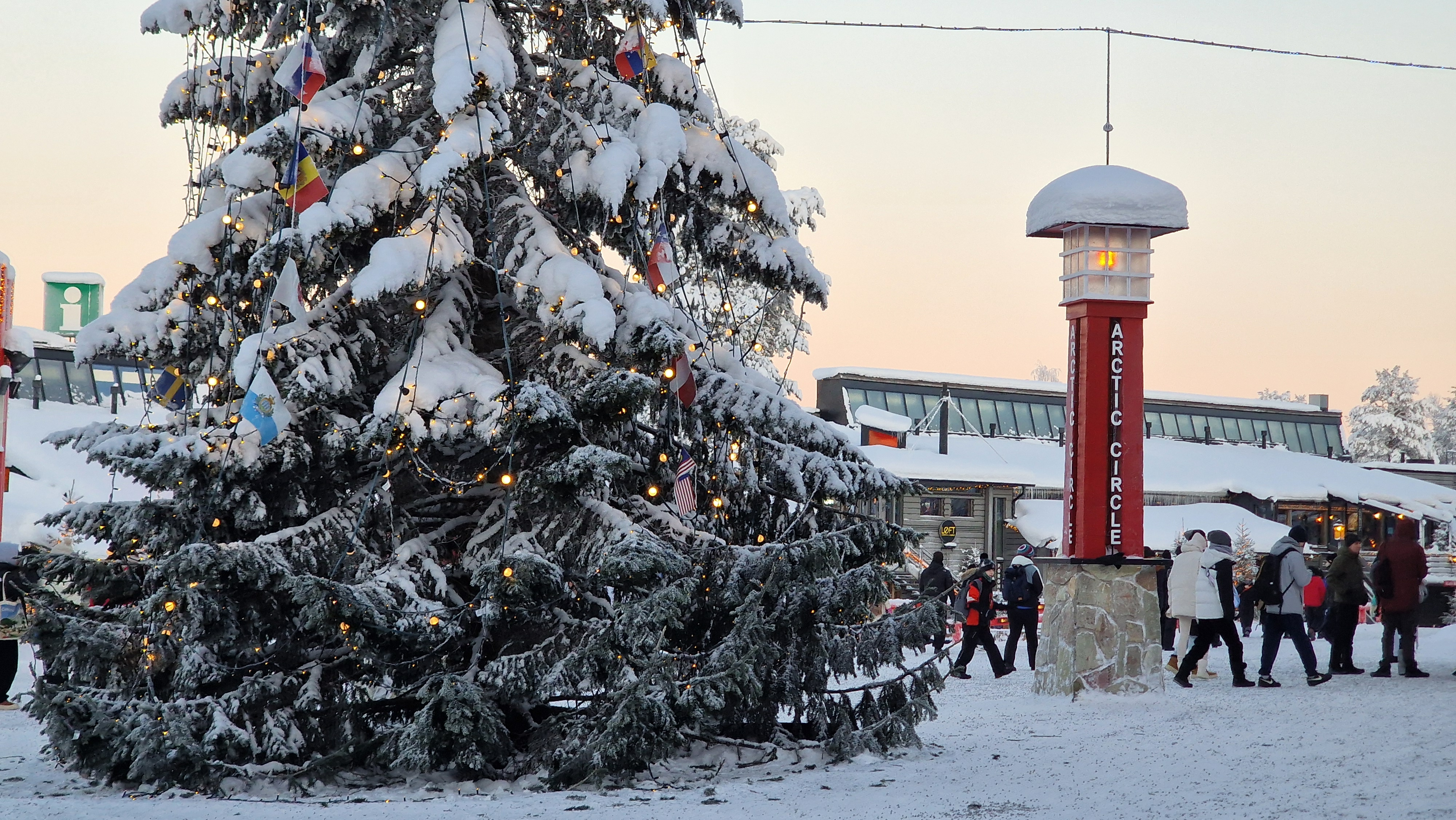
Santa Claus Village at the Arctic Circle in Rovaniemi, Finland

- Arctic Circle: The Arctic Circle ostensibly cuts right through Santa Claus Village. A white line denoting the Arctic Circle (at its position in 1865) is painted across the park. Visitors officially enter the Arctic area when they cross the line. The line is a trendy photo spot for visitors. There is also a webcam near the line that has been live broadcasting since 2009. The Arctic Circle is actually 700 meters to the north, just south of the Rovaniemi Airport.)
- Santa's House of Snowmobiles: A museum about the history and evolution of snowmobiles in the Arctic areas.
- Santa Claus's Office: A Santa Claus's Office is located inside the main building of the Village, for visitors to take photographs and chat with Santa Claus. However, Santa Claus has an "office hour" and he may not be in the office all the time even when the Village is open.
- Santa Claus' Main Post Office: A post office where visitors can read letters sent to Santa. Writers can also request a letter be mailed to them from Santa before Christmas. The office is an official Finnish post office.
- Northern Lights: also known as Aurora Borealis. The Northern Lights are observed on around 150 nights in a year from mid-August until early April. The Arctic Garden and the top of Ounasvaara fell are the best destinations to witness Northern Lights. The phenomenon is caused by electrically charged particles from the Sun colliding with air molecules in Earth's atmosphere and deflected by Earth's magnetic field. This process results in the emission of colourful light, visible at night. Green is the most common colour in this process, while red, pink, violet, yellow, and even blue may be observable too.

== Awards ==
The Santa Claus Park that is connected to the Santa Claus Village was in 2007 awarded by Topworld International and placed as the second best Travel Adventure in Finland. Since 2008, it still holds second position after Topworld invited travellers to vote for their own Top 10 list over adventures.

== Gallery ==
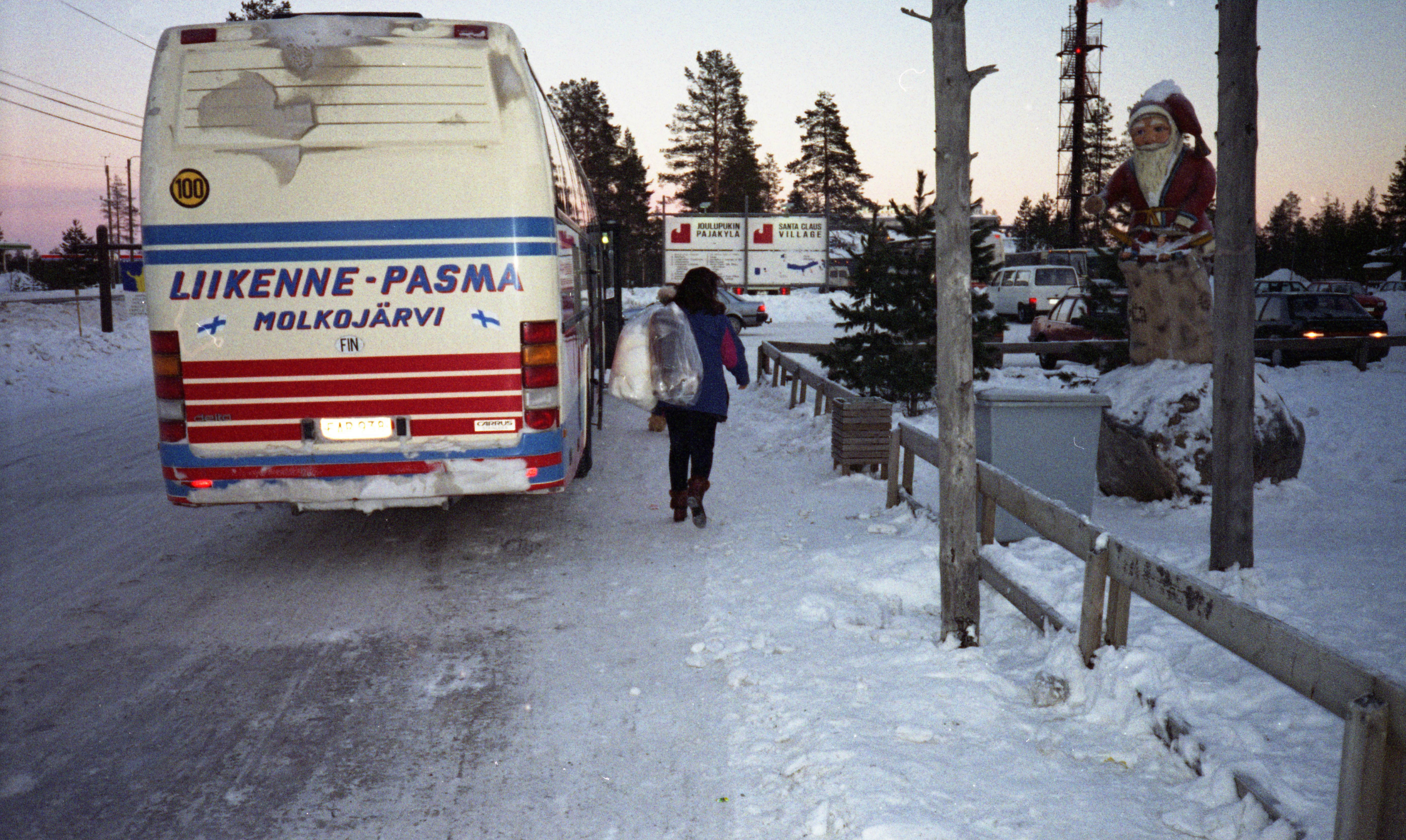
Santa Claus Village back in 1990s

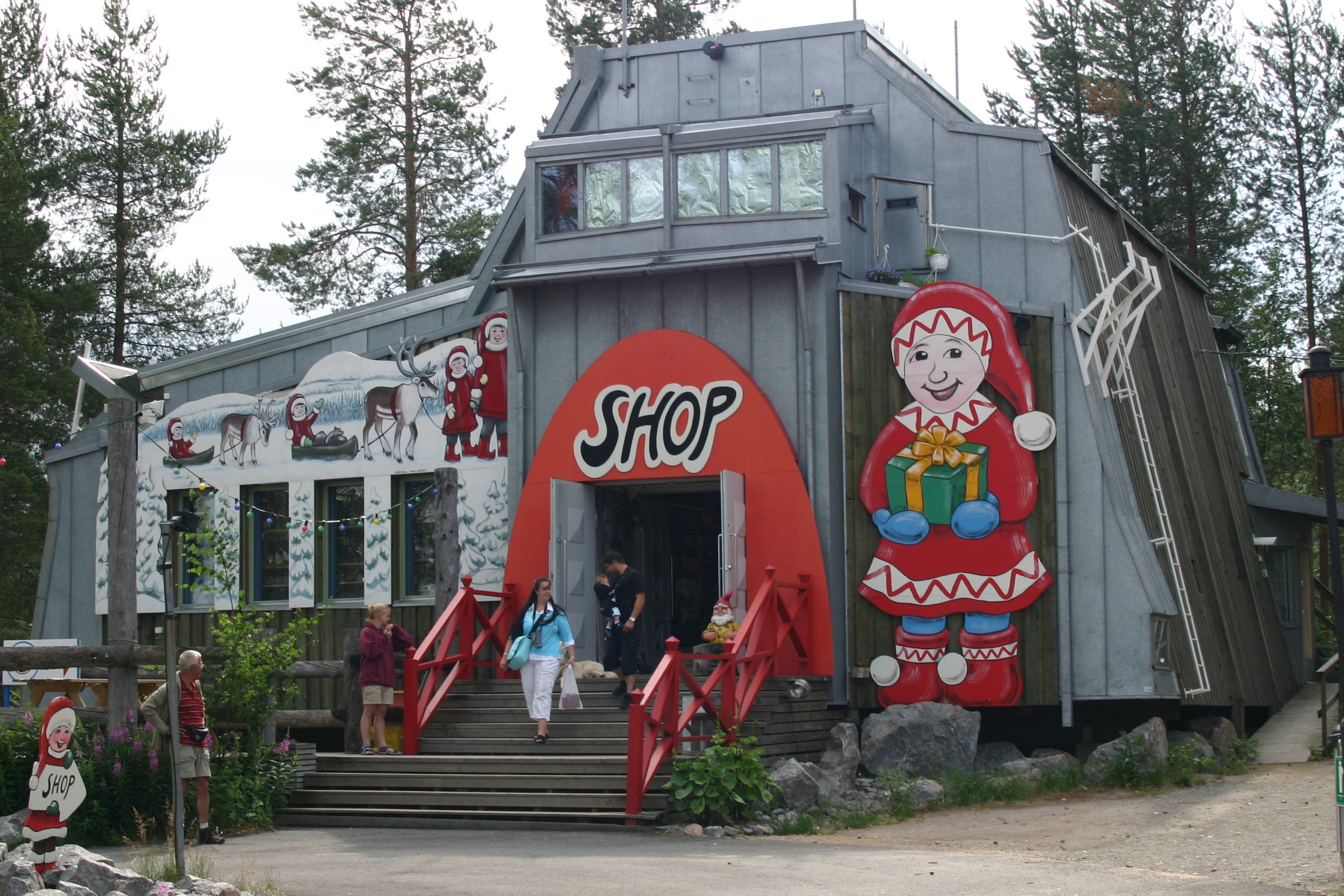
Shop at Santa Claus' Village

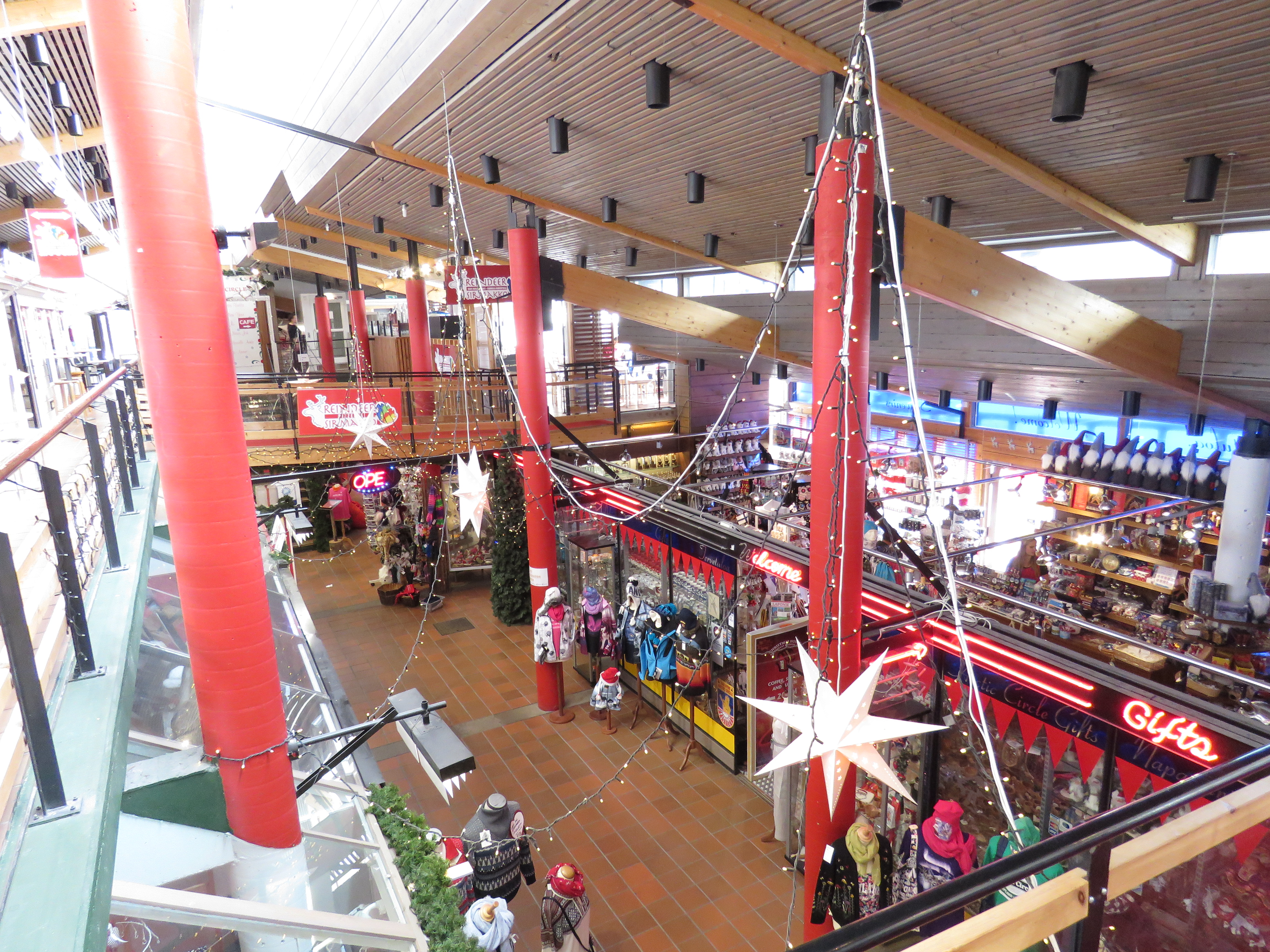
Interiors of the Santa's Gift House at Santa Claus' Village

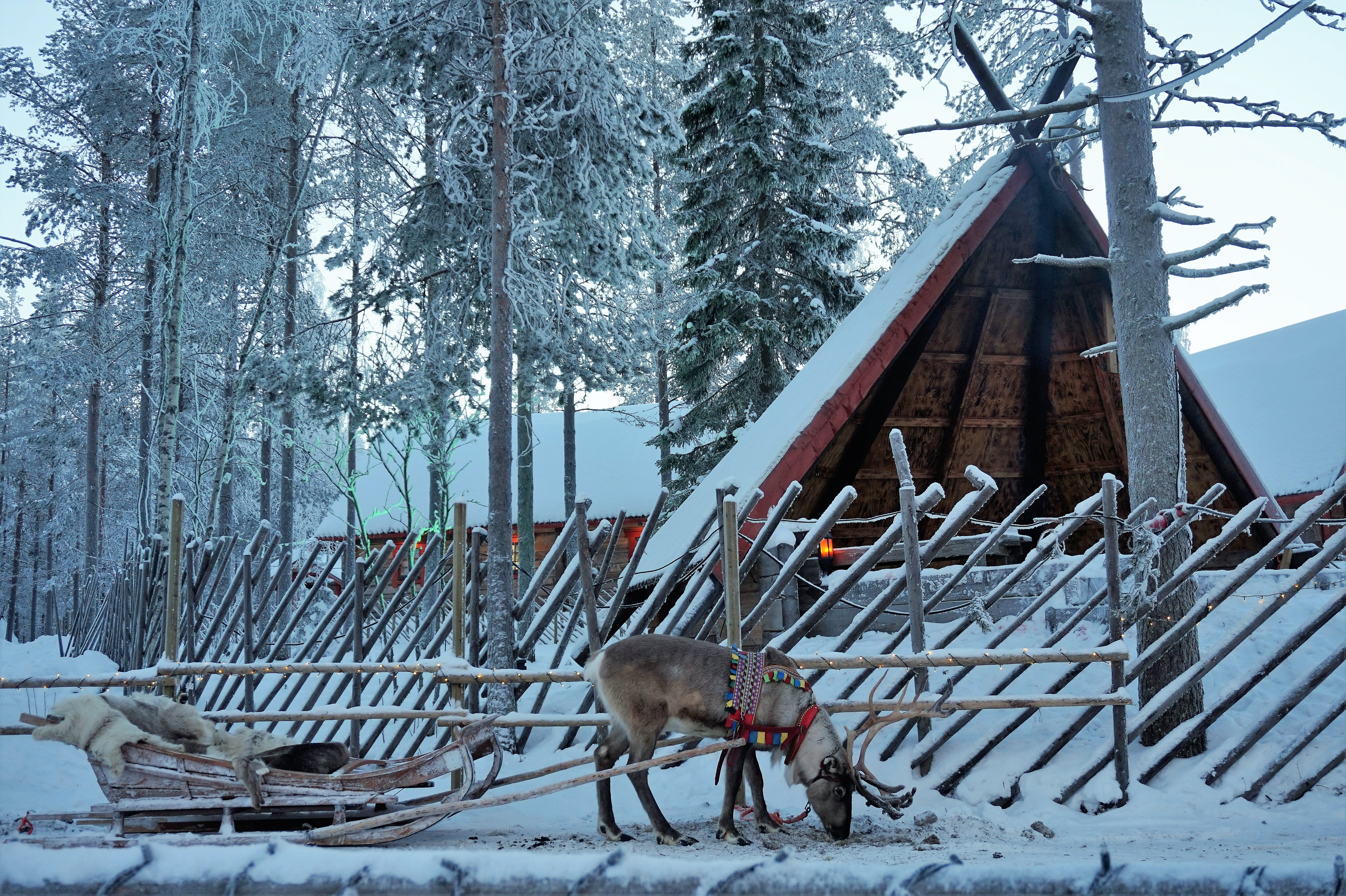
A reindeer in a carriage

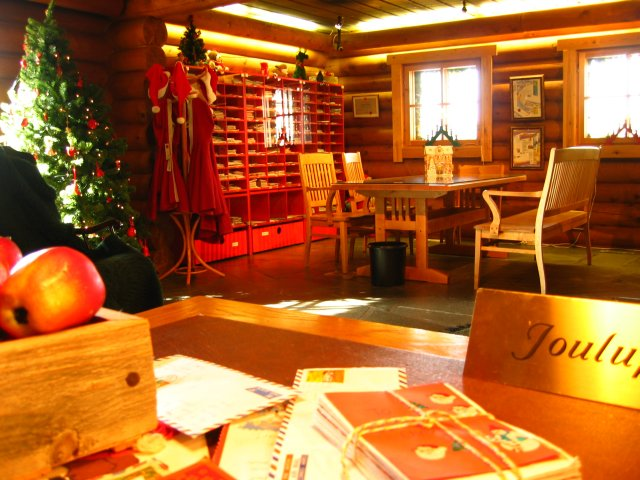
The main post office

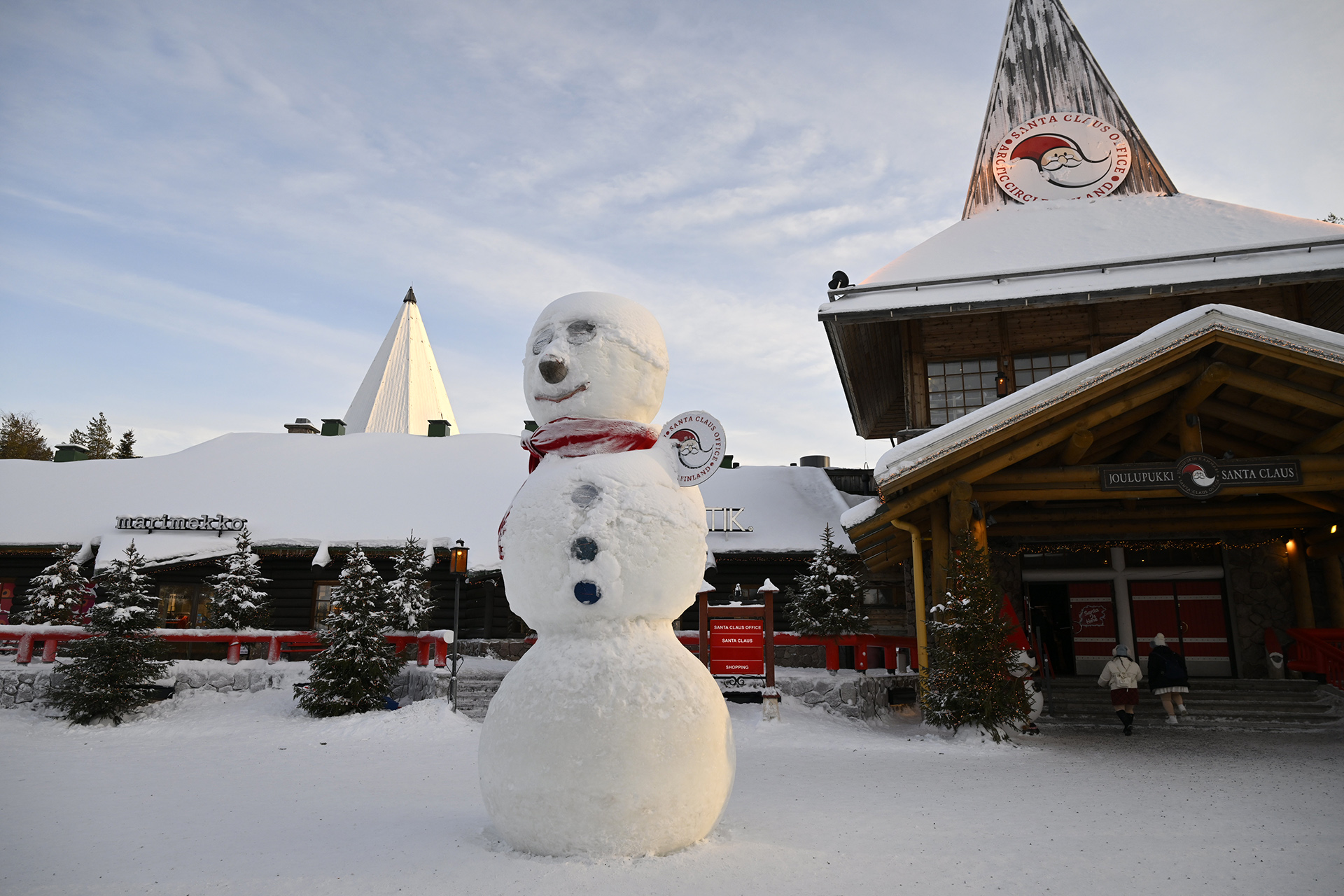
Santa Claus Village at Rovaniemi, Finland

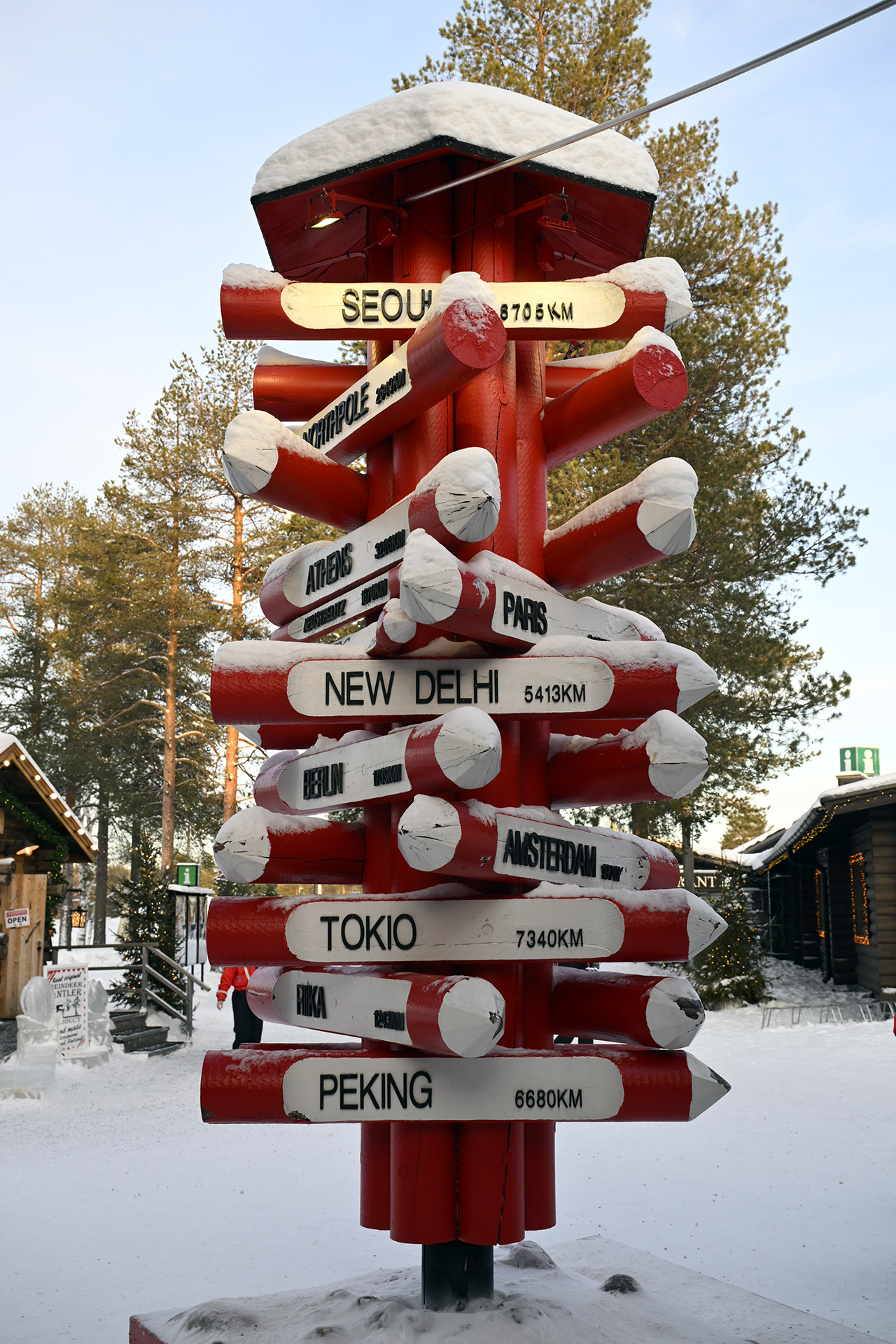
Santa Claus Village at Rovaniemi, Finland

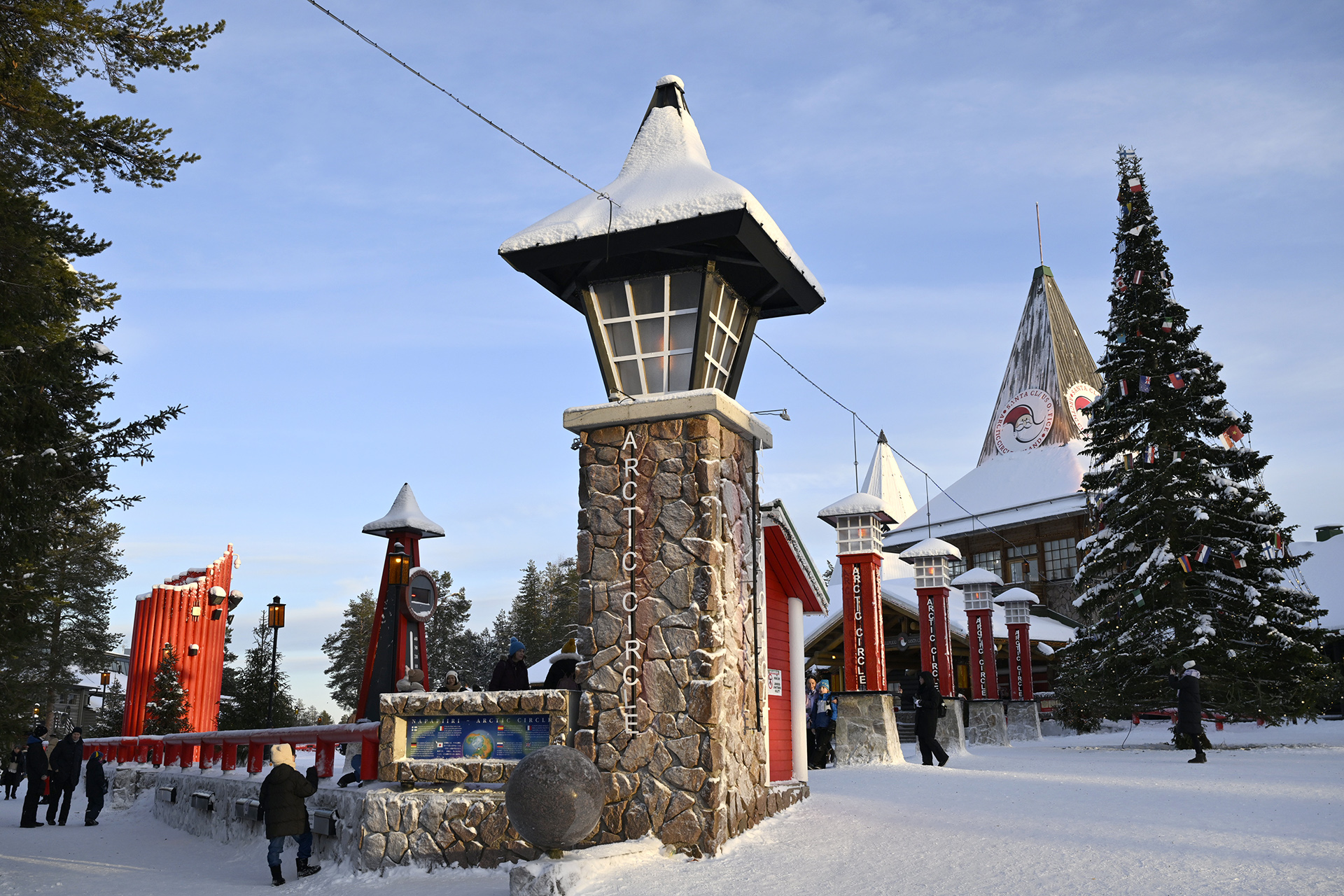
Santa Claus Village at Rovaniemi, Finland

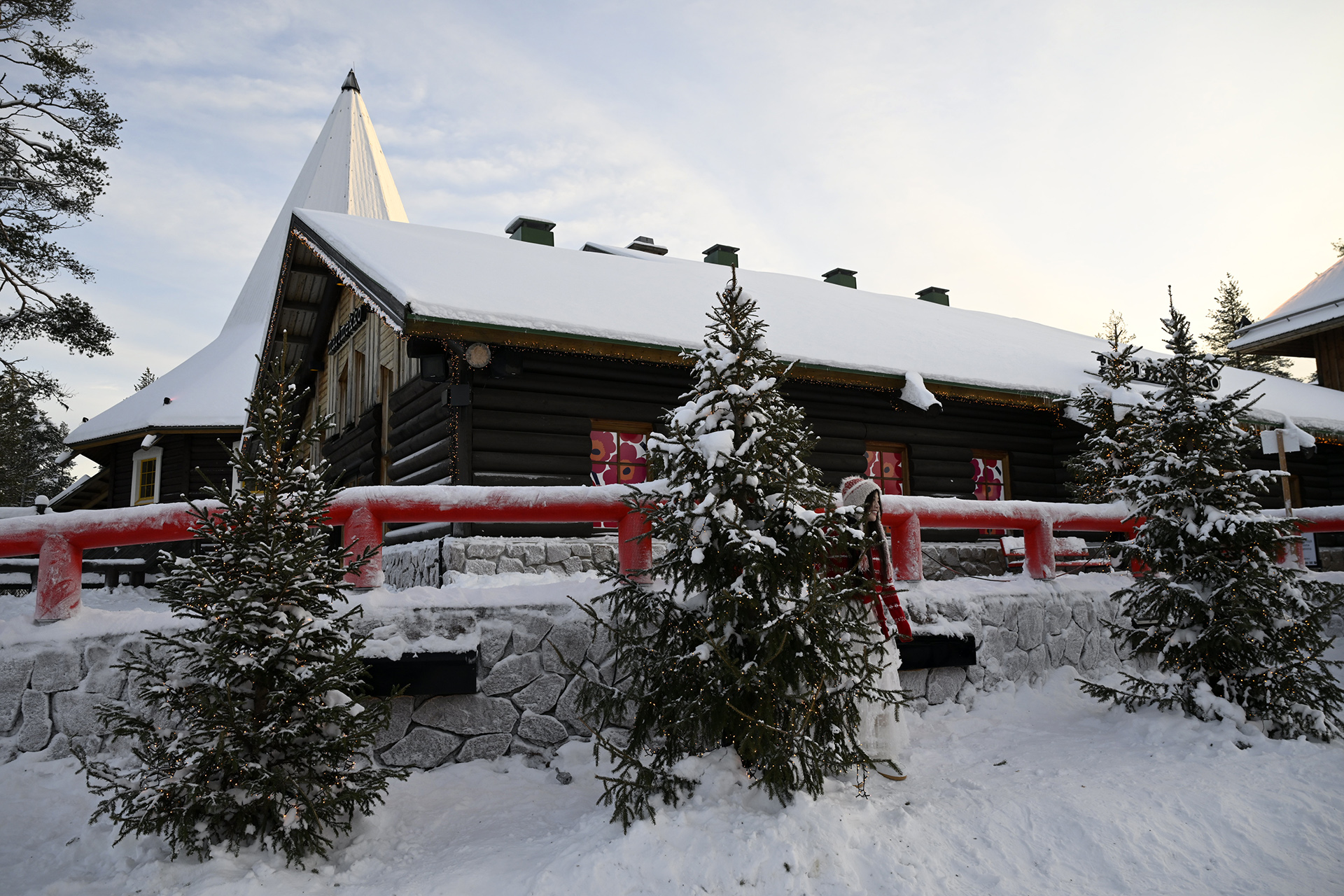
Santa Claus Village at Rovaniemi, Finland

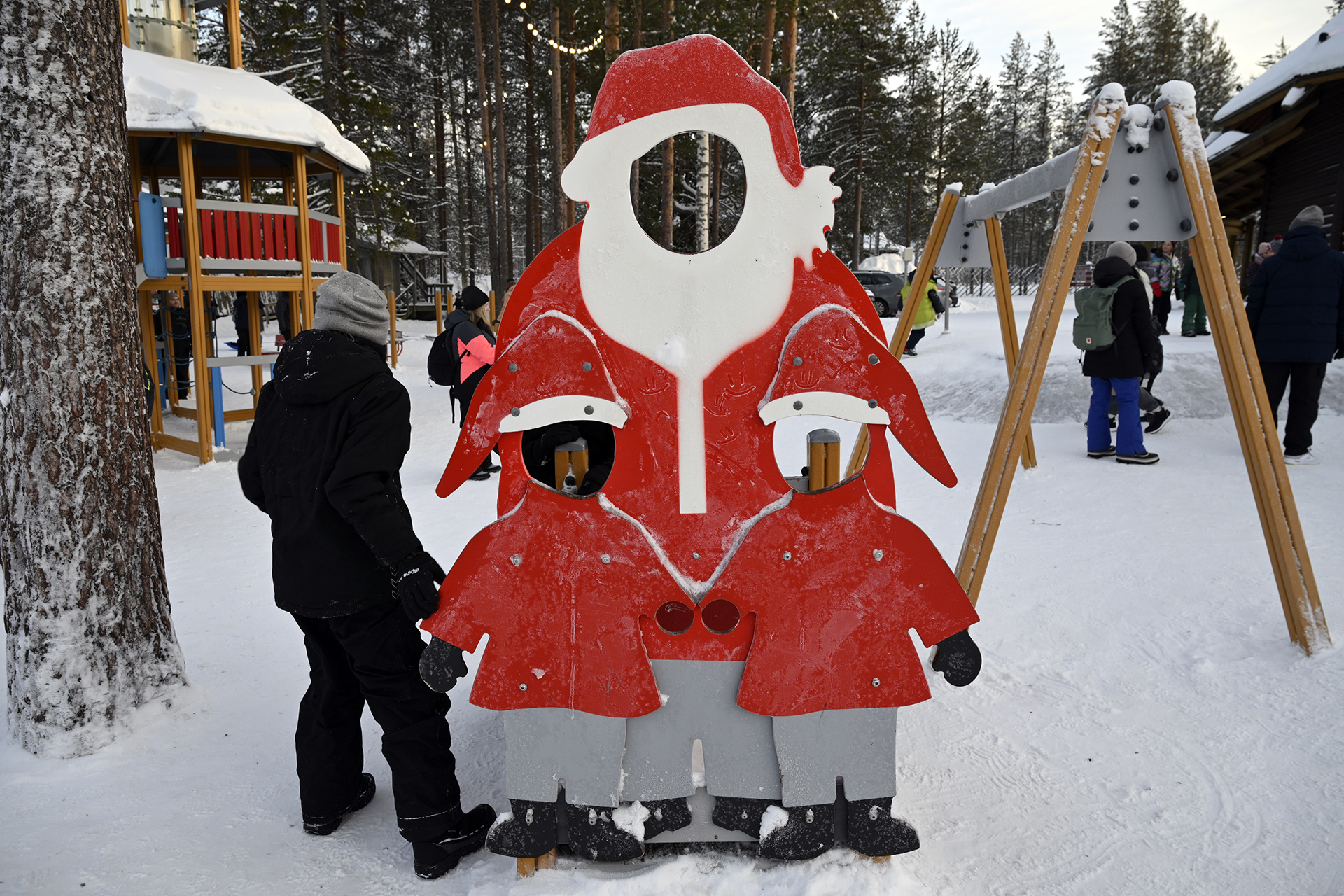
Santa Claus Village at Rovaniemi, Finland

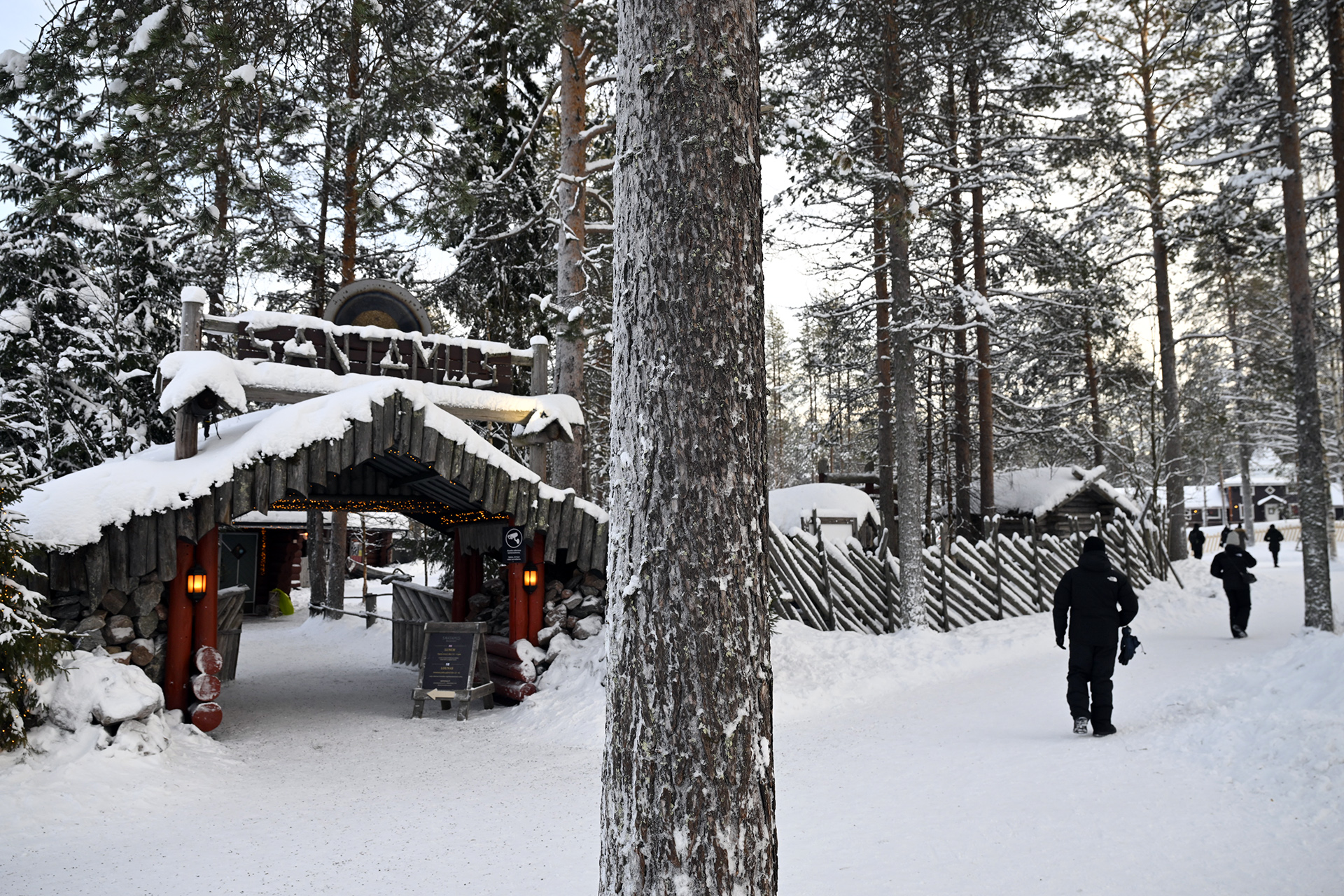
Santa Claus Village at Rovaniemi, Finland

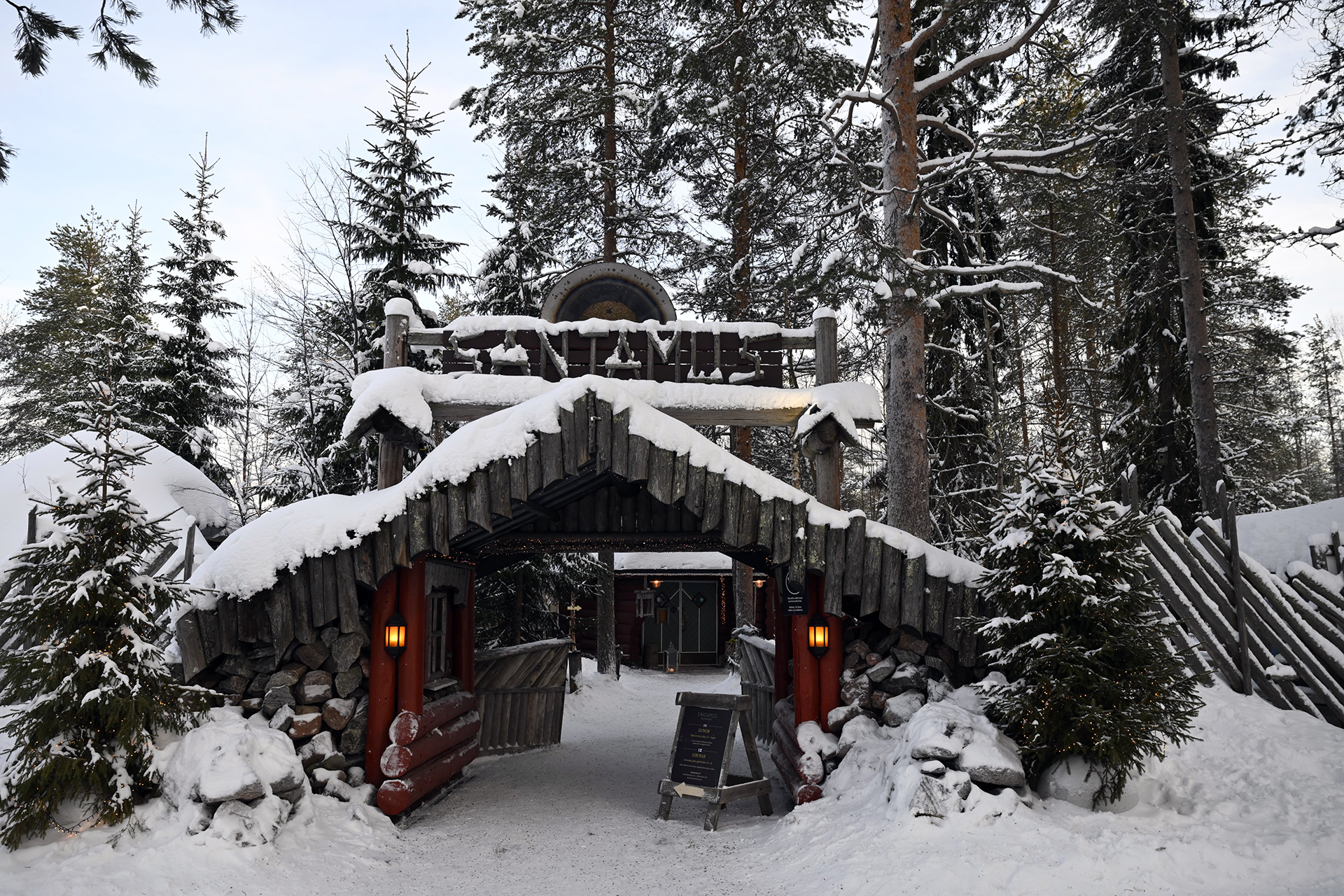
Santa Claus Village at Rovaniemi, Finland

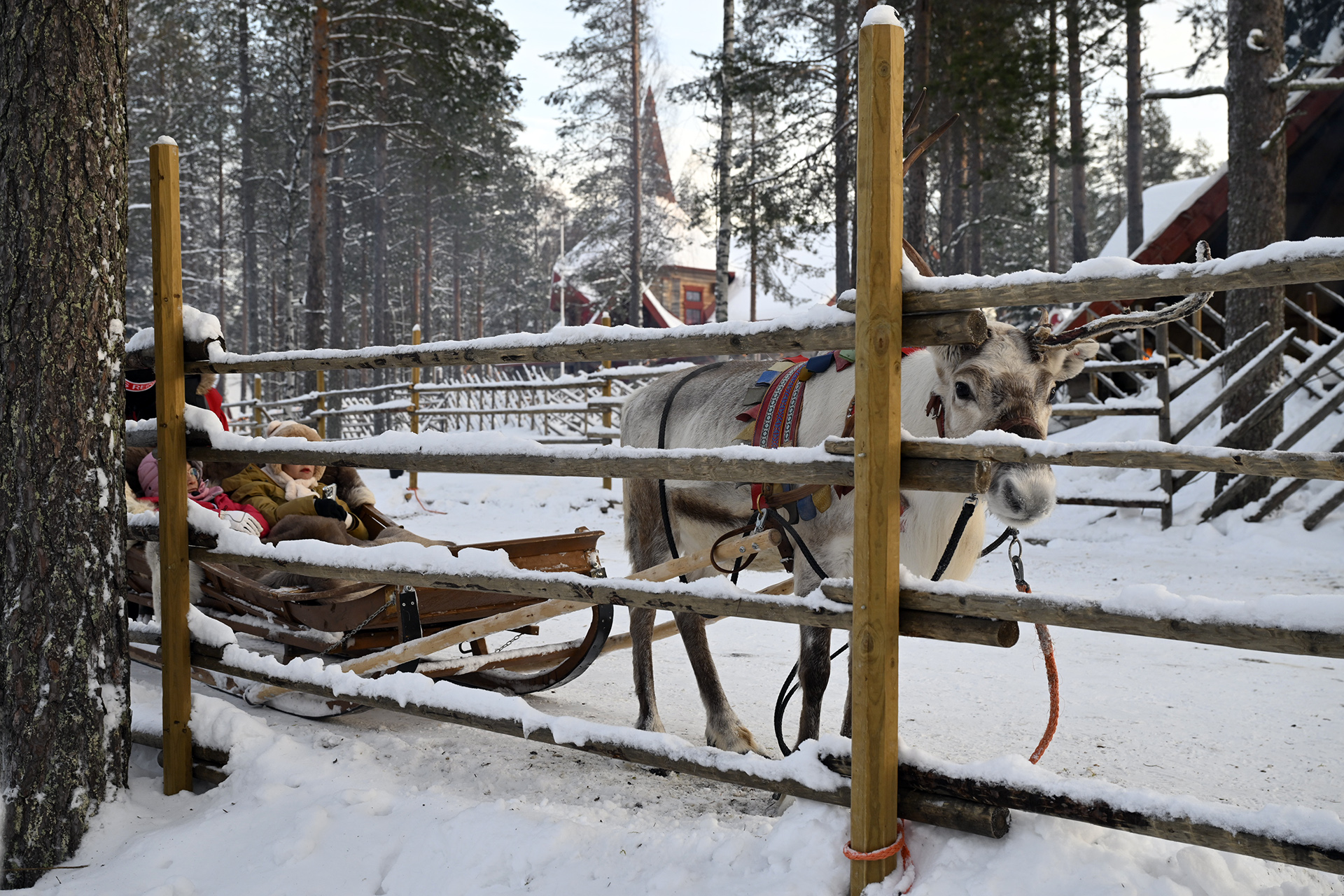
Santa Claus Village at Rovaniemi, Finland

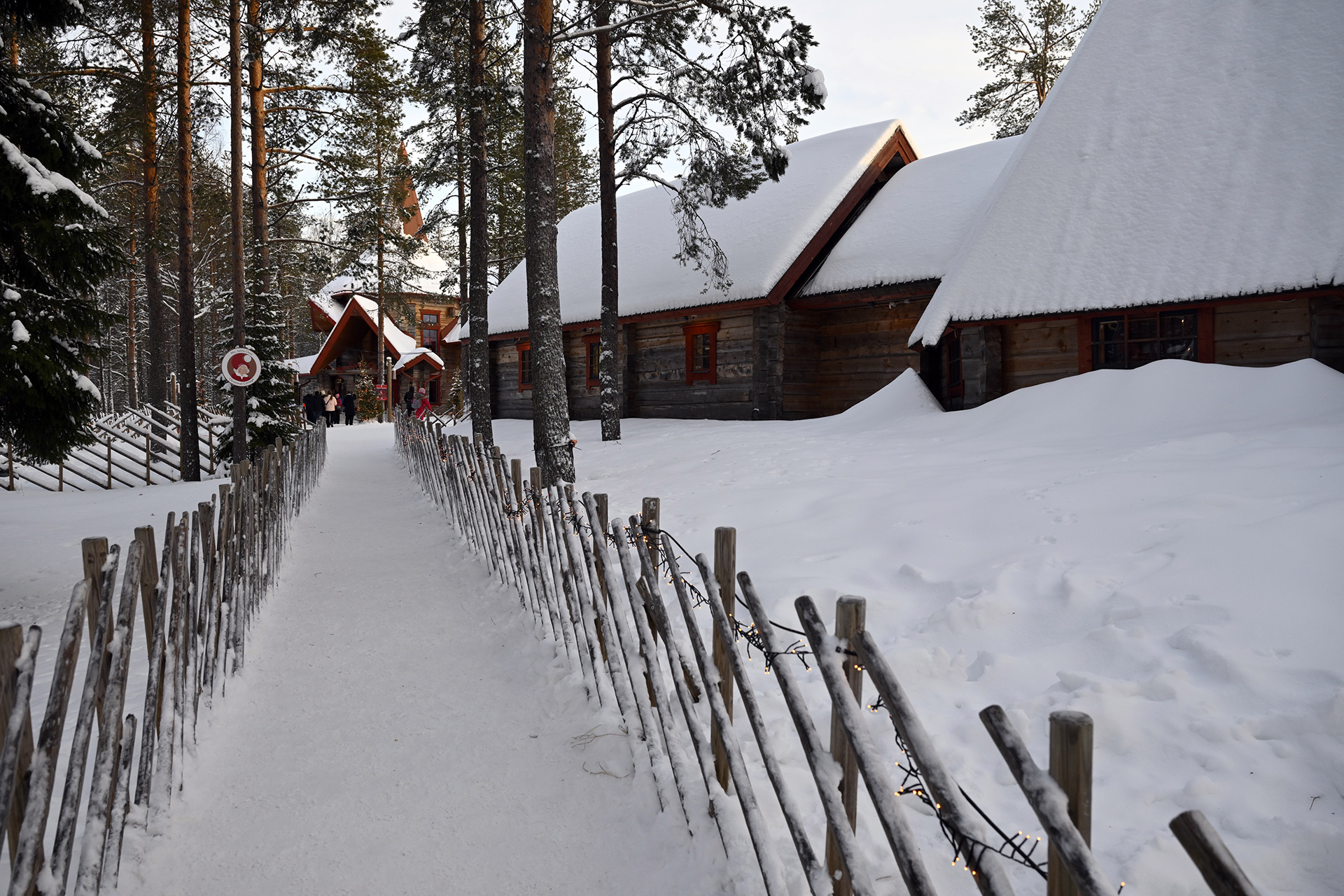
Santa Claus Village at Rovaniemi, Finland

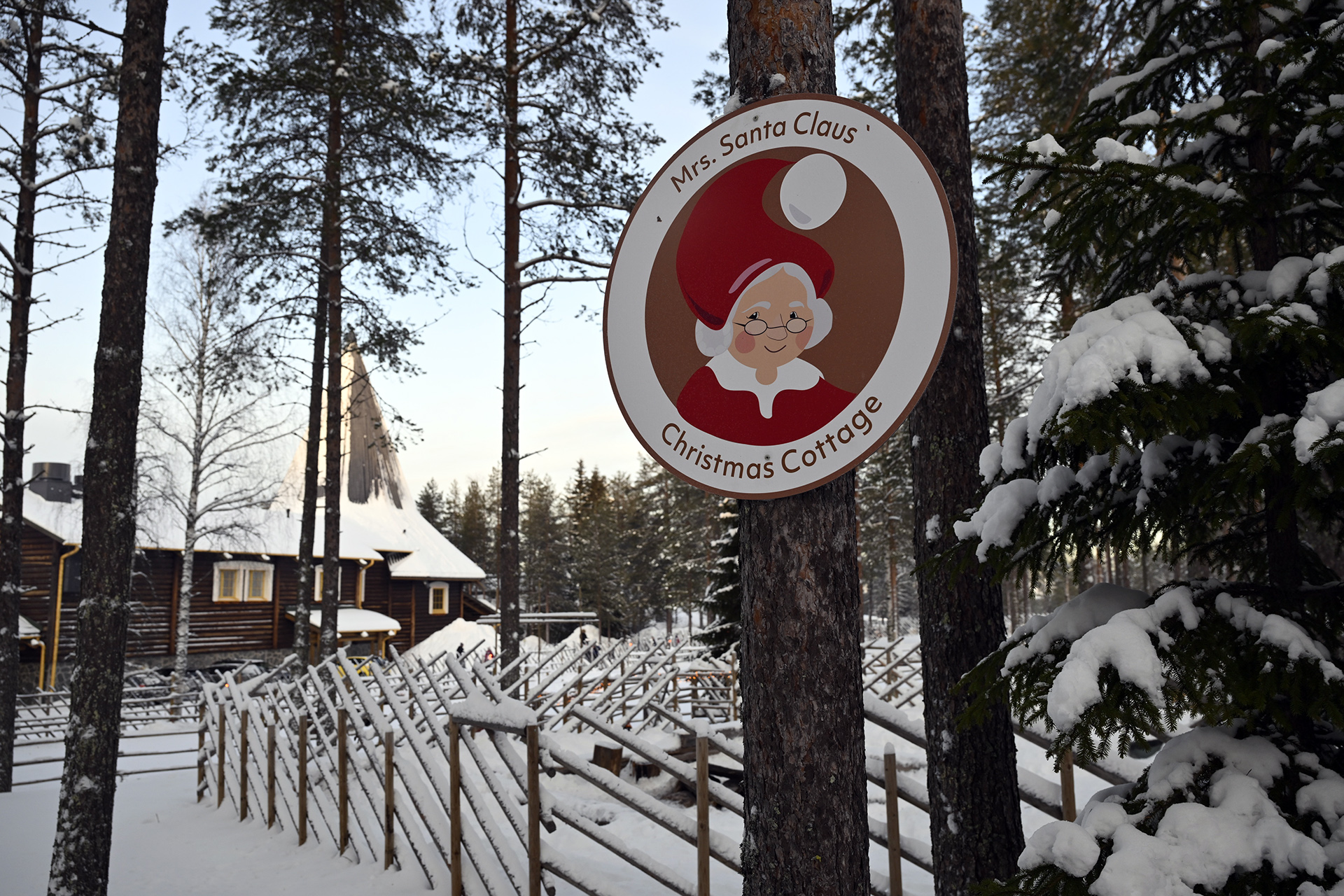
Santa Claus Village at Rovaniemi, Finland

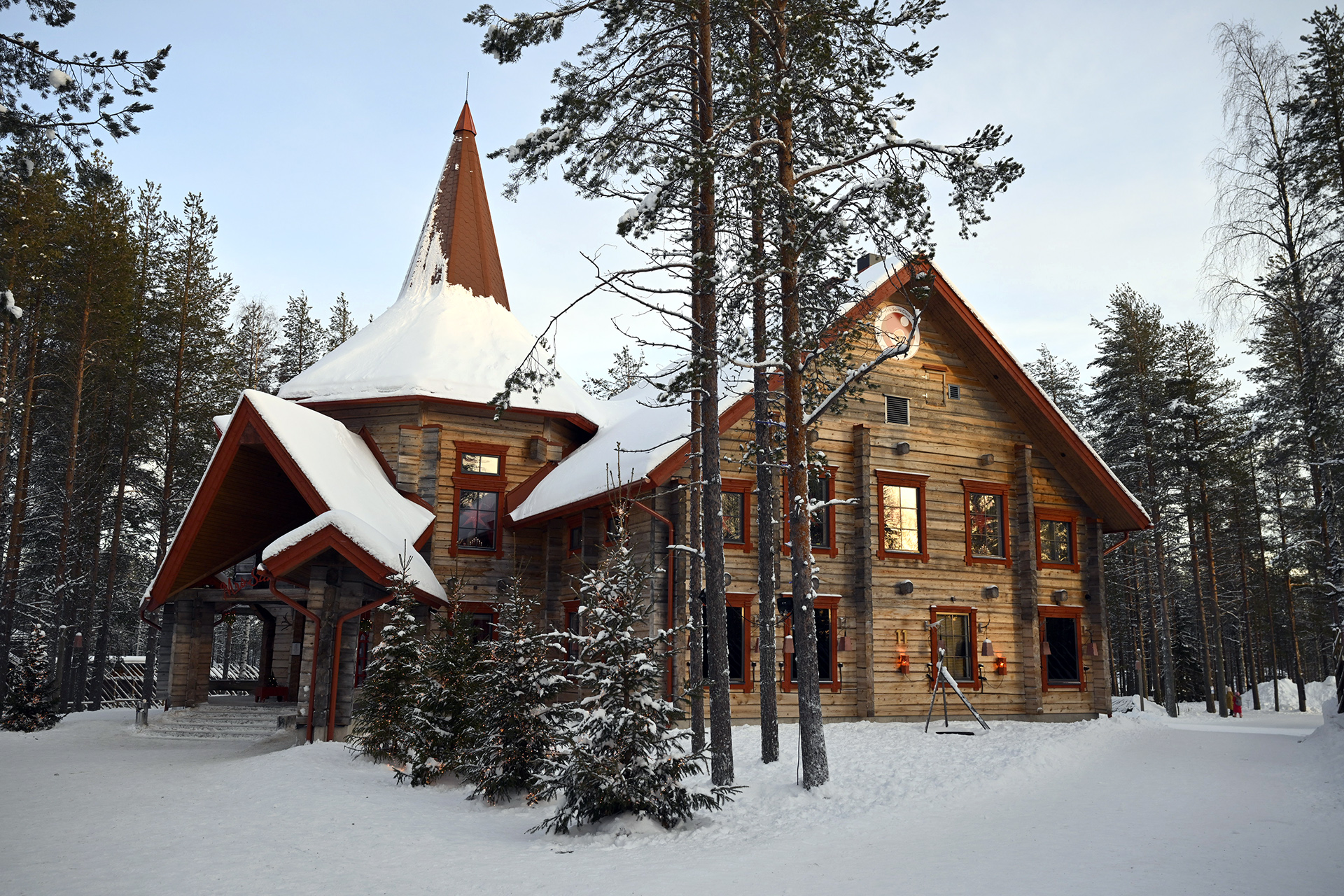
Santa Claus Village at Rovaniemi, Finland

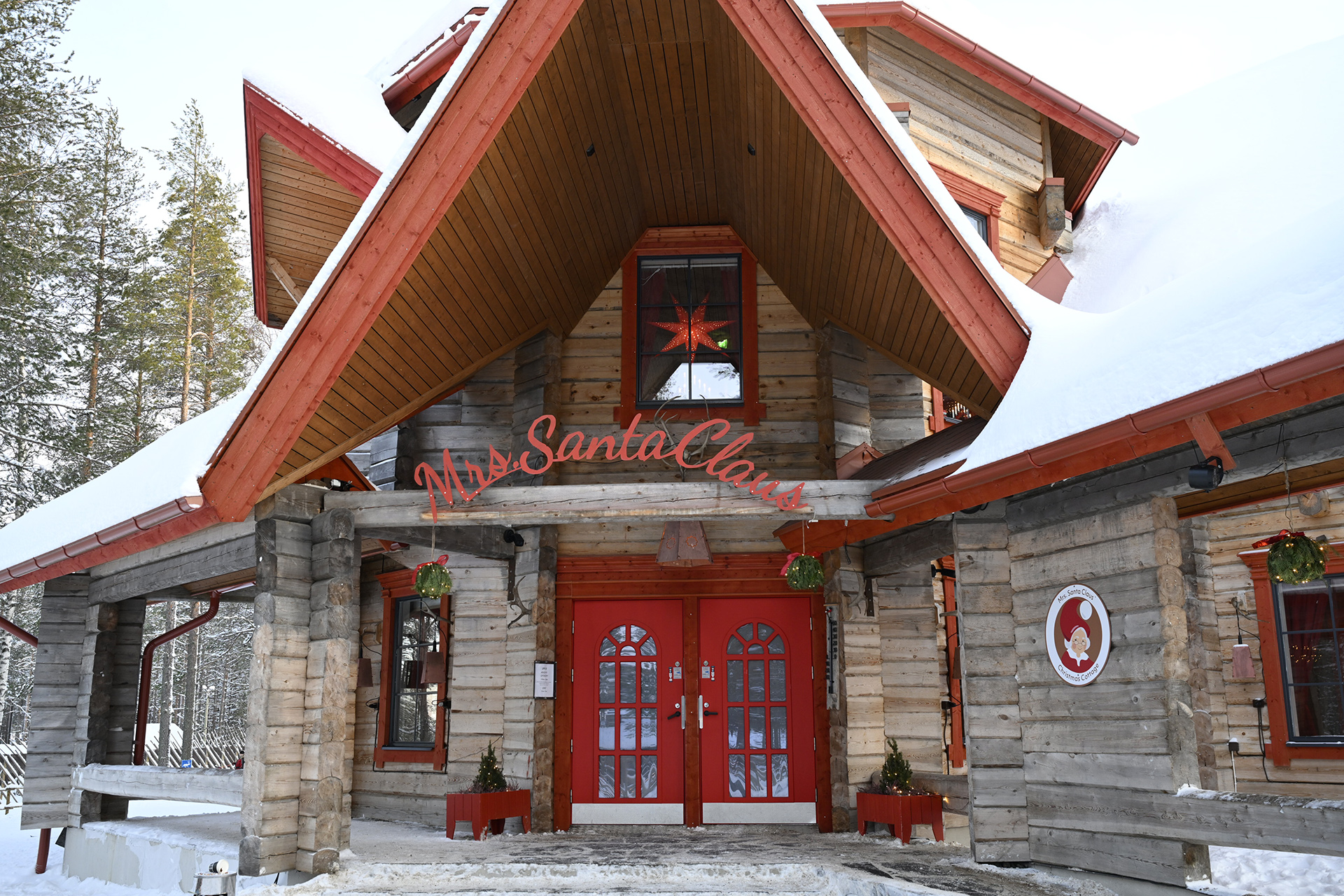
Santa Claus Village at Rovaniemi, Finland

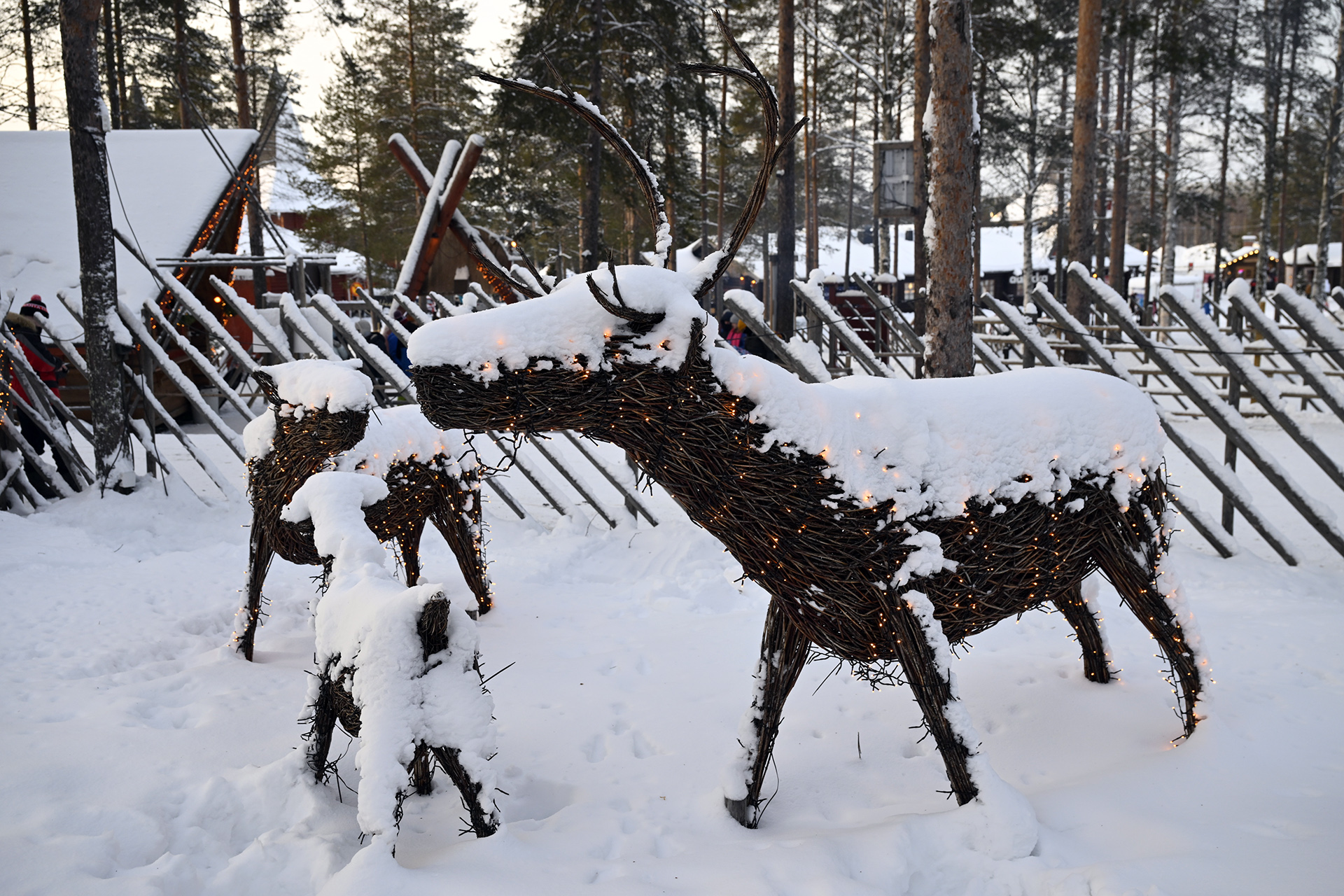
Santa Claus Village at Rovaniemi, Finland

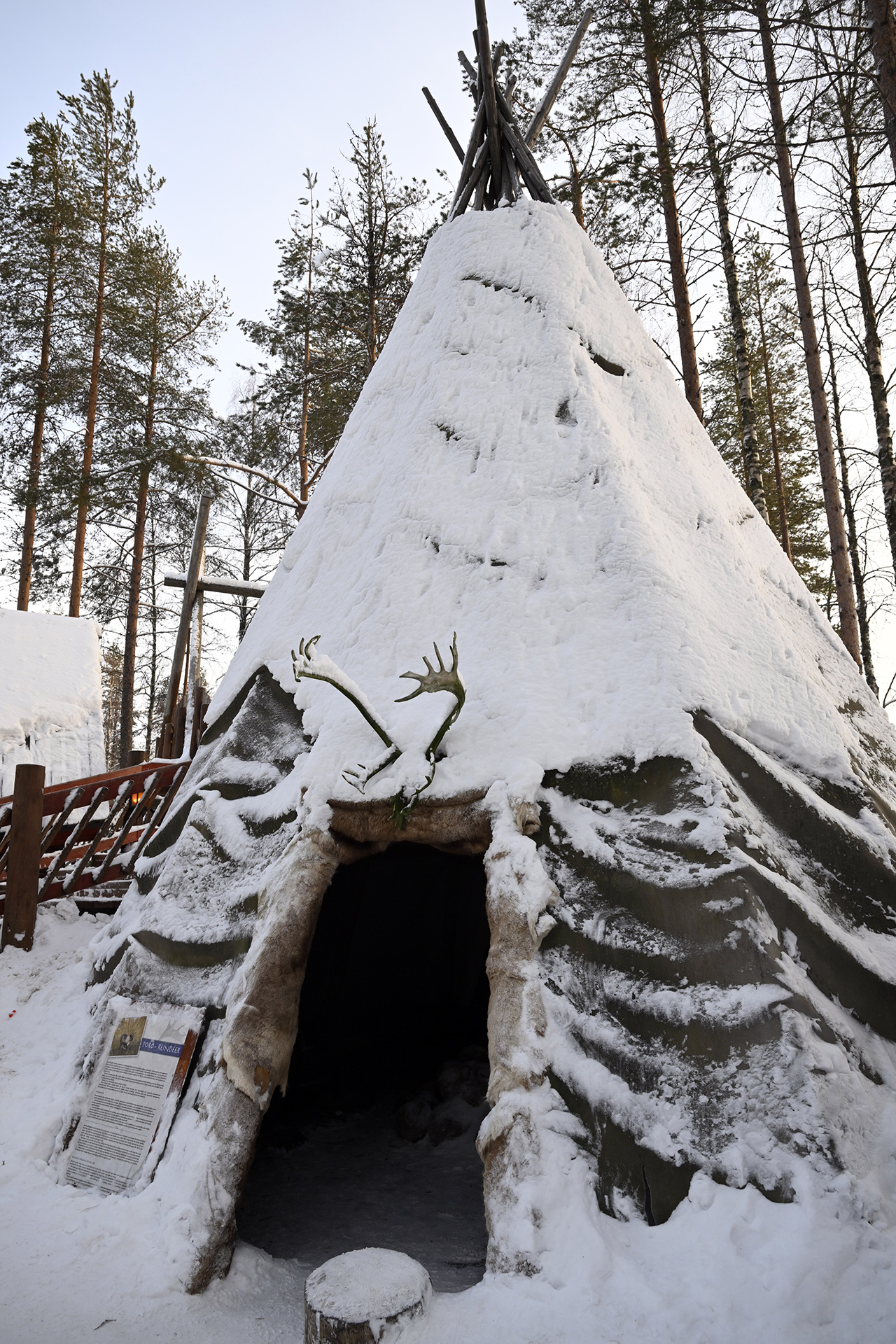
Santa Claus Village at Rovaniemi, Finland

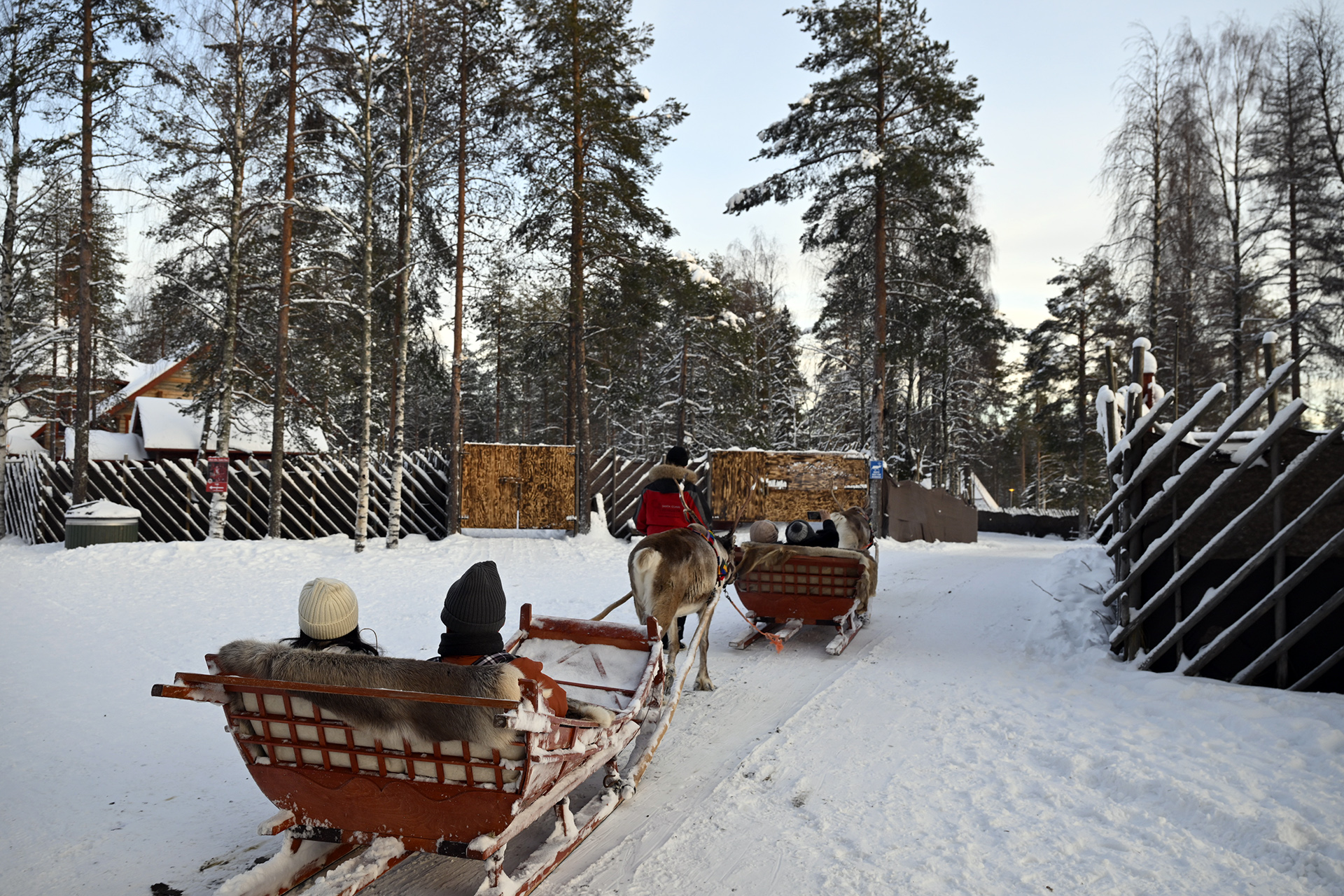
Santa Claus Village at Rovaniemi, Finland

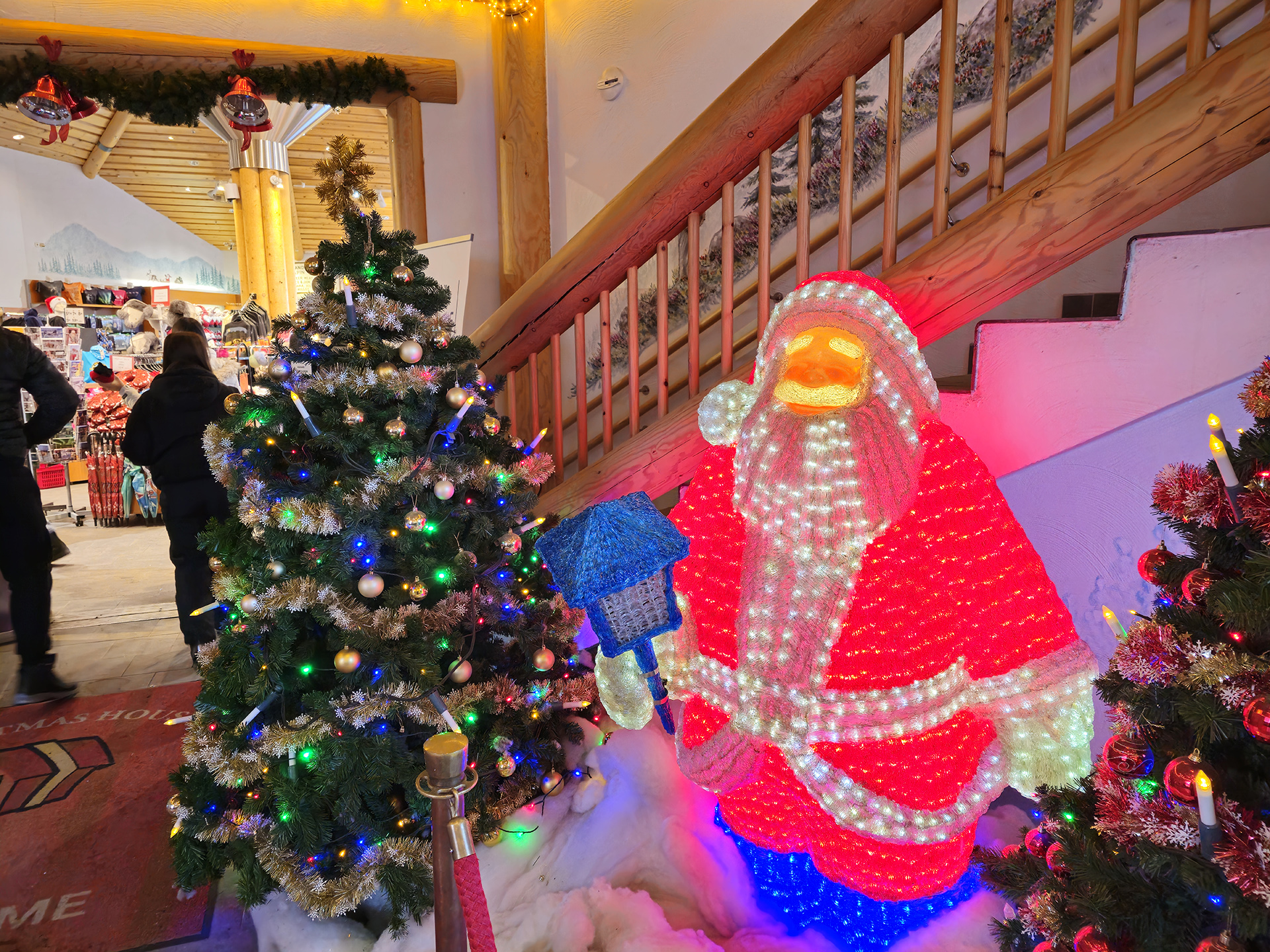
Santa Claus Village at Rovaniemi, Finland

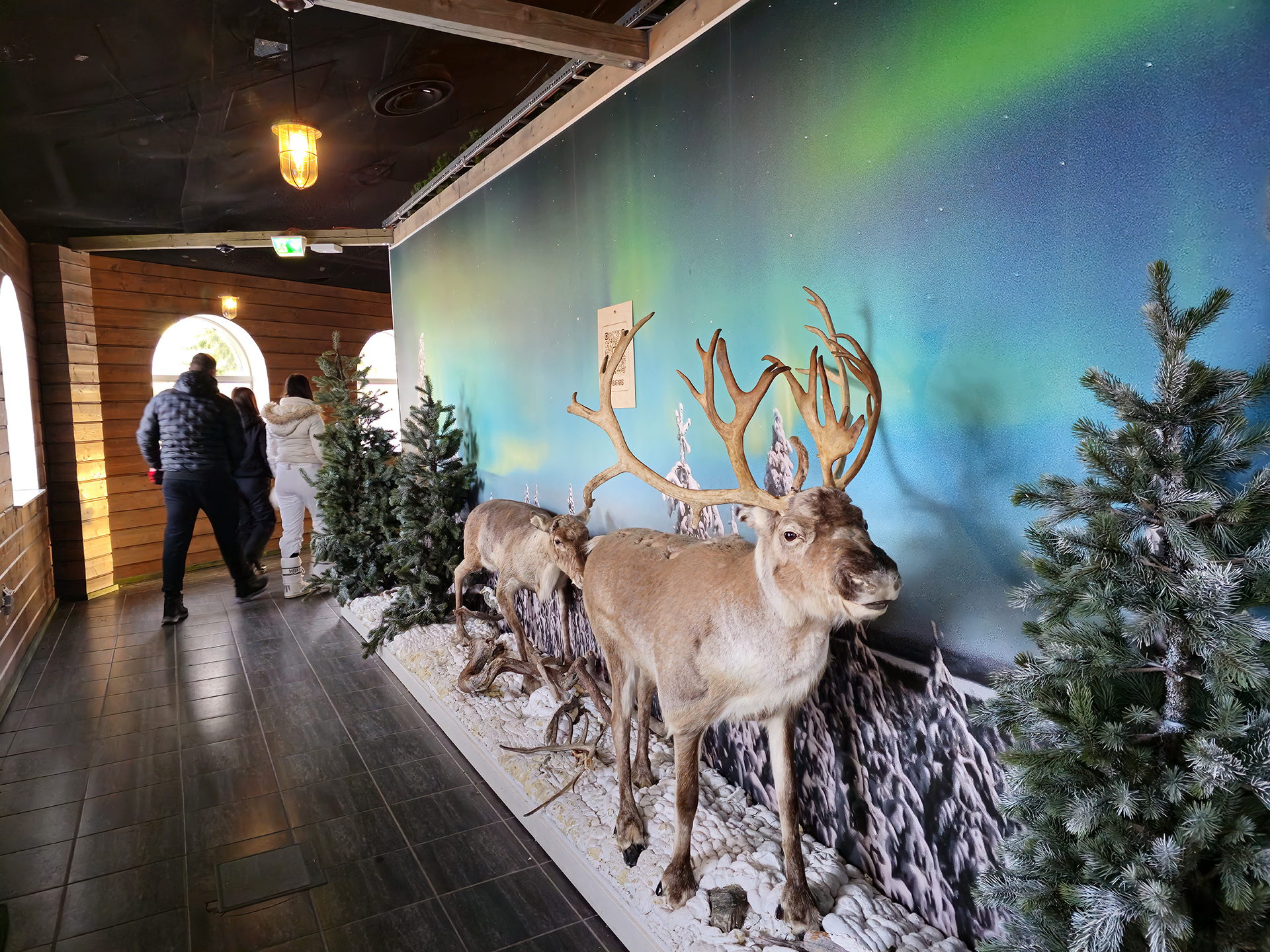
Santa Claus Village at Rovaniemi, Finland

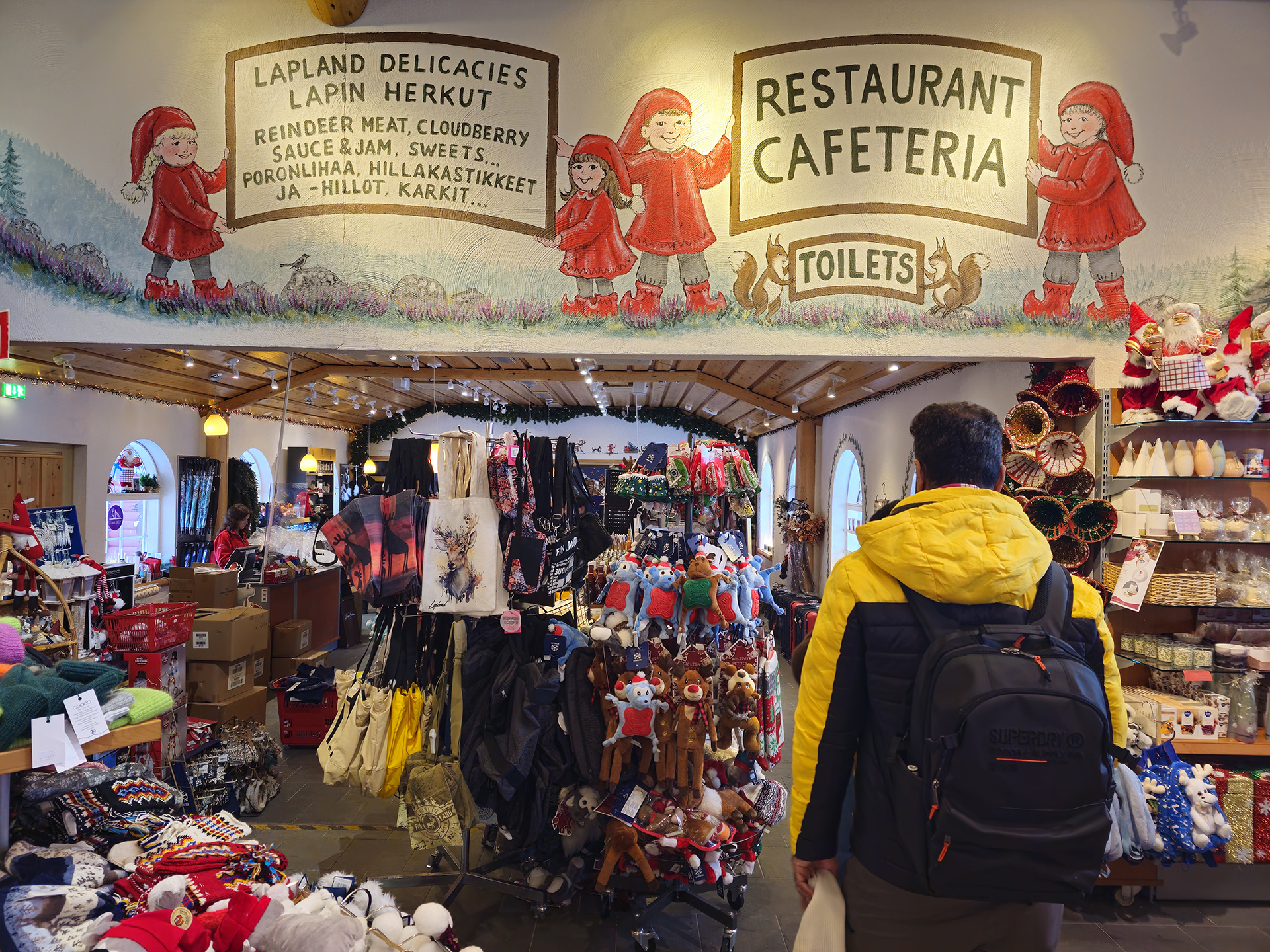
Santa Claus Village at Rovaniemi, Finland

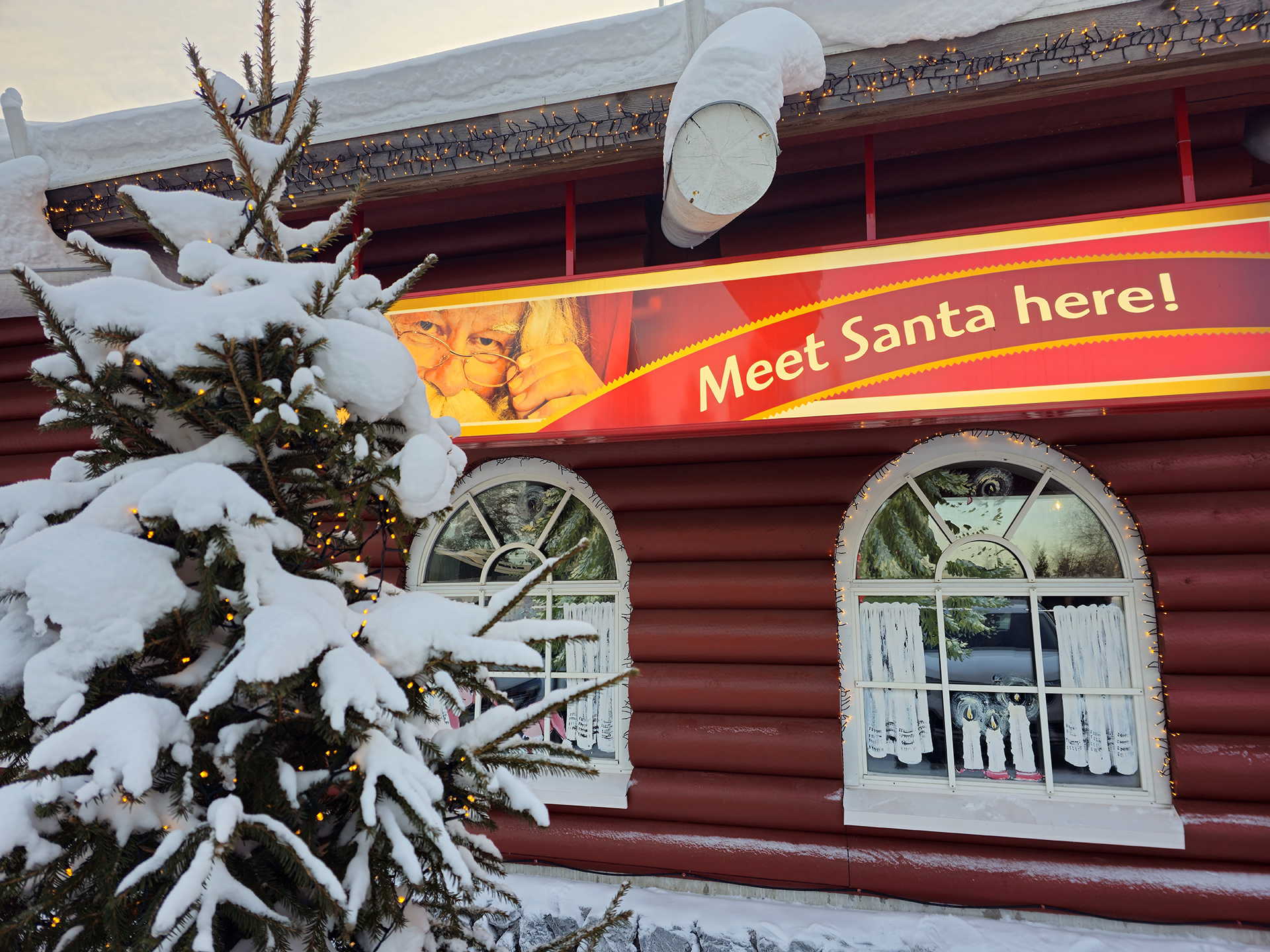
Santa Claus Village at Rovaniemi, Finland

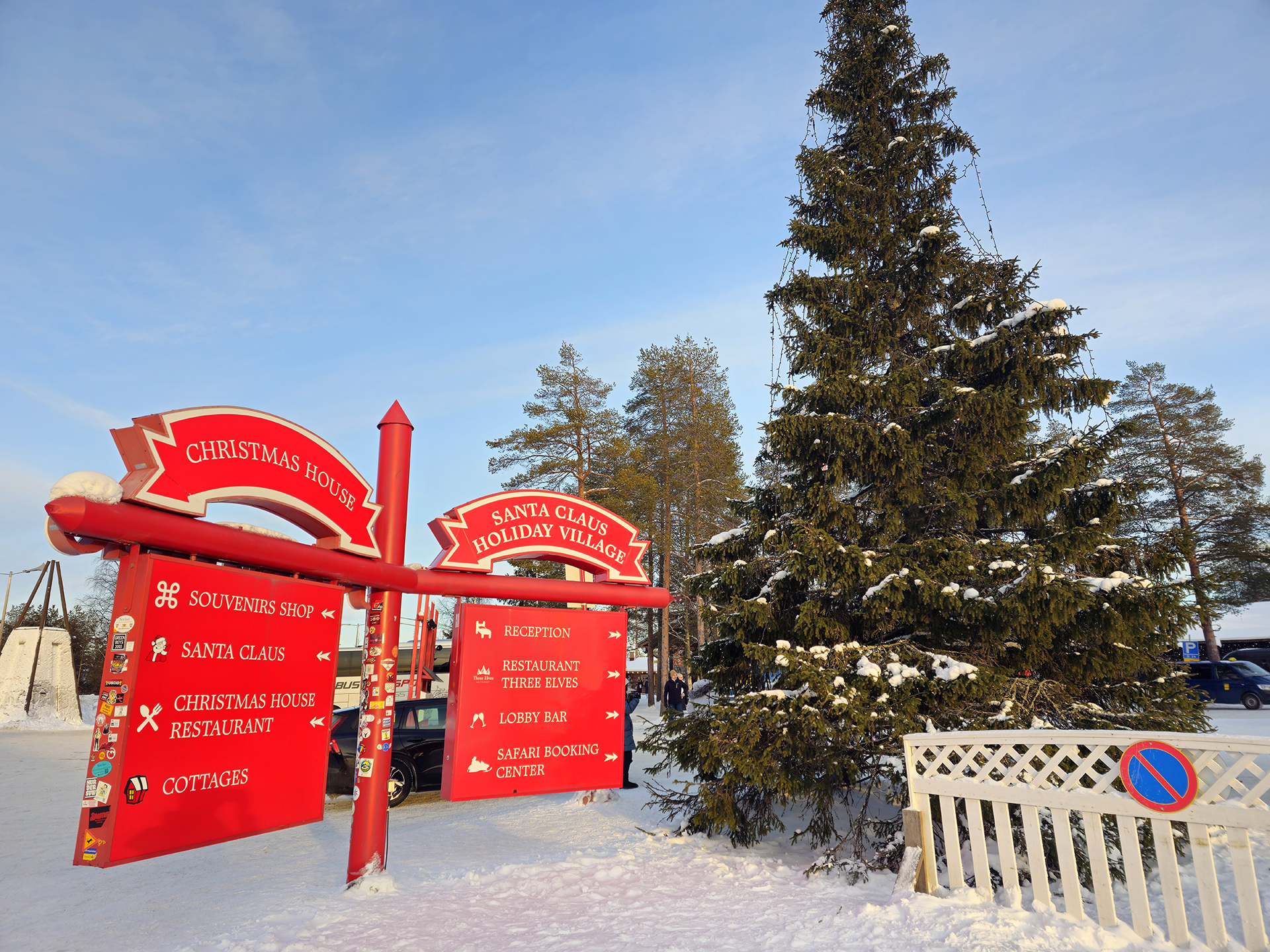
Santa Claus Village at Rovaniemi, Finland

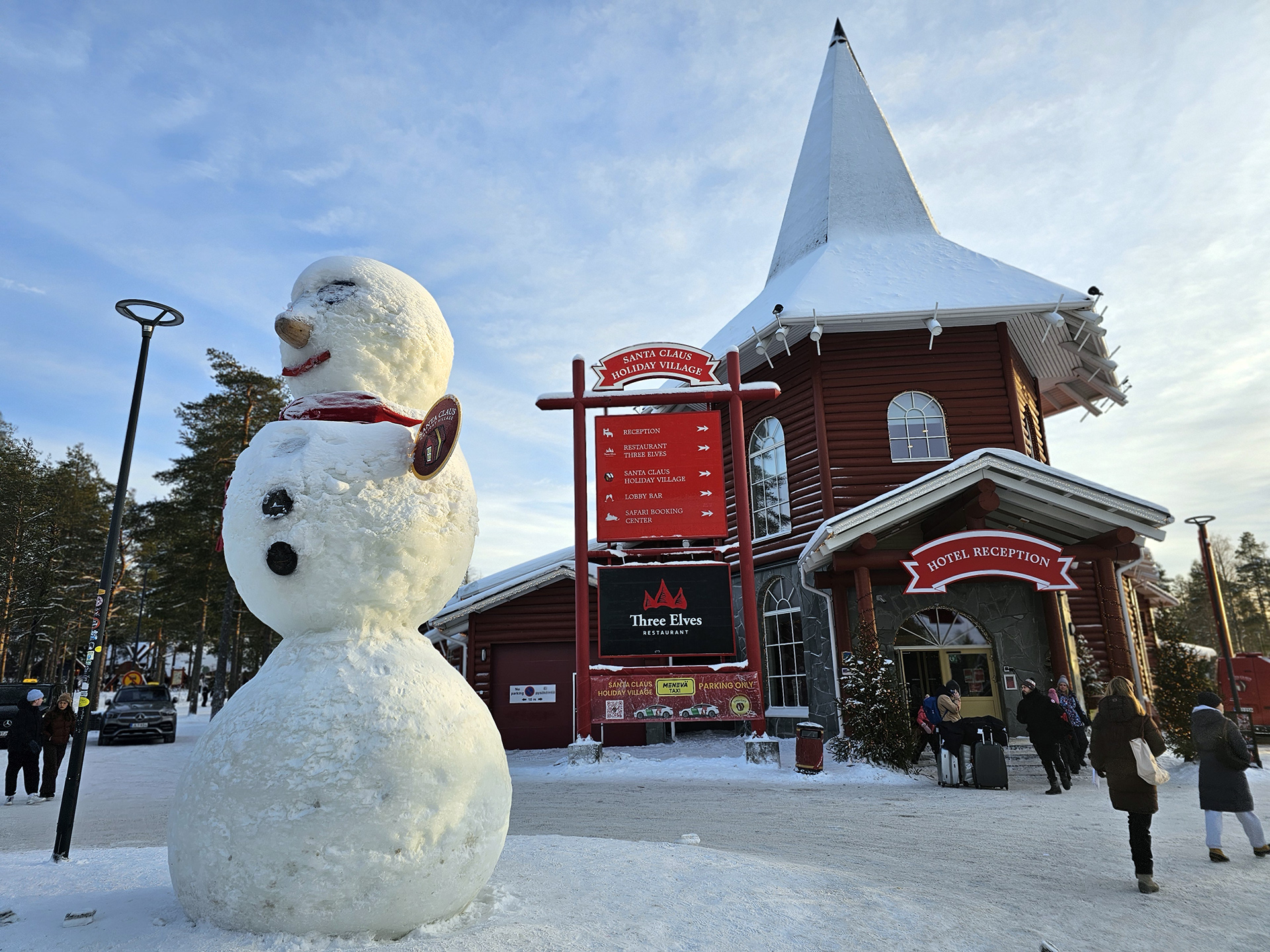
Santa Claus Village at Rovaniemi, Finland

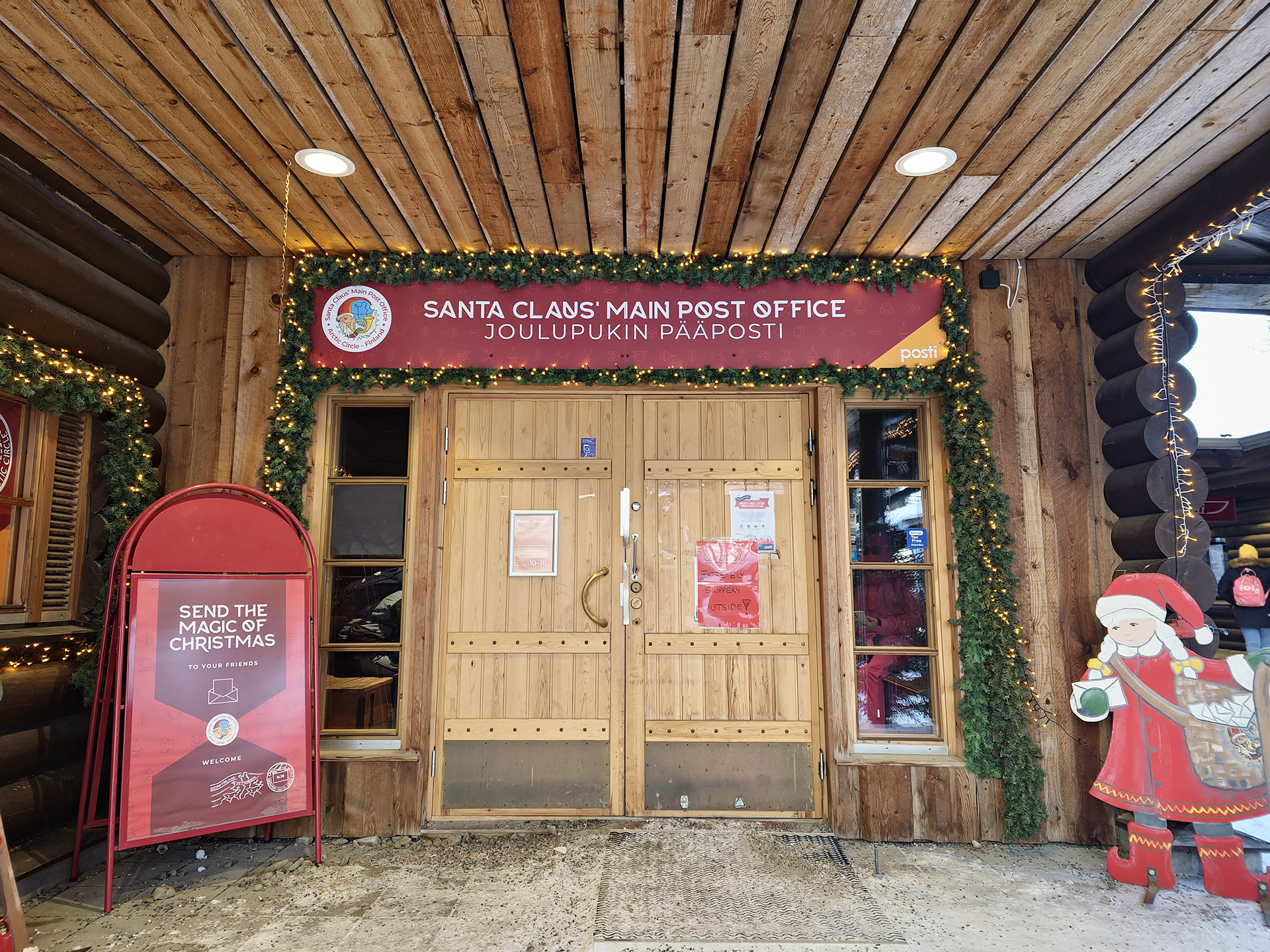
Santa Claus Village at Rovaniemi, Finland

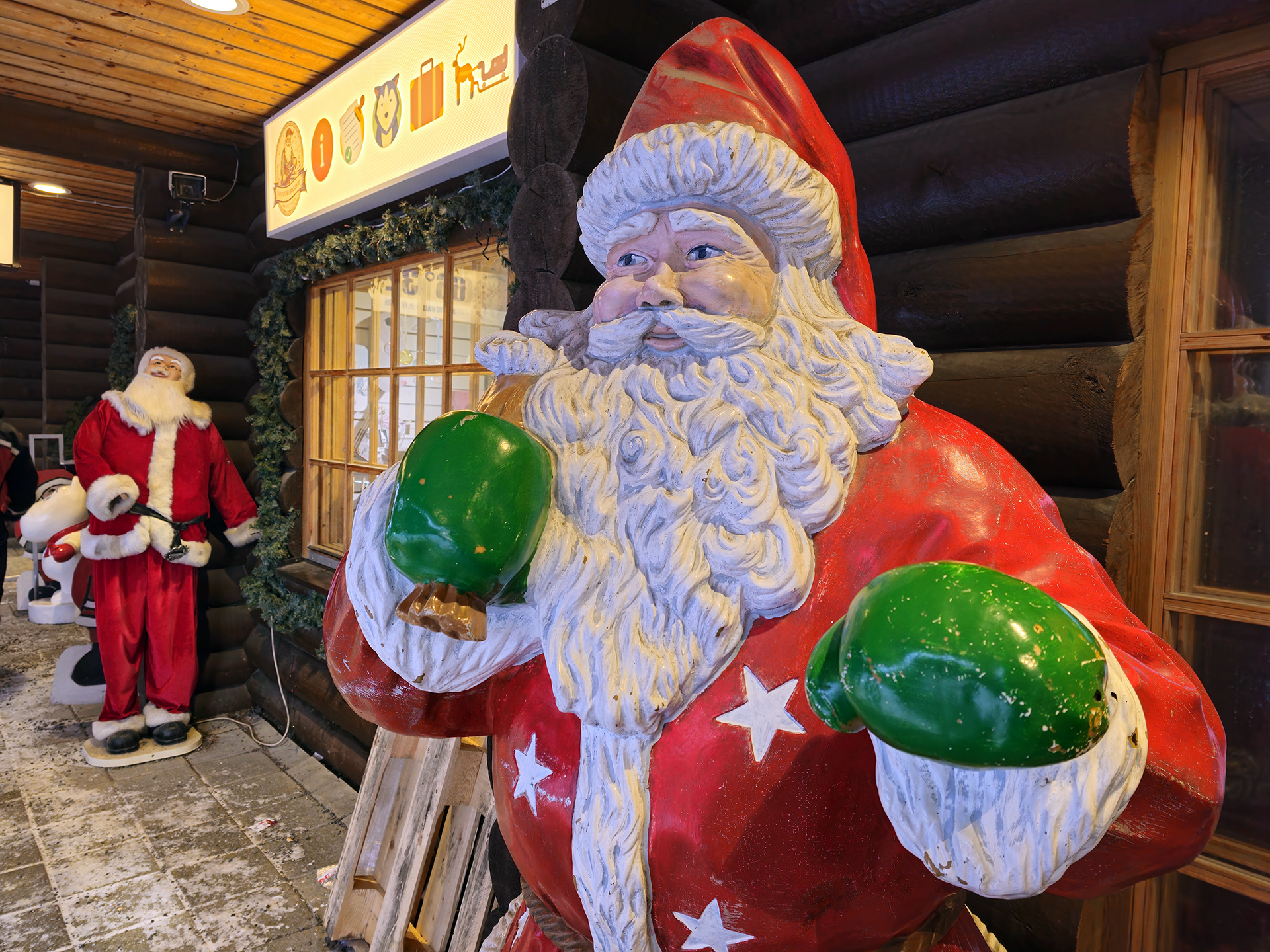
Santa Claus Village at Rovaniemi, Finland
