= Santa Claus' Main Post Office =

Turistic Attraction of Rovaniemi

Santa Claus Main Post Office Joulupukin Pääposti
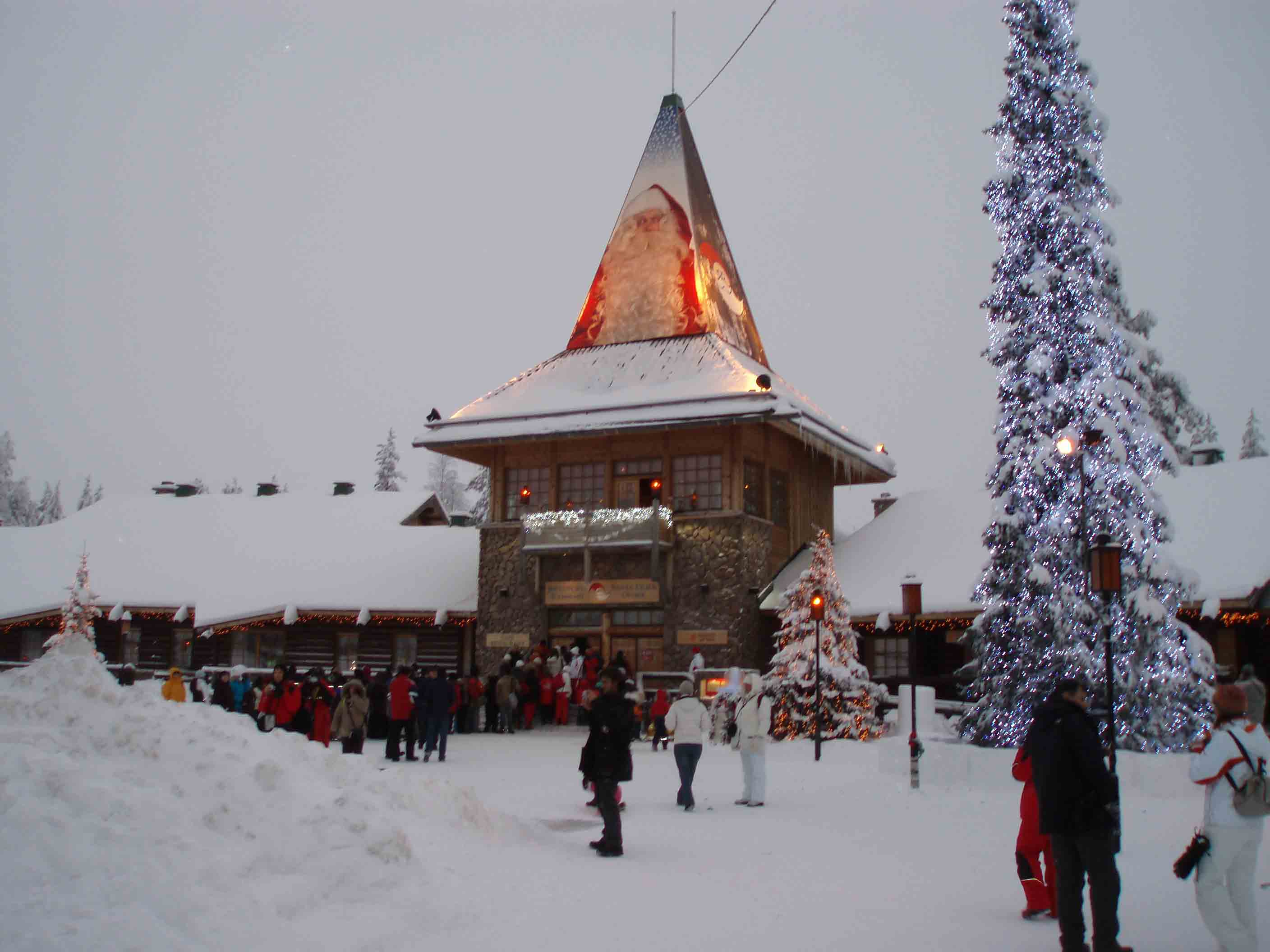
- Exterior view of the Post Office
- Interactive map of Santa Claus Main Post Office; Joulupukin Pääposti
- Location: Rovaniemi, Finland
- Coordinates: 66.543966°N 25.845279°E
- Opened: 1950

Santa Claus' Main Post Office (Finnish: Joulupukin Pääposti) is a tourist destination in Santa Claus Village in the Arctic Circle, about 8 km (5.0 mi) north of Rovaniemi. It is the only official Santa Claus´ Post Office and part of the Finnish postal services. It is open all year and over 100 international media and about half a million visitors from around the world are welcomed by Christmas-dressed postal elves. Santa Claus’ Main Post Office has received over 15 million letters from 198 countries since 1985. In 2014 Santa Claus received most letters from China, Italy and Poland. In Santa Claus' Main Post Office visitors can also read letters sent to Santa. A letter writer can arrange to have a letter mailed to them from Santa before Christmas.

== History ==
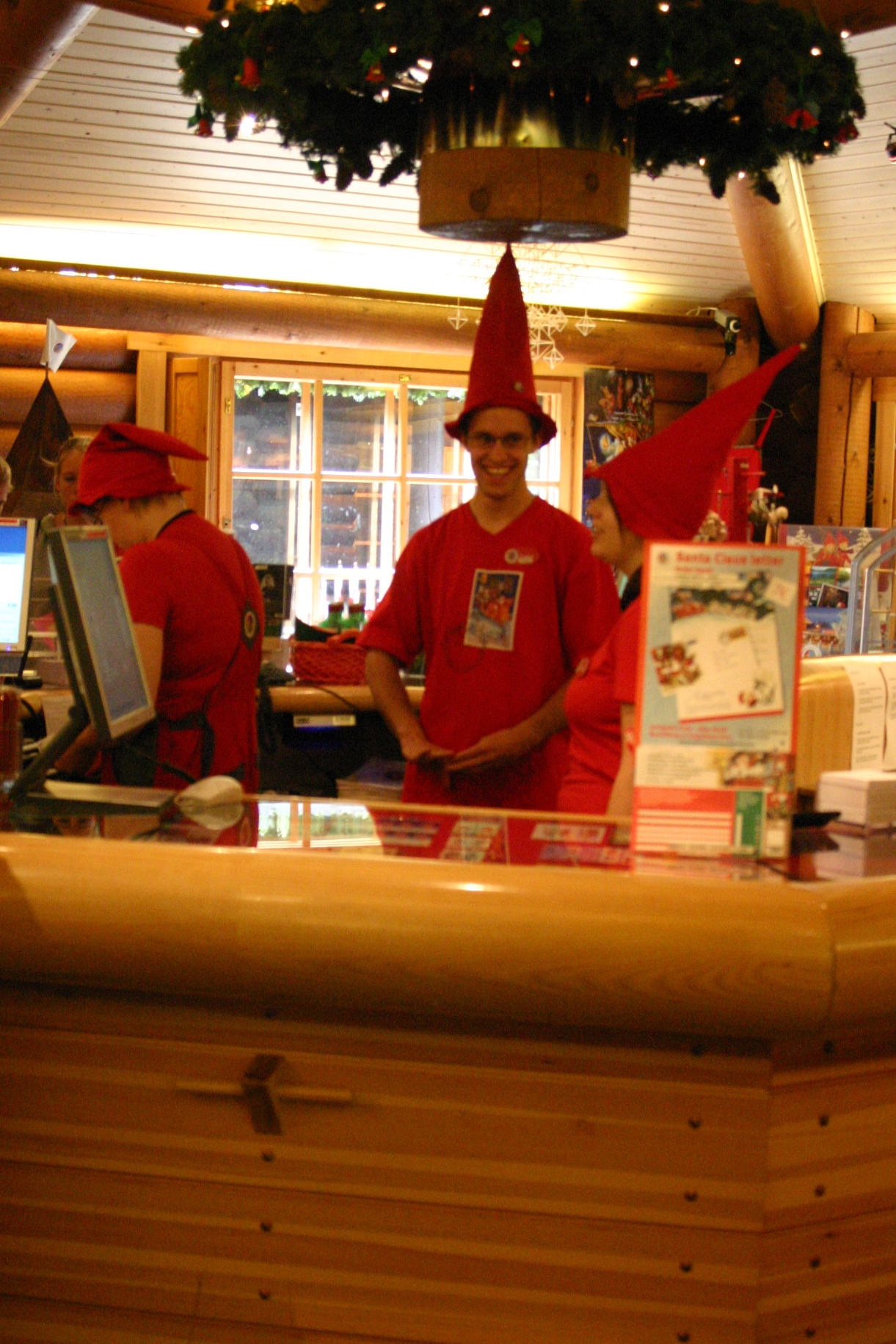
Elves at work inside the post office

The Santa Claus' Main Post Office building is made from natural stone and pine trees. In front of the building is Elf's tower. In 1950, Eleanor Roosevelt, the widow of Franklin D. Roosevelt, made a visit to Rovaniemi. Roosevelt Cottage was built to commemorate her mailing the first letter sent from within the Arctic Circle with a special stamp on November 6, 1950. The cottage is still in front of the Santa Claus' Main Post Office.

In December 2014, Google Street View photographed the interior of Santa Claus' Main Post Office as part of the Santa Claus Village to their Street View Special Collection.

== Arctic Circle special stamp ==
Each letter, card and parcel mailed at Santa Claus’ Main Post Office is franked with a special postmark and stamp. The logo of Santa Claus’ Main Post Office was designed by Finnish graphic designer Pekka Vuori. The logo is also a registered trademark. The postmark contains a stylized logo that was changed to its current form by graphic designer Jukka Talari in 2012. This special Arctic Circle postmark is a popular collectable and souvenir.
