= Santa Park =

Theme park in Rovaniemi, Finland

SantaPark
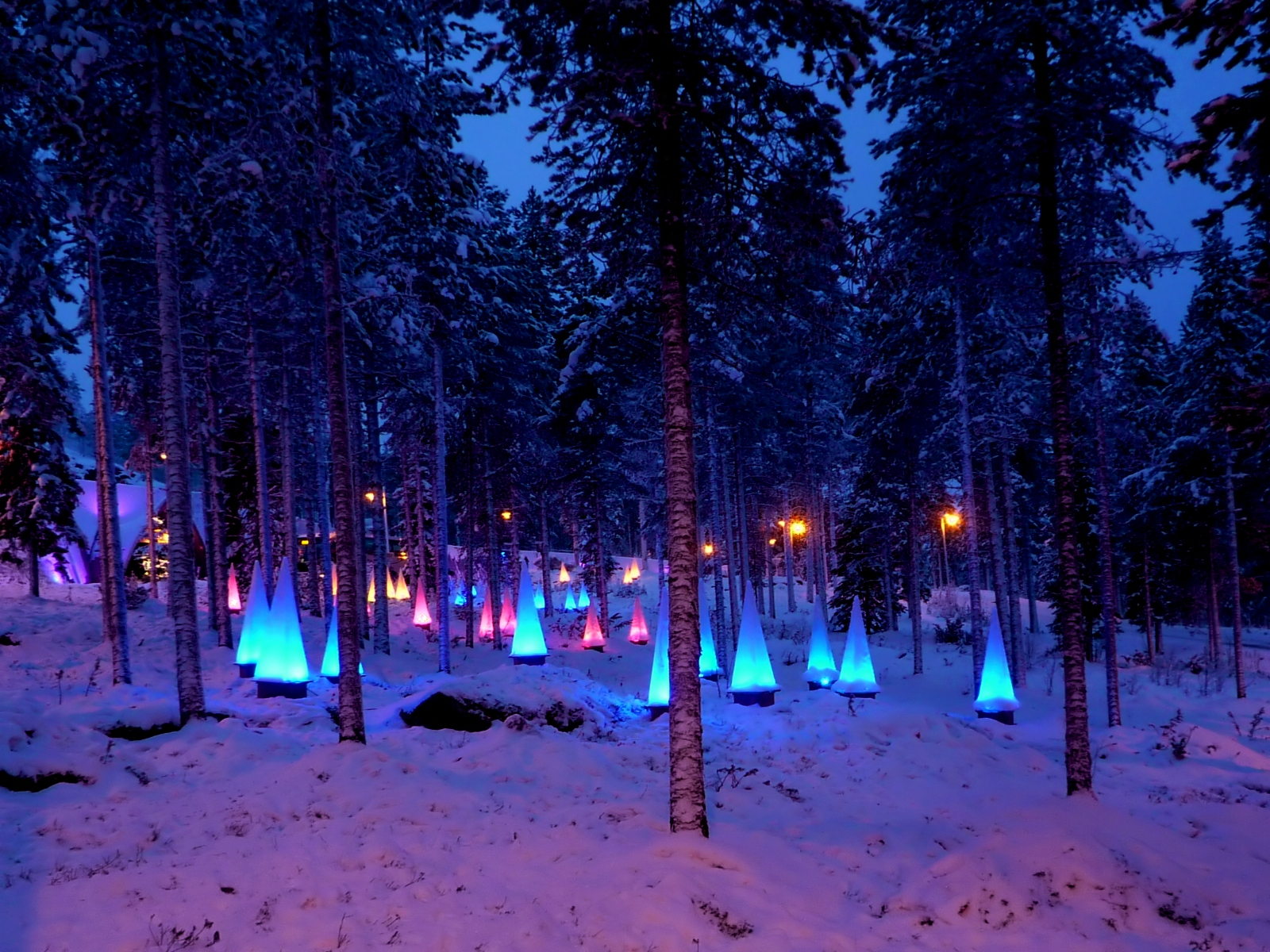
- Entrance to SantaPark in December 2010
- Interactive map of SantaPark
- Location: Rovaniemi, Finland
- Coordinates: 66°32′37″N 25°50′40″E
- Opened: 28 November 1998

SantaPark is a Christmas theme park and visitor attraction in Rovaniemi in the Lapland region of Finland. SantaPark was opened 28 November 1998.

== Theme ==
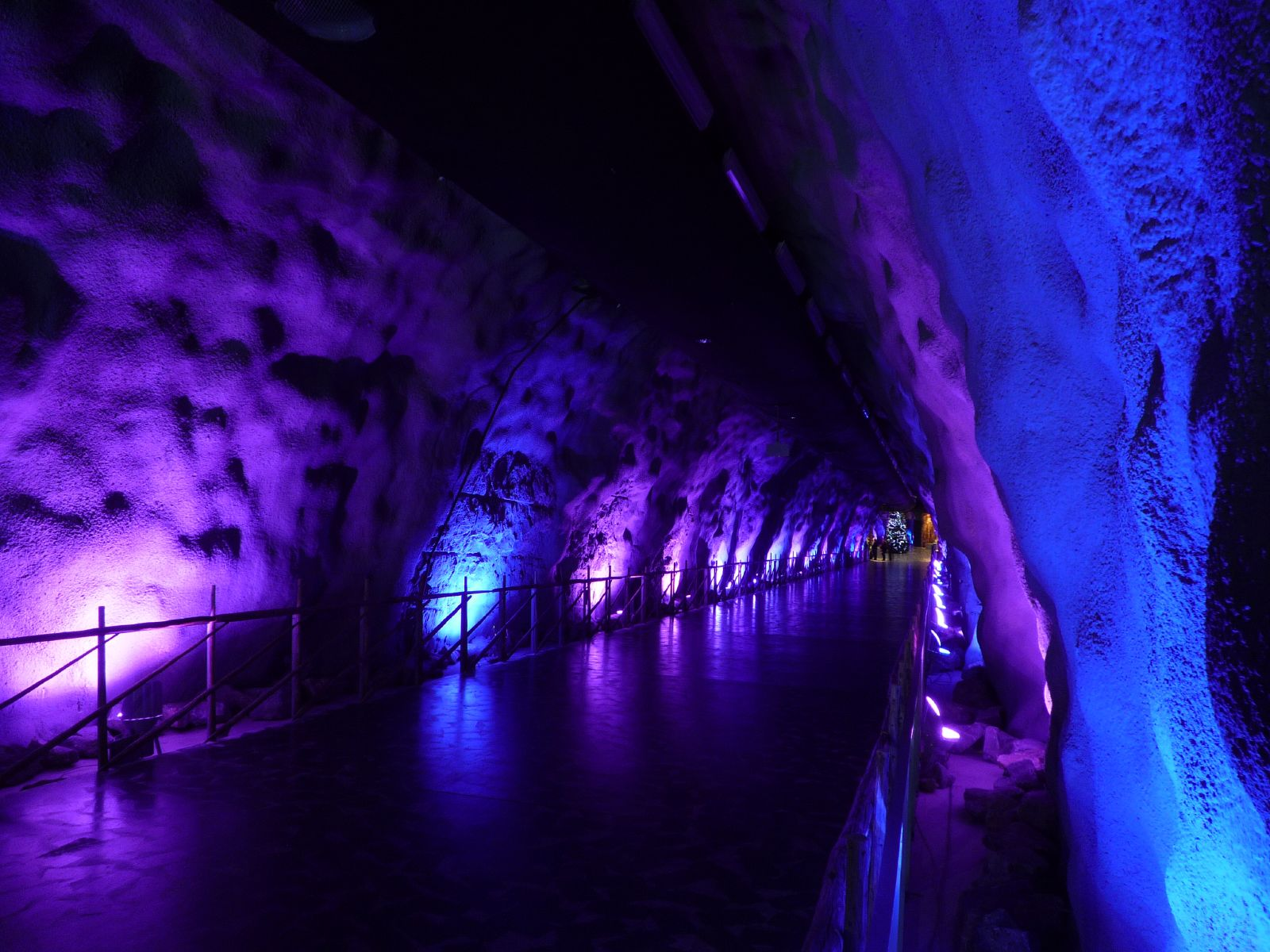
Illuminated underground tunnel in Santa Park

The park is designed to emulate the cavern residence of Santa Claus on the Arctic Circle. Popular culture often depicts Santa Claus (or joulupukki in Finnish) coming from Lapland. Therefore, tourists come every year to Rovaniemi to meet Santa Claus.

During summertime, it is open from the middle of June to the first weeks of August. In winter season the park is open from the late November to the beginning of January. There is an entrance fee for the park.

In SantaPark visitors can meet Santa Claus in his office and take pictures with him. Other attractions include Mrs. Gingerbread’s Gingerbread Bakery, the Ice Gallery, shows, cafeterias, workshops, and the Post Office, where it is possible to send postcards.

SantaPark is part of the SantaPark Arctic World brand, which also includes Santa Claus Secret Forest – Joulukka, Arctic Forest Spa – Metsäkyly, Lapland Luxury, Arctic TreeHouse Hotel, and Rakas Restaurant & Bar.

== History and the business concept ==
SantaPark was opened on 28 November 1998 as an amusement park. The concept was created by Santaworld Ltd. (UK) and the cost of construction was 6.7 million Euros. The ownership consisted of Finnish companies such as Finnair, MTV, Sampo, Lasten Päivän Säätiö, Posti. Ministry of Trade and Industry was also involved. As an amusement park Santa Park did not reach its financial goals. Renewal of the concept was attempted in 2002 with a new ownership structure where the municipality of Rovaniemi was involved. The new concept featured Santa Claus, Christmas and Lapland's culture and nature. On 24 March 2009 ownership was transferred to Santa's Holding Ltd. where the majority is held by Ilkka Länkinen and Katja Ikäheimo-Länkinen.

Currently another owner with shares of SantaPark is Lappset Group Oy. Former owners are Eero Sarin, Lasten Päivän Säätiö, Sampo Oyj, Tapsan Tapuli Oy, TeliaSonera Finland Oyj, MTV Oy and Lappish newspaper Lapin Kansa Oy. New owners Ilkka Länkinen and Katja-Ikäheimo Länkinen have announced that they will focus more in the sales and marketing of SantaPark.

== Attractions ==
The attractions of SantaPark include

- Christmas Magic Show
- Santa's Office
- Post Office
- Mrs. Gingerbread Bakery
- Magic Train
- Elf School
- Elf Workshop
- Post Office
- Undercrossing of the Arctic Circle
- Arktikum museum

Toy Factory Shopping Area and Kota Hut Cafe also serve customers.

== Architecture ==
The themepark is located in a cavern inside bedrock where visitors descend via a large portal. The space was originally designed as air-raid shelter.

== Location and transportation ==
SantaPark can be reached by car along the national highway 4. It is located about 9 km northeast of Rovaniemi and about 2 km from Rovaniemi Airport. Frequent flights from Helsinki and other cities to Rovaniemi are offered throughout the year. The majority of international tourists switch their plane at Helsinki-Vantaa airport. Also in the Christmas time there are many charter flights from Sweden, the United Kingdom and other countries that fly directly to Rovaniemi. Additionally there are Ryanair flights to Tampere which has regular connection to Rovaniemi as well. Finally there are regular bus and train connections to most major cities in Finland. Local transportation is provided by Santa's Express (bus line number 8) from the centre of Rovaniemi to SantaPark and Santa Claus Village. The bus trip to SantaPark takes about 15 minutes.

== See also ==
- Santa Claus Village
