= 1978 Finnish Air Force DC-3 crash =

1978 military aviation disaster in Rissala, Finland

Coordinates: 63.01°N 27.82°E

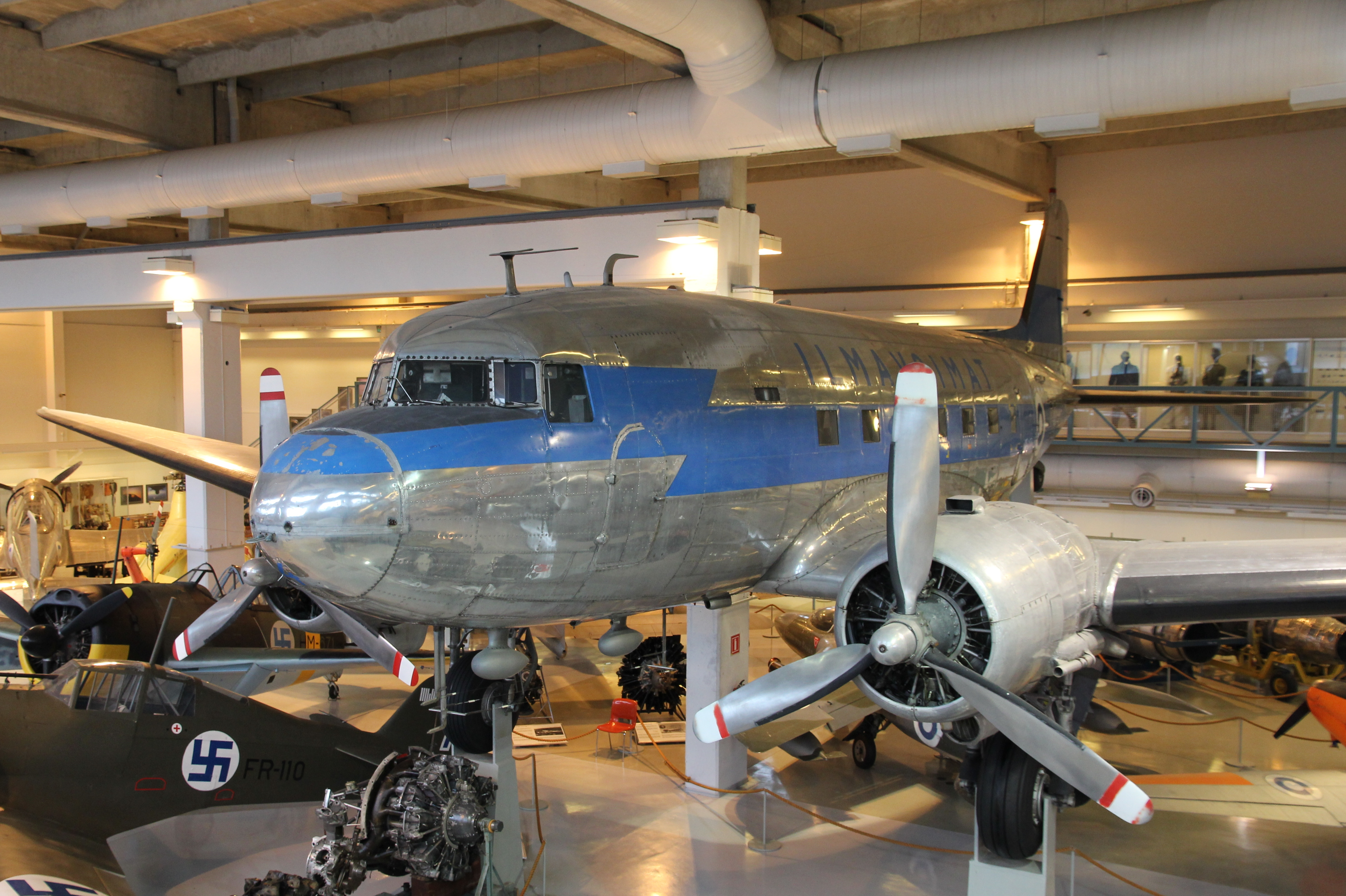
- Finnish Air Force C-47 DO-4, sister ship to the accident aircraft

Accident
- Date: 3 October 1978
- Summary: Engine failure, pilot error, stall
- Site: Rissala, Siilinjärvi, Finland

Aircraft
- Aircraft type: Douglas C-47A
- Operator: Finnish Air Force
- Registration: DO-10
- Flight origin: Utti Airport
- Stopover: Kuopio Airport
- Destination: Helsinki Airport
- Passengers: 12
- Crew: 3
- Fatalities: 15
- Survivors: 0

The Finnish Air Force DC-3 disaster occurred when a plane of this class crashed into Lake Juurusvesi in Rissala on 3 October 1978, killing all fifteen people on board. It was caused by a cracked exhaust valve, resulting from metal fatigue in an engine cylinder. Most of the victims were politicians and prominent businessmen attending a National Defence Course meeting organized by the Finnish Defence Forces.

The accident has been the third worst aviation accident in Finland, and the worst involving a Finnish Air Force aircraft.

== Incident ==
After the airplane departed Kuopio Airport at 21:31 local time, one of its engines lost power. The pilot attempted to return to the airport, but during the turn, the aircraft lost altitude and impacted Lake Juurusvesi. This happened only seconds after the pilot, Kari Halmetoja, had informed the flight control about the problem. The weather was very windy at the time.

== Aircraft ==
The aircraft involved, with Finnish Air Force serial number DO-10, was originally a Douglas C-47A-1-DK transport aircraft, USAAF serial number 42-92268. Built by the Douglas Aircraft Corporation in Oklahoma City in 1943, it initially served in the CBI theatre in World War II, and was transferred to the RAF in January 1944 with serial number FL626. Aero purchased the aircraft in September 1955, and it was converted into a cargo plane in 1961. It was sold to the Finnish Air Force in 1970 and served as a paratrooper transport plane. It also participated in filming the motion picture A Bridge Too Far in 1976.

== Investigation ==
The primary cause of the accident was found to be mechanical failure resulting from a fatigue breakdown in one of the cylinders of the right-side engine, which resulted in cracking of an exhaust valve. The airplane had been maintained and was checked the previous day, but the crack would only have been visible by partially disassembling the engine.

There was no flight recorder on board so no technical investigation of the pilots' actions could be made, but the official investigation determined that the pilot had likely turned too steeply because it should be possible to bring a plane of this type back with just one engine. The investigation board also speculated that the attention of the crew was concentrated on the engine failure instead of flying with one engine, possibly due to carrying out engine fire drills.

== Aftermath ==
The accident hastened by two years the replacement of the aging DC-3 fleet of the Finnish Air Force with Fokker F.27s. Air force and Finnair pilots were also given more training for emergency situations and flying in challenging wind conditions.

A memorial was later erected at Utti Airport, where the flight originally took off.

Among the victims were three sitting members of the Parliament of Finland: Olavi Majlander, Arto Merisaari, and Kirsti Hollming.

Tarja Halonen, the future President of Finland, then lawyer for the Central Organisation of Finnish Trade Unions, would have been a passenger on the flight had her doctor not advised her not to fly, due to her late-stage pregnancy. MP Kirsti Hollming on the other hand was not supposed to be on the plane, but a speech she held in Kuopio was delayed and she was offered an opportunity to take the flight home.

== See also ==
- Aero Flight 311
- Aero Flight 217
- National Accident Day (Finland)
