= Joensuu Airport =

Joensuu Airport Joensuun lentoasema

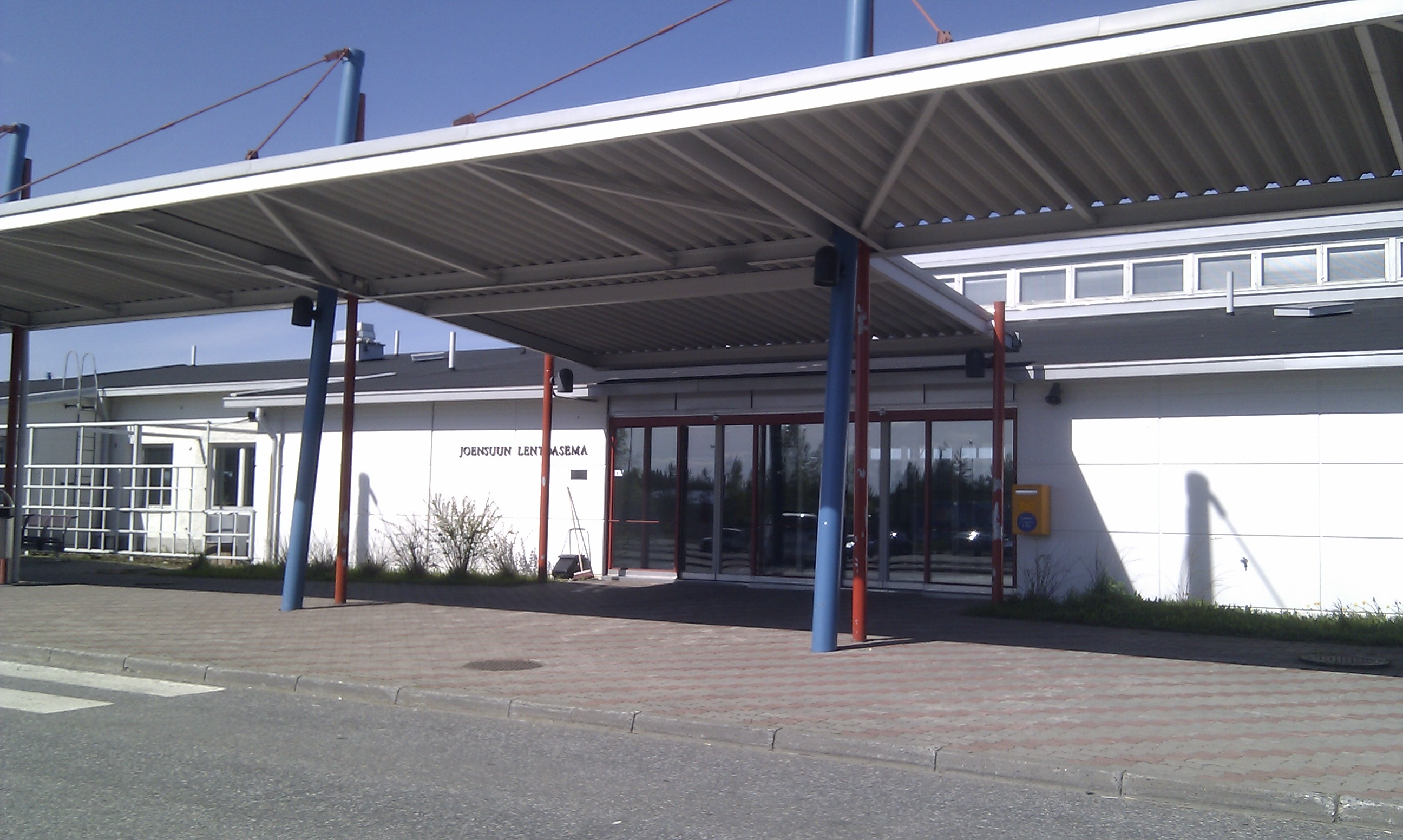
- IATA: JOE; ICAO: EFJO

Summary
- Airport type: Public
- Operator: Finavia
- Serves: Joensuu
- Location: Liperi, Finland
- Elevation AMSL: 399 ft (122 m)
- Coordinates: 62°39′32″N 029°37′28″E
- Website: finavia.fi

Map
- Location within Finland

Runways
Direction	Length		Surface
Direction	m	ft	Surface
10/28	2,500	8,202	Asphalt

Statistics (2015)
- Passengers: 133,726
- Source: AIP Finland; Statistics from Finavia

Joensuu Airport (IATA: JOE, ICAO: EFJO) is an airport in Liperi, Finland, about 11 kilometres (7 mi) northwest of the city centre of Joensuu.

== History ==
The airport was established in 1937.

== Airlines and destinations ==
The following airlines operate regular scheduled and charter flights at Joensuu Airport:

Airlines	Destinations
Finnair	Helsinki

== Statistics ==
Annual passenger statistics for Joensuu Airport
Year	Domestic	International	Total	Change
2004	157,022	6,813	163,835	+3.2% ▲
2005	144,917	8,972	153,889	−6.1% ▼
2006	139,299	7,340	146,639	−4.7% ▼
2007	132,436	10,836	143,272	−2.3% ▼
2008	124,835	9,439	134,274	−6.3% ▼
2009	113,895	8,846	122,741	−8.6% ▼
2010	108,618	10,143	118,761	−3.2% ▼
2011	108,704	8,410	117,114	−1.4% ▼
2012	130,006	16,191	146,197	+28.4% ▲
2013	118,084	13,207	131,291	−10.2% ▼
2014	125,082	13,137	138,219	+5.3% ▲
2015	121,281	12,445	133,726	−3.3% ▼
2016	112,454	10,089	122,543	−8.4% ▼
2017	110,666	9,048	119,714	−2.3% ▼
2018	111,144	10,410	121,554	+1.5% ▲
2019	112,564	14,049	126,613	+4.2% ▲
2020	21,038	916	21,954	−82.7% ▼
2021	8,923	167	9,090	−58.6% ▼
2022	15,984	3,070	19,054	+109.6% ▲
2023	38,118	2,522	40,640	+113.3% ▲
2024	36,544	3,412	39,956	−1.7% ▼
2025	38,746	2,556	41,302	+3.4% ▲

== Weather station ==
The Finnish Meteorological Institute has a weather station at the airport. The highest recorded natural temperature in Finland, 37.2 °C (99.0 °F), was measured at the airport on 29 July 2010.

== Ground transportation ==
=== Bus ===
Route 6, operated by Joensuu Region Public Transport, operates between the airport and the city centre according to flight schedules.

== See also ==
- List of the largest airports in the Nordic countries
- Joensuu railway station
