= Arto Merisaari =

Finnish jurist and politician (1940–1978)

Arto Allan Merisaari (18 March 1940 – 3 October 1978) was a Finnish jurist and politician.

== Life and Death ==
He was born in Aura, 1940. He was a member of the Parliament of Finland from 1975. He represented the Finnish People's Democratic League (SKDL). He was a presidential elector in the 1978 Finnish presidential election.

He died in the 1978 Finnish Air Force DC-3 crash.
