= Finavia =

Finnish airport operator

Finavia Oyj
- Type: Public Limited Liability Company
- Industry: Airport operation
- Founded: 1991
- Headquarters: Helsinki-Vantaa Airport; Vantaa, Finland; 60°18′56″N 024°57′55″E
- Area served: Finland
- Key people: Kimmo Mäki (CEO)
- Revenue: ▼€373.6 million (2017)
- Operating income: ▲€60.0 million (2017)
- Net income: ▲€37.7 million (2017)
- Owner: Finnish state 100%
- Number of employees: ▼1,181 (2017)
- Website: www.finavia.fi

Finavia's Airports in Finland

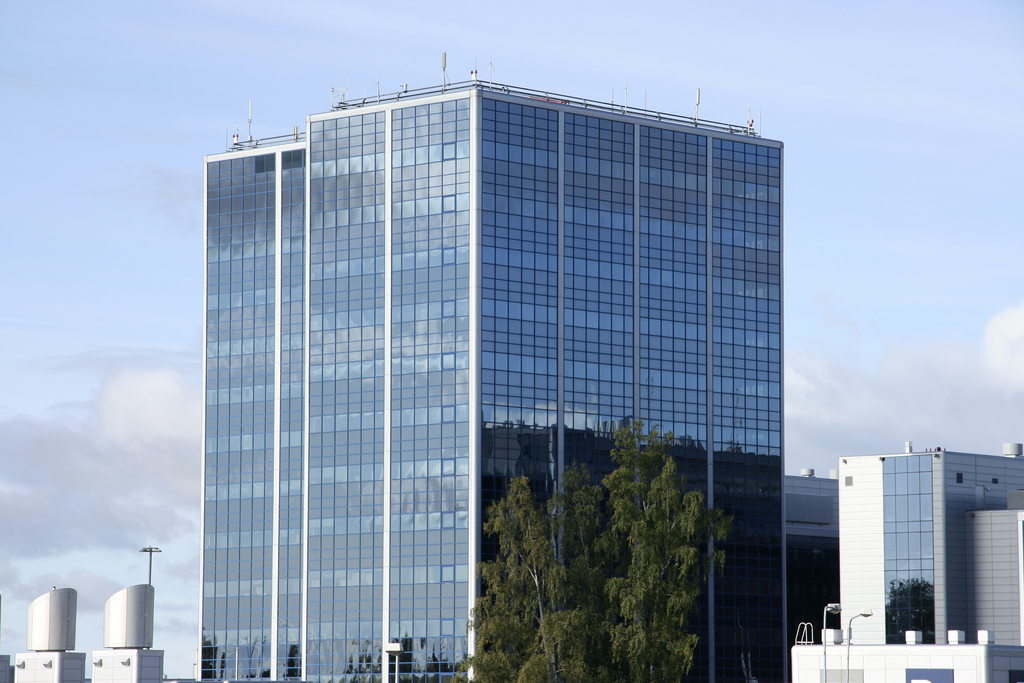
Finavia head office

Finavia Oyj, formerly the Finnish Civil Aviation Administration, is the public limited company responsible for maintaining and developing Finland's airport network. Finavia manages and develops 20 airports around the country, 18 of which primarily serve commercial flights and 2 of which focus solely on military and general aviation. Finavia is owned by the Finnish Government.

Finavia's headquarters are located on the grounds of Helsinki Airport. Kimmo Mäki started as Finavia's CEO January 1, 2018. The Prime Minister's Office is responsible for Finavia's ownership steering and oversight.

In 2023, 18,3 million passengers used Finavia's airports, with Helsinki Airport, Finavia's main airport, constituting 15.3 million of those. Helsinki Airport is an important transfer hub in Northern Europe, especially for Asian transfer passengers.

== Operations ==
Finavia's customers are airlines, other operators in the sector, as well as passengers. Finavia's main business units are Helsinki Airport and the airport network in Finland. Finavia's daughter company is Airpro Oy, a company providing ground services for airports and airlines.

Finavia's main services for airlines and passengers are:

- Airports: airport services, maintenance of runways and terminals, ramp handling and security check services.
- Ground services and security check services for air traffic (through Airpro Oy).

Finavia used to also take care of Finland's air navigation, which was separated as its own business for Air Navigation Services Finland in the beginning of April, 2017

== Network ==
The airport network supported and developed by Finavia is composed of 20 airports in Finland. Finavia's largest civilian airport by number of passengers is Helsinki Airport (15.3 million passengers in 2023).

Finavia maintains 20 airports in Finland:

- Helsinki Airport (HEL)
- Oulu Airport (OUL)
- Rovaniemi Airport (RVN)
- Turku Airport (TKU)
- Vaasa Airport (VAA)
- Kittilä Airport (KTT)
- Tampere Airport (TMP)
- Kuopio Airport (KUO)
- Ivalo Airport (IVL)
- Joensuu Airport (JOE)
- Jyväskylä Airport (JYV)
- Kajaani Airport (KAJ)
- Kokkola-Pietarsaari Airport (KOK)
- Mariehamn Airport (MHQ)
- Savonlinna Airport (SVL)
- Pori Airport (POR)
- Kemi-Tornio Airport (KEM)
- Kuusamo Airport (KAO)
- Halli Airport (KEV)
- Utti Airport (UTI)

== Snow removal ==
Finavia's airports are recognized for their snow removal capacity and expertise on dealing with harsh snow conditions at airports. Finavia invests especially in the 24/7 availability of winter weather and airfield maintenance. The unusually large snowfalls in the winter of 2010–2011 in Europe brought chaos to many airports in Central Europe, with many airports shutting down temporarily. Despite these snowfalls, Finavia's airports remained operational throughout the entire winter. Finavia and Helsinki Airport's snow removal abilities have also been recognized by other European airport operators.

== Use of artificial intelligence ==
Finavia has also been recognized for the use of artificial intelligence and data in its airports. Finavia has partnered with the Finnish technology company Reaktor, using passenger data to mathematically build aircraft parking plans to make the airport customer experience smoother and ease rush. In one case, Kittilä Airport struggled with only 12 parking lots, and high seasonal variation in passenger numbers, and using the new system they were able to cut delays by 61 percent. The use of AI at Helsinki Airport was named one of the Top 10 transportation innovations of 2018 by Monocle magazine.

== See also ==
- List of the largest airports in the Nordic countries
