= Savonlinna Airport =

Savonlinna Airport Savonlinnan lentoasema

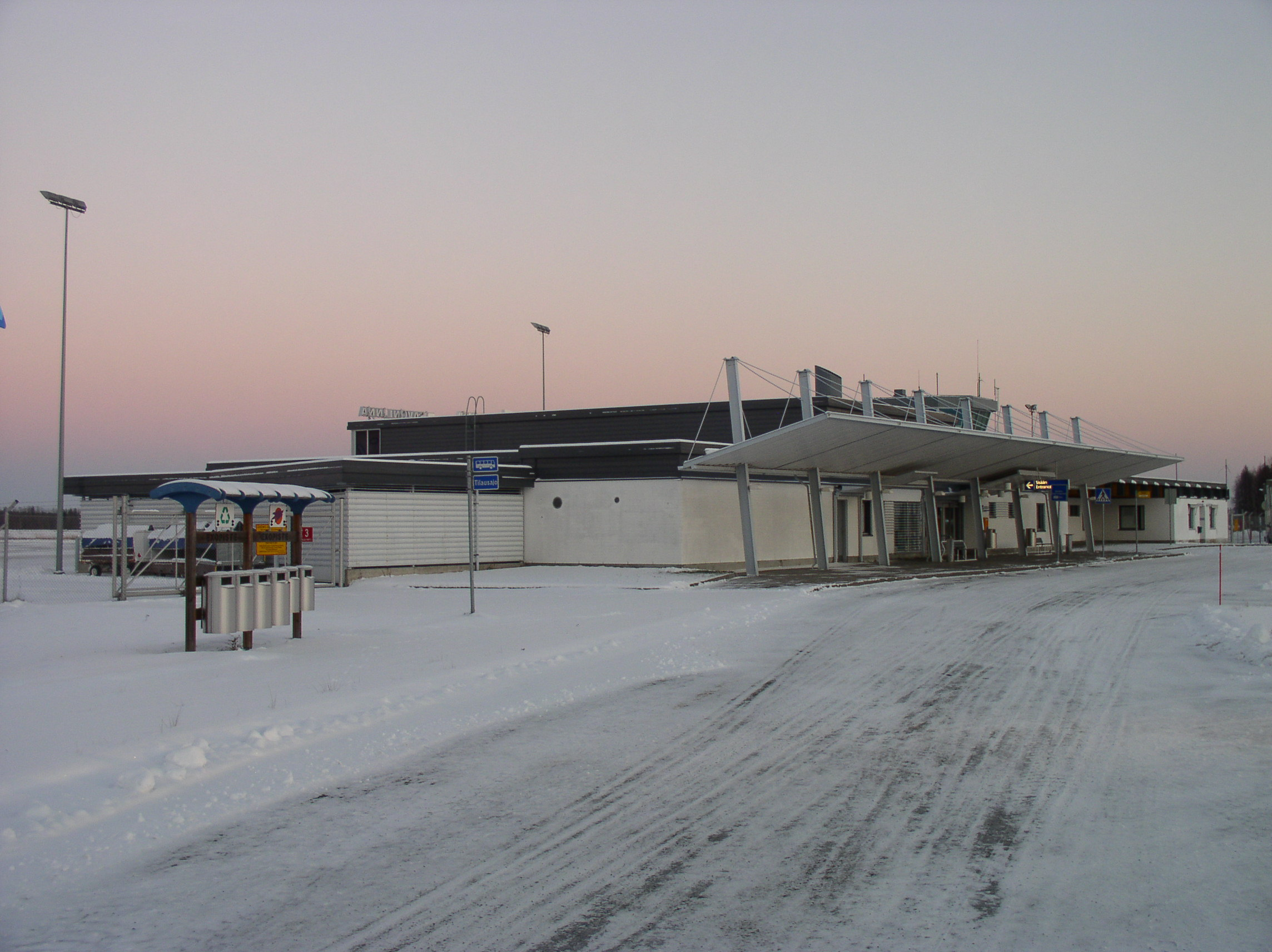
- IATA: SVL; ICAO: EFSA

Summary
- Airport type: Public
- Operator: Finavia
- Location: Savonlinna, Finland
- Elevation AMSL: 95 m (312 ft)
- Coordinates: 61°56′34″N 028°56′42″E
- Website: www.finavia.fi/...

Map
- Location within Finland

Runways
Direction	Length		Surface
Direction	m	ft	Surface
12/30	2,300	7,546	Asphalt

Statistics (2010)
- Passengers: 15,899
- Landings: 840
- Source: AIP Finland; Statistics from Finavia

Savonlinna Airport (IATA: SVL, ICAO: EFSA) in Finland is about 15 kilometres (9 mi) north of Savonlinna town centre along the Enonkoskentie road. It has a single asphalt runway, two gates, one with a waiting area fitted with seats, and a cafeteria. Its busiest times are during the Savonlinna Opera Festival when there are more scheduled and charter flights to the airport.

== Airlines and destinations ==
The following airlines operate regular scheduled and charter flights at Savonlinna Airport:

Airlines	Destinations
BASe Airlines	Helsinki
Discover Airlines	Seasonal: Frankfurt (begins 19 June 2027)

== Statistics ==
Annual passenger statistics for Savonlinna Airport
Year	Domestic passengers	International passengers	Total passengers	Change
2005	19,145	2,199	21,344	−32.1% ▼
2006	21,305	2,424	23,729	+11.2% ▲
2007	17,558	1,774	19,332	−18.5% ▼
2008	12,425	2,781	15,206	−21.3% ▼
2009	14,630	3,179	17,809	+17.1% ▲
2010	13,007	2,892	15,899	−10.7% ▼
2011	12,002	2,173	14,175	−10.8% ▼
2012	10,671	2,535	13,206	−6.8% ▼
2013	9,497	2,718	12,215	−7.5% ▼
2014	7,261	3,197	10,458	−14.4% ▼
2015	11,002	2,531	13,533	+29.4% ▲
2016	9,881	1,719	11,600	-14.3% ▼
2017	9,548	2,861	12,409	7.0% ▲
2018	7,626	3,129	10,757	-13.3% ▼
2019	7,130	3,365	10,495	-2.4% ▼
2020	1,200	2	1,202	-88.5% ▼
2021	512	48	560	-53.4% ▼
2022	2,387	724	3,111	455.5% ▲
2023	2,116	861	2,977	-4.3% ▼
2024	5,358	1,755	7,113	138.9% ▲
2025	6,100	692	6,792	-4.5% ▼

== See also ==
- List of the busiest airports in the Nordic countries
