= Utti Air Base =

Utti Air Base Utin lentoasema
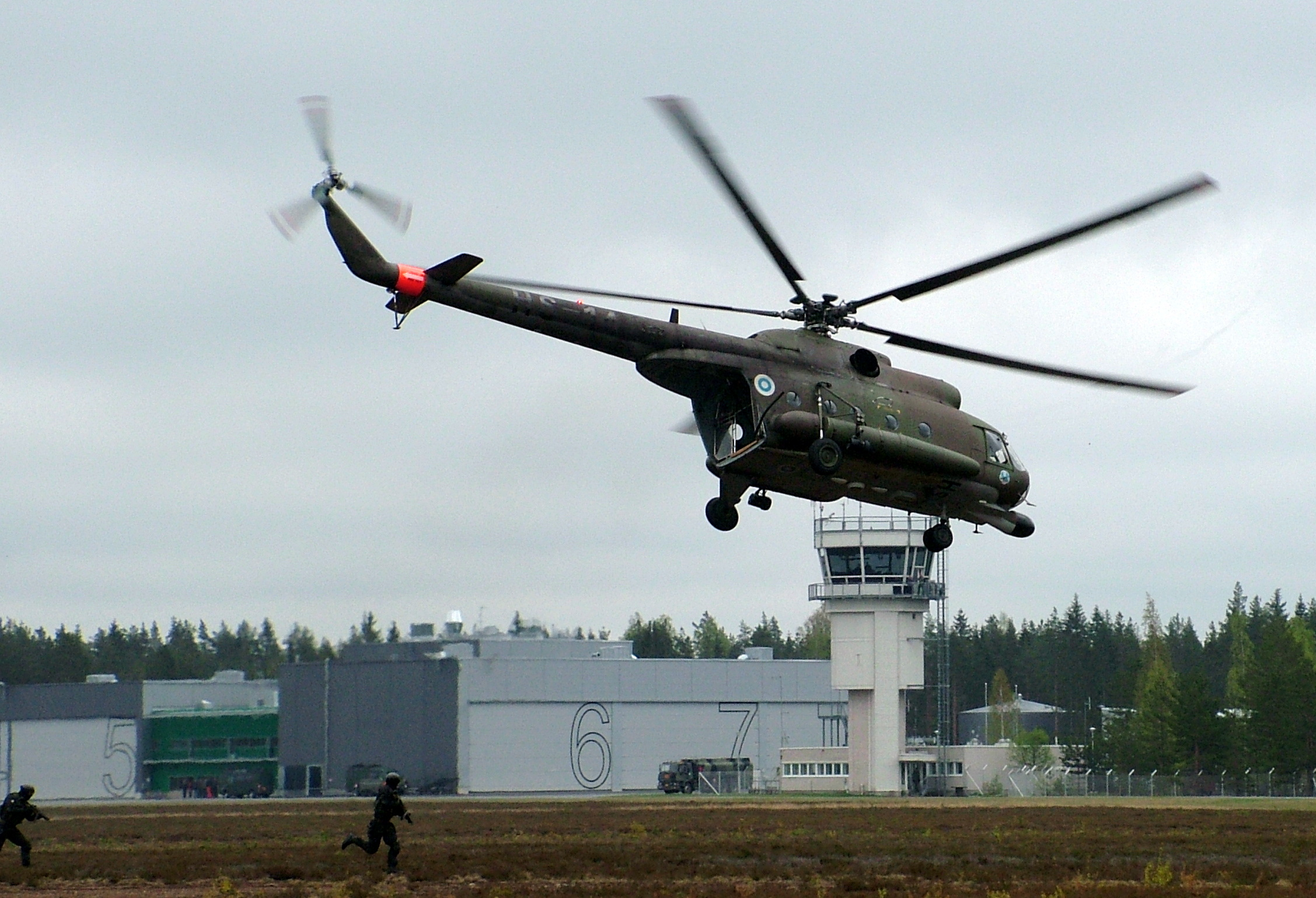
- Mil Mi-8 helicopter of the Finnish Army at the airport
- IATA: UTI; ICAO: EFUT

Summary
- Airport type: Military
- Operator: Finavia, Finnish Defence Forces
- Location: Kouvola, Finland
- Elevation AMSL: 103 m / 339 ft
- Coordinates: 60°53′47″N 026°56′17″E

Map
- Location within Finland

Runways
Direction	Length		Surface
Direction	m	ft	Surface
07/25	2,000	6,562	Asphalt

Statistics (2010)
- Passengers: 14
- Landings: 2,868
- Source: AIP Finland; Statistics from Finavia

Utti Air Base (IATA: UTI, ICAO: EFUT) (Finnish: Utin lentoasema) is a military airport located in Utti, Kouvola, Finland, 7 nautical miles (13 km; 8 mi) east of Kouvola city centre. The helicopter battalion of the Utti Jaeger Regiment is based here.

== See also ==
- List of the largest airports in the Nordic countries
