= Helsinki Airport =

Airport in Finland

Helsinki-Vantaa Airport Helsinki-Vantaan lentoasema Helsingfors-Vanda flygplats

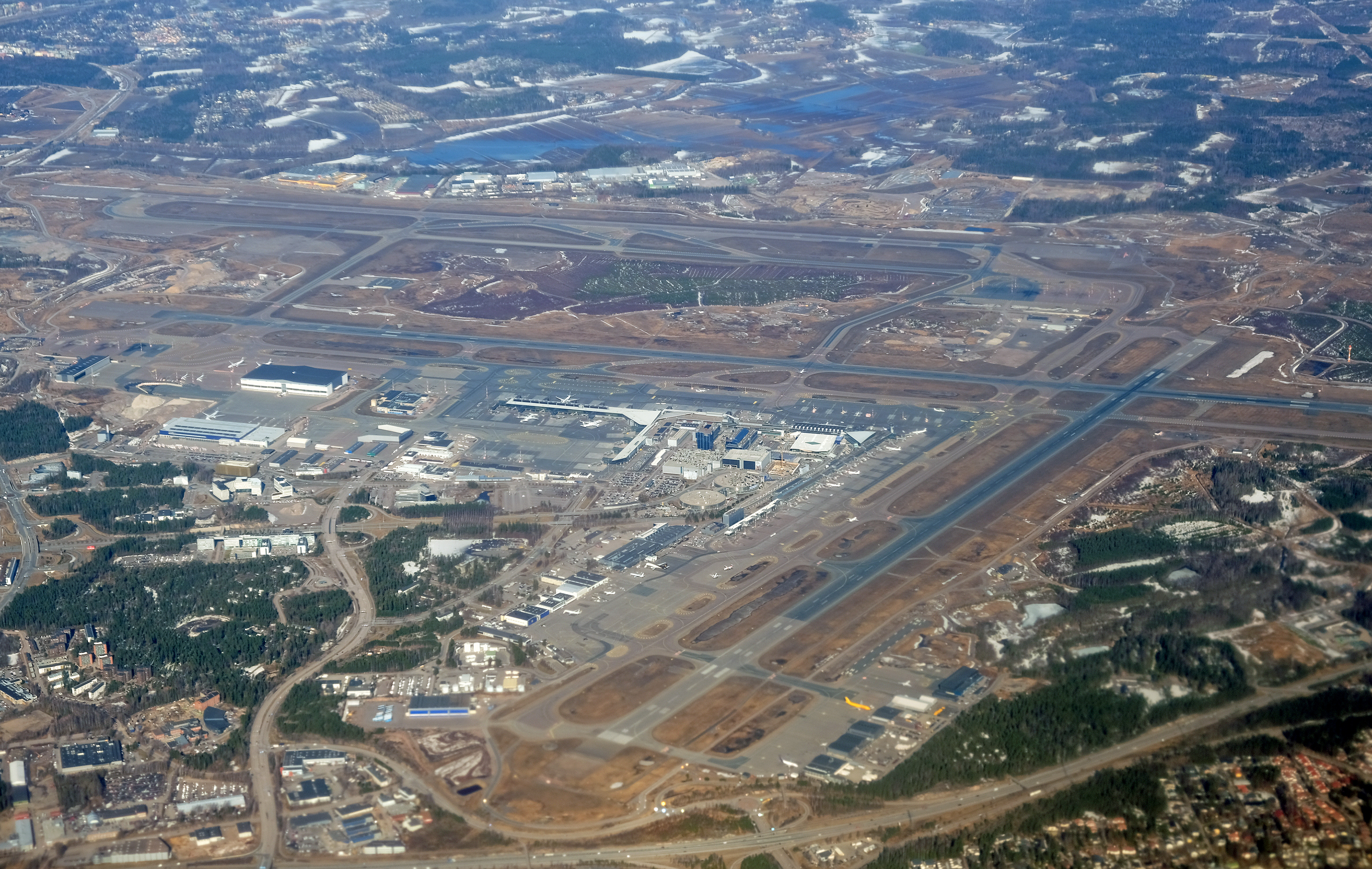
- IATA: HEL; ICAO: EFHK

Summary
- Airport type: Public
- Owner/Operator: Finavia
- Serves: Helsinki metropolitan area
- Location: Aviapolis, Vantaa, Finland
- Opened: July 1952; 74 years ago
- Hub for: Finnair; Norra
- Operating base for: Norwegian Air Shuttle
- Elevation AMSL: 55 m (180 ft)
- Coordinates: 60°19′02″N 024°57′48″E
- Website: www.finavia.fi/en/airports/helsinki-airport

Map
- Location within Finland HEL/EFHK (Scandinavia) HEL/EFHK (Europe)

Runways
Direction	Length		Surface
Direction	m	ft	Surface
04R/22L	3,500	11,483	Asphalt
04L/22R	3,060	10,039	Asphalt
15/33	2,901	9,518	Asphalt

Helipads
Number	Length		Surface
Number	m	ft	Surface
H16/H34	310	1,017	Asphalt

Statistics (2025)
- Passengers: 16,980,287
- Passenger change 2024–25: ▲4.1%
- Aircraft movements: 152,837
- Movement change 2024–25: ▲1.8%
- Cargo (metric tonnes): 184,004
- Cargo change 2024–25: ▲0.9%

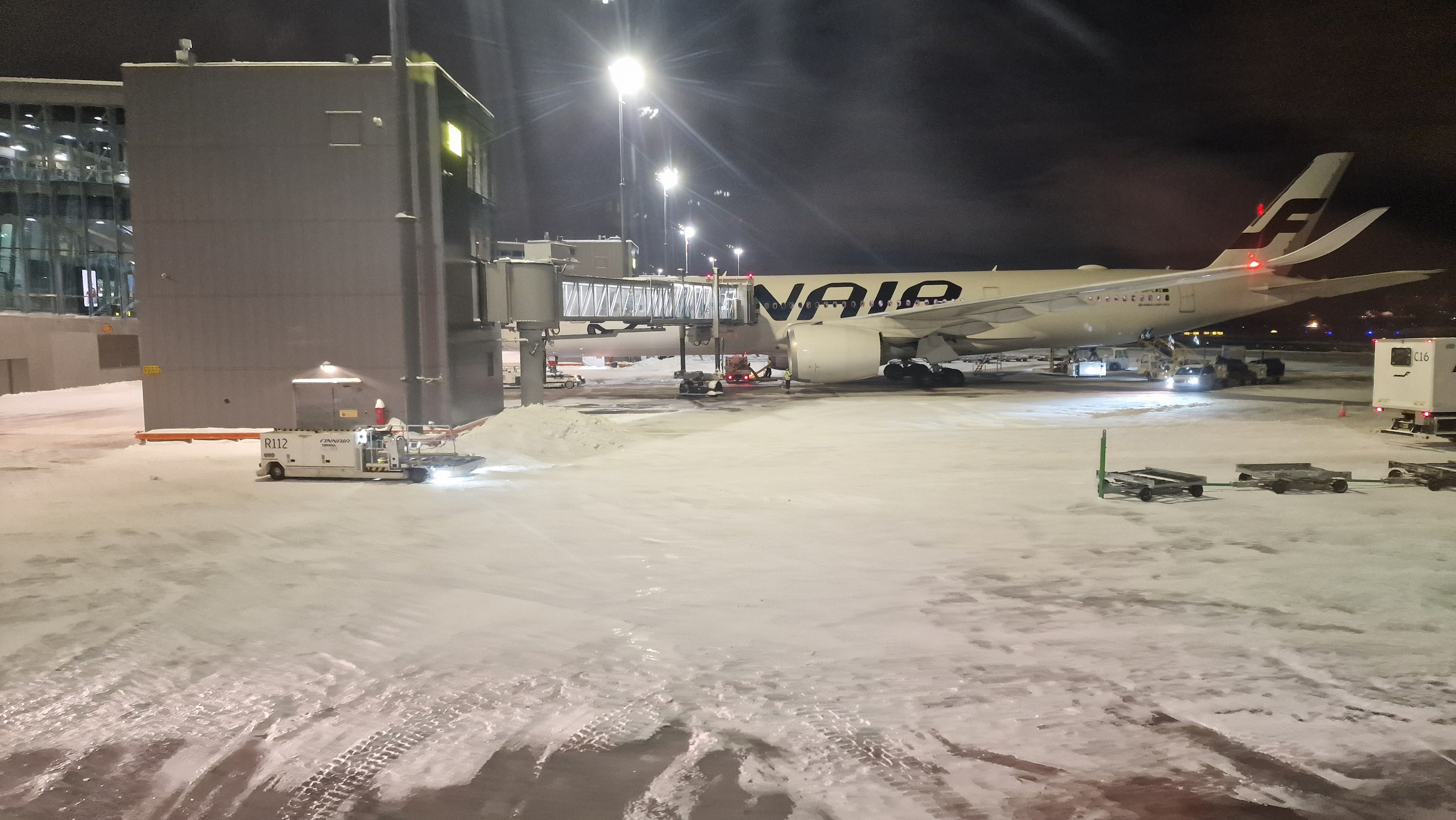
Helsinki Airport deals with significant snow and ice.

Helsinki-Vantaa Airport (Finnish: Helsinki-Vantaan lentoasema, Swedish: Helsingfors-Vanda flygplats) (IATA: HEL, ICAO: EFHK), or simply Helsinki Airport, is the main international airport serving Helsinki, the capital of Finland, as well as its surrounding metropolitan area, and the Uusimaa region in Finland. The airport is located in the neighbouring city of Vantaa, about 5 kilometres (3 mi) west of Tikkurila, the administrative centre of Vantaa and 9.2 NM (17.0 km; 10.6 mi) north of Helsinki's city centre. The airport is operated by state-owned Finavia. The facility covers a total of 1,800 hectares (4,448 acres) of land and contains three runways.

The airport is by far the busiest in Finland (with 20 times the traffic of the next-busiest, Rovaniemi) and the fourth busiest in the Nordic countries in terms of passenger numbers. About 90% of Finland's international air traffic passes through Helsinki Airport. In 2025, Helsinki Airport had nearly 17 million passengers, 89% of whom were international passengers and 11% domestic passengers. On average, the airport handles around 350 departures a day.

The airport is the main hub for Finnair, the flag carrier of Finland, and its subsidiary Nordic Regional Airlines. It is also an operating base for Norwegian Air Shuttle. As of October 2025, the airport has around 20 regularly operating airlines and more than 100 direct routes, of which around 80 are intra-European and 25 intercontinental routes to Africa, Asia, the Middle East, and North America.

Originally built for the 1952 Summer Olympics in Helsinki, the airport today provides jobs for 25,000 people and 1,500 companies operate at the airport.

Helsinki Airport has historically been a major transit hub between Europe and Asia. However, its role as a key transfer point has been constrained by the closure of Russian airspace in 2022, which forced airlines to reroute flights and lengthen connections. Despite the closure, Helsinki Airport recorded 2,299,243 international transfer passengers in 2025, which represents an increase of around 10.6 % compared with 2024, showing recovery in long-haul services and transfer activity.

Helsinki Airport's minimum transit time of 35 minutes is among the shortest in Europe. According to Finavia's survey, as many as one in every three passengers select their flight route based on the transit airport.

== History ==
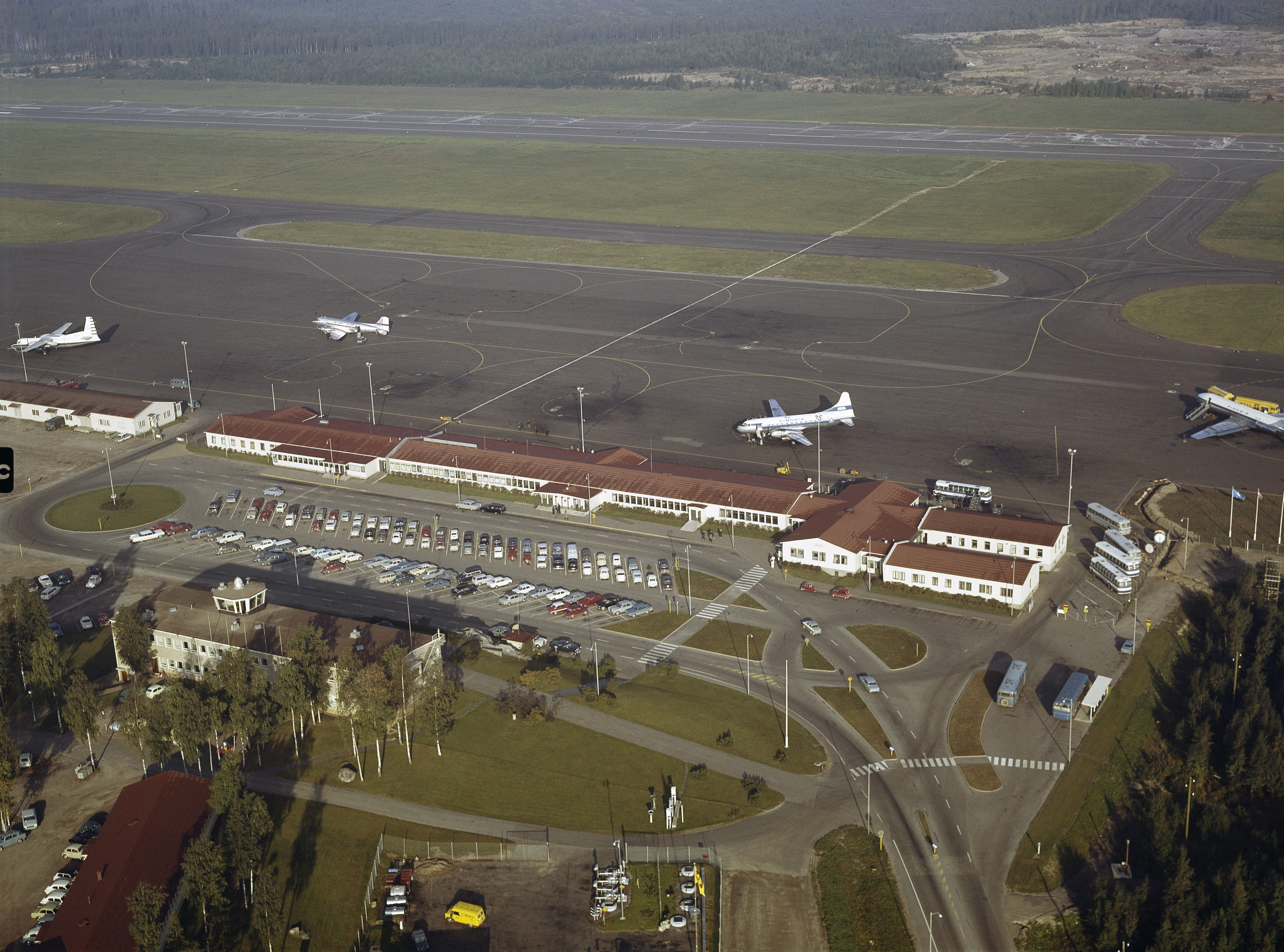
Aerial photo of the first terminal at Helsinki Airport in 1963/1964

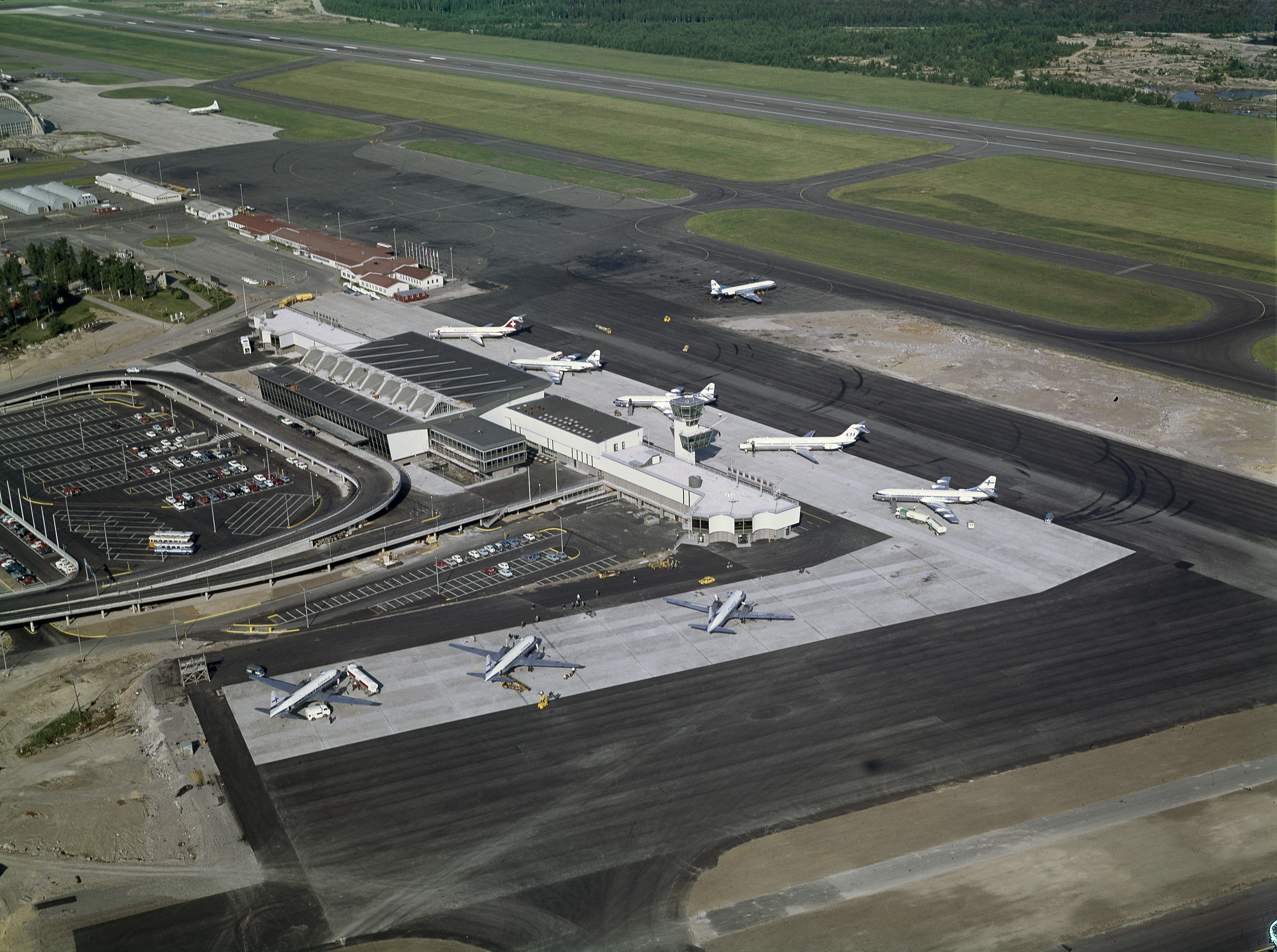
Aerial photo of Helsinki Airport terminal area in 1969

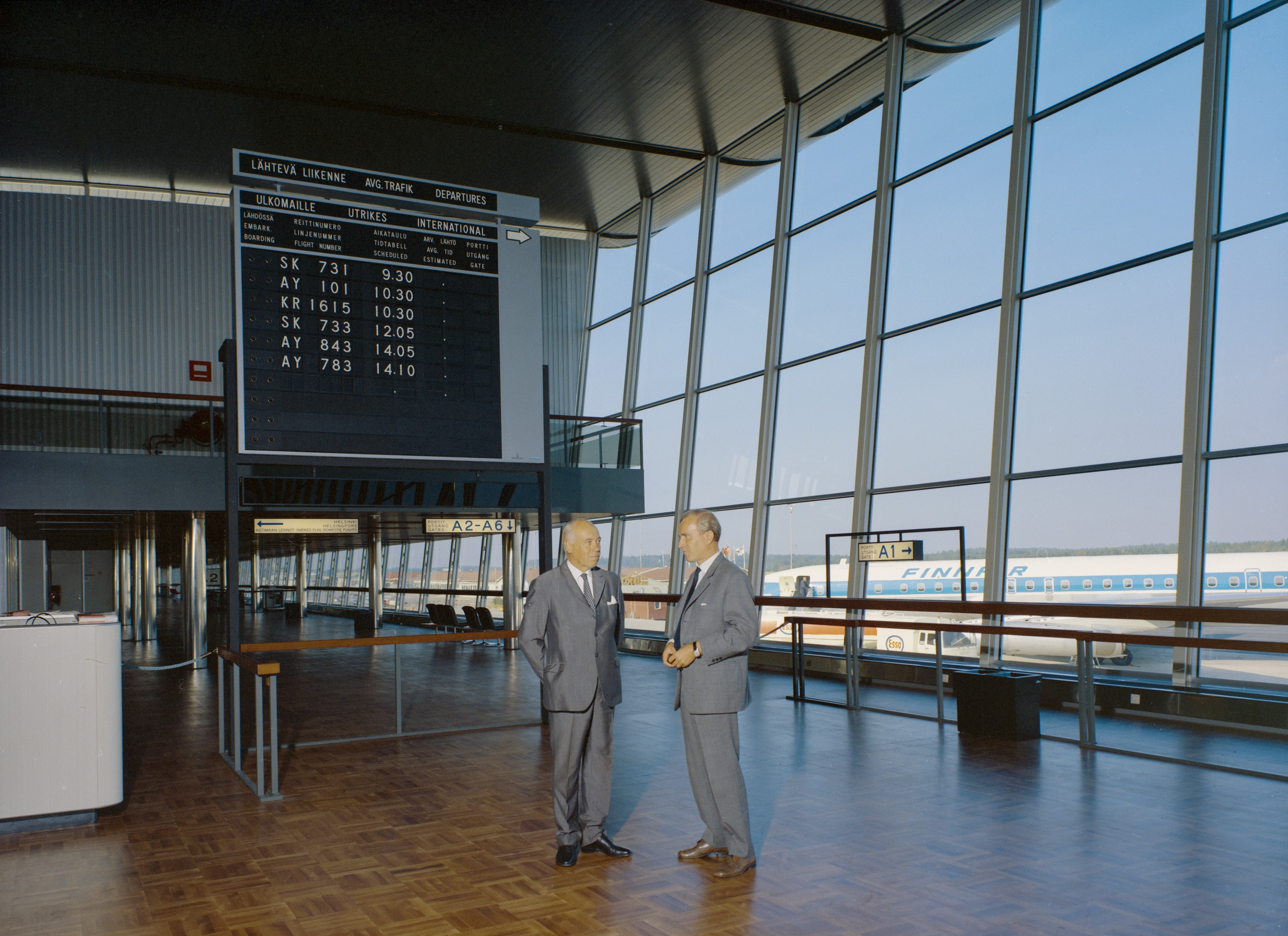
An interior view of the terminal (later known as terminal 2) at the Helsinki Airport circa 1969. In the foreground are Finnair's chief of aviation Olavi Siirilä (left) and CEO Gunnar Korhonen (right).

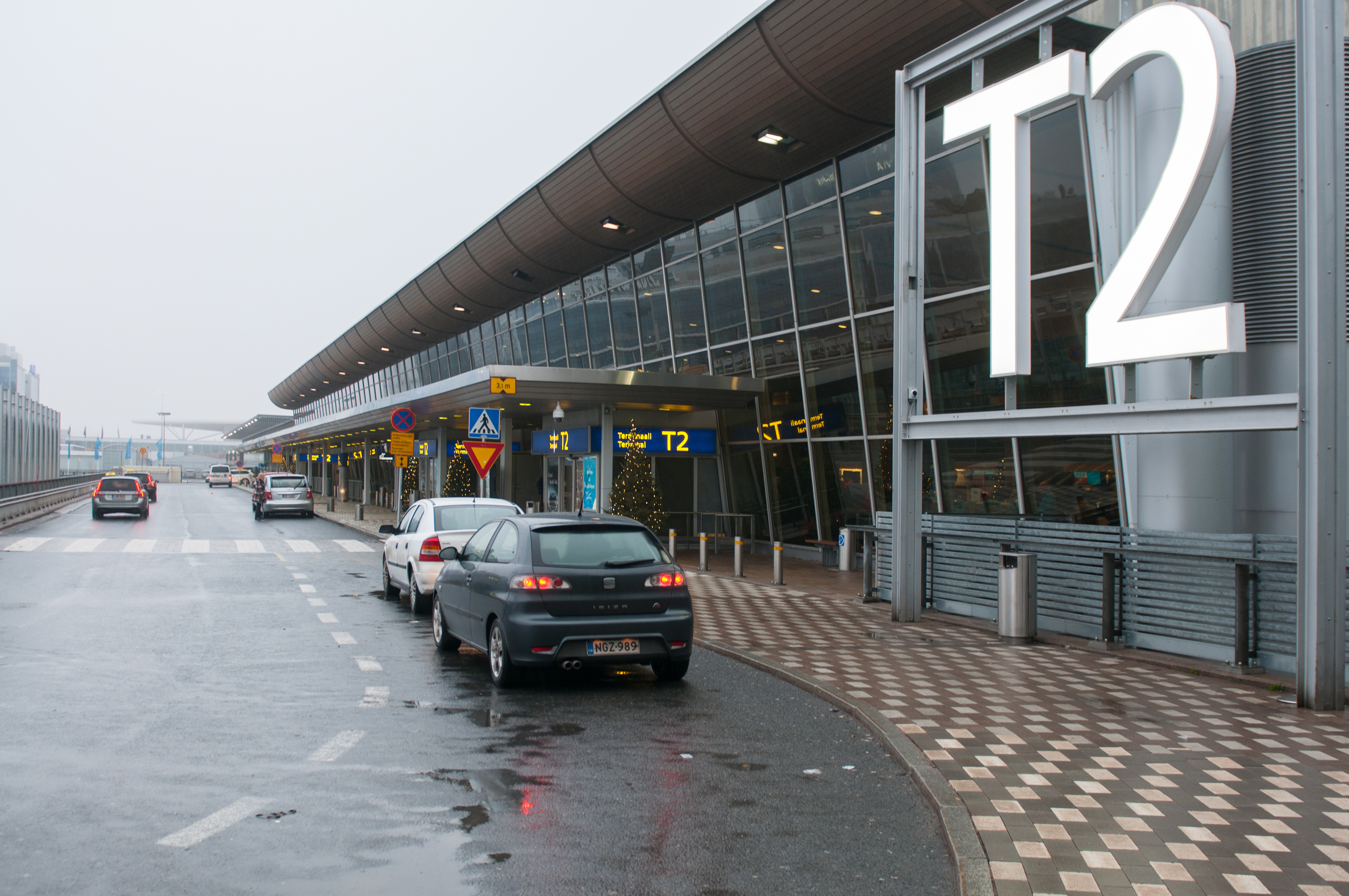
The old entrance to terminal 2

=== Opening and the first intercontinental service (1952–1960s) ===
The planning of a new airport for Helsinki began in the 1940s, when it became obvious that the Helsinki-Malmi Airport could not handle the increasing number of passengers or the new, heavier aircraft. A new site was found some 20 km (12 mi) from Helsinki city centre, in an area that today belongs to the city of Vantaa (until 1971 Vantaa was called Helsingin maalaiskunta). Some of the construction work was done by prison laborers. The airport opened temporarily in July 1952 for that year's Summer Olympics, held in Helsinki.

The first two Aero Oy DC-3 aircraft, OH-LCC Tiira with its captain Olli Puhakka and first officer Pertti Uuksulainen, and OH-LCD Lokki, landed in Vantaa on 26 June 1952, and the first scheduled international airplane to land on the airport was the DC-6 B Torgil Viking of Scandinavian Airlines on 26 October 1952. While Aero (now Finnair) used Helsinki-Malmi Airport, charter flights were directed to the new airport on 26 October 1952. The airport originally had a single runway, the second runway being built four years later in 1956, and the first airplane hangar was also built in the same year. The airport also received its first radar in the same year. Regular jet flight operations began in 1959.

A new passenger terminal opened in 1969, while the first transatlantic service to New York was inaugurated on 15 May 1969. A contiguous fence around the entire airport area was built in the spring of 1973.

During this time period, the airport was also called Seutula Airport after the nearby village Seutula.

=== New terminal and first Asian flights (1970s–1990s) ===
The year 1973 saw the first security checks being carried out for international flights. The name Helsinki-Vantaa Airport was used from 1977, with the airport being known as the Helsinki Airport before this. The postal code of the airport was 01530 Helsinki-Lento until 1974, 01530 Helsinki-Vantaa-Lento from 1974 to 1983 and 01530 Vantaa from 1983 onwards.

The Finnish Defence Forces surrounded the airport in late autumn 1977, in order to protect the airport from a possible terrorist strike by the Red Army Faction.

In 1991, Delta Air Lines began its operations at the airport. A new terminal was constructed for domestic flights in 1993. In 1996, the international terminal was expanded and merged with the domestic terminal. At the same time, the new control tower was completed. In 1997, a new VIP President terminal was opened for official international state visits. In November 1999, the international terminal was further expanded and the lobby for arriving and departing passengers was built.

=== New millennium and expansion of non-Schengen area (2000–2009) ===
A historical event in 2000 was that the annual number of visitors to the Helsinki-Vantaa Airport surpassed 10 million. Approach traffic control moved from the so-called "cave" into its new overground premises.

New border controls of the Schengen Agreement were taken into use in 2001. The third runway was inaugurated on 28 November 2002 and the first user was Finnair's McDonnell Douglas MD-11 en route to New York. In 2004, the international terminal was again expanded and a new shopping area was opened for long-haul passengers. A new air cargo service was opened for passengers with overweight luggage. 24 new automatic check-in terminals were taken into use in 2006.

On 13 August 2007 a new Hilton hotel, Hilton Helsinki-Vantaa Airport was opened near the airport, with 330 rooms. Independent use of parallel runways started in November 2007.

A free-of-charge WLAN network was opened at the airport on 25 November 2008.

In the autumn of 2009, the airport saw a great deal of industrial action, as Finavia outsourced check-in security controls. The security controls were moved over to the cleaning and building service concern SOL. The labour agreements also changed. SOL started co-operation negotiations for 80 employees in January 2010. Outsourcing the security services had a positive impact on Finavia's economy, as this allowed the company to reach significant cost savings during the first half of 2010 compared to the second half of the previous year. This was largely because of the outsourcing of the security services at the Helsinki Airport. In late 2012, the Labour Court of Finland gave a statement that the security services at the airport were under the labour agreement of the security guard industry. After this, SOL terminated its contract, to end at the end of 2014 in the middle of its contract period.

Finnair outsourced its baggage handling services from its daughter company Northport to Barona Handling in November to December 2009, after which the baggage handling employees went on an illegal strike for four days. During New Year from 2009 to 2010, thousands of bags lay untouched at the airport, inaccessible to their owners. According to the employees, there were one tenth less people handling the loading of the baggage than before. The Aviation Union accused Barona of neglecting safety regulations when unloading the accumulated pile of baggage during the industrial action. In January 2010, the Finnish News Agency wrote that some of the employees had sent baggage to the wrong destination on purpose. In 2009, the airport dropped out of the list of the Airport Service Quality research.

In 2009, an expansion of Terminal 2 was completed. The total floor area was 43,908 square metres (472,620 sq ft). The same year witnessed the opening of a new shopping area and spa for passengers on long-haul flights, the removal of a terminal-specific division between domestic and international flights in favour a division by airline, and the renovation of Terminal 1 for international flights. In the same year, TAP Air Portugal commenced service between Helsinki and Lisbon.

Five new passenger bridges for wide-body aircraft were opened in 2009. The spa was closed down in 2012 because of lack of use. In 2011, the annual number of passengers at the airport grew by 15.5% to 14.9 million passengers. About 25% of passengers were transferring to a connecting flight at the airport. 12.2 million passengers were on international flights and 2.7 million on domestic flights. A total of 1.63 million passengers were on flights to Asia.

=== Significant growth and expansion (2010–2019) ===
During the 2010s, Helsinki Airport experienced large increases in the number of annual passengers. In 2010, the airport handled 12,883,399 passengers, an increase of 2.2 percent compared to 2009. Air freight increased by 29.4 percent.

In April 2010, Norwegian Air Shuttle opened its first routes to Oslo and Stockholm using Boeing 737 jets. Now the airline is one of the largest operators at the airport with almost 40 destinations in Europe, Asia, and Africa. In 2011, Helsinki Airport saw its biggest growth in a single year in the number of passengers. The number of annual passengers was increased by 2 million passengers and the airport reached the milestone of 14 million passengers. However, easyJet canceled three routes, from Helsinki to Manchester, London–Gatwick, and Paris–Charles de Gaulle, citing weak demand at Helsinki.

In the 2010s, the airport saw a huge growth of long-haul flights in terms of weekly flights (see Long-haul traffic below).

In the beginning of 2015, the renovation and construction work related to the development of Helsinki Airport started. For example, the Baggage Claim Hall 2B and Arrival Hall 2A were renovated and in July 2015, train operation on the Ring Rail Line and connection to Helsinki Central Railway Station were opened. In March 2015, Swiss International Air Lines started operations to Helsinki but canceled it a year later. In late 2015, Blue1 ceased all operations from Helsinki which was the airline's only base. The airline flew to 28 destinations in Europe. Scandinavian Airlines sold Blue1 to CityJet, which continues to operate the company on behalf of SAS as part of a larger relationship.

As of 2013, Finavia was expanding the airport (see Future expansion below).

Life in HEL (#lifeinhel) was a Finavia marketing campaign which took place from 10 October to 9 November 2017 at Helsinki Airport. The campaign mixed TV, game shows, and social media. Ryan Zhu, a Chinese actor and TV personality, lived in a little cabin inside Helsinki Airport for 30 days. Helsinki Airport was awarded the title of best airport in the world by Travellink; by the campaign, Finavia wanted to prove this claim.

=== COVID-19 pandemic and Russian airspace closure (2020–present) ===
In early 2020, Helsinki Airport was hit by the COVID-19 pandemic. By April 2020, almost all traffic was suspended and the airport handled only about 3.9 million passengers during January–April, down sharply from the previous year. Overall for the full year 2020, Helsinki Airport saw passenger numbers collapse to roughly 5 million, a dramatic reduction from pre-pandemic levels as international travel fell to historic lows.

Only after 2022 did passenger volumes start to increase, with recovery continuing through 2023–2025 as travel restrictions eased and airlines resumed more services.

A new terminal expansion was opened in December 2021. The terminals 1 and 2 were combined on 21 June 2022 so that all flights are now operated from a single terminal.

Following the pandemic, Russian airspace was closed in February 2022 as part of Russian reciprocal sanctions, forcing airlines to detour, causing notable increases in flight lengths. This closure has significantly affected Helsinki’s role as a Europe-Asia hub, because many pre-pandemic routings relied on shorter northern routes over Russia. Since the closure, the number of long-haul routes to Asia has remained lower compared to 2019; for example, Finnair’s only current mainland Chinese nonstop service from Helsinki is to Shanghai, whereas pre-pandemic the airline offered dozens of weekly flights to Chinese destinations in 2019.

In 2024, Helsinki Airport was named the best airport in Northern Europe for the seventh time, based on Skytrax’s global survey covering feedback from over 550 airports.

== Construction projects ==
Runway 3 (22R/04L) was repaired from April to June 2012, during which time the runway was out of use. After this the taxiway next to runway 2 (15/33) was repaired, during which time runway 2 served as a temporary taxiway. The repairs were completed in September 2012.

The main runway 04R/22L was repaired in the summer of 2015, and was reopened in early August.

The Helsinki Airport station was opened on 10 July 2015. The Ring Rail Line connects the Helsinki–Riihimäki railway in the north with the Vantaankoski railway in the west. The trip from the airport to the Helsinki Central station takes about half an hour, and the trip to Tikkurila railway station takes about ten minutes. The Helsinki Airport station was built underground between the parking garages P3A and P1/P2. The station has a walking connection to the connecting corridor between terminals 1 and 2.

Expansion of the terminals started in early 2016 from the southern wing of the long-distance flight area, which was completed in the summer of 2017. After this, construction of the western wing was started, which was completed in the autumn of 2019. Expansion of terminal 1 was also started in 2017, giving the terminal an additional 3,500 square metres of floor area. Terminal 1 was lengthened by 230 metres and gained seven new departure gates.

As part of the development program, a new parking garage was also opened, with a connection to the terminal. The new parking garage is equipped with solar panels, and it has an area for recharging 200 electric cars. The development program also included about 2000 new parking places.

Expansion of the terminal is undergoing to the north of the terminal building, including expansion of the number of commercial services, gates and docks for airplanes. The expansion also includes improvement of passenger connections to the terminal. The expansion was taken into use in late 2021.

The development program was completed in September 2023. Before this, new lobbies for departing and arriving passengers and a connecting travel centre were taken into use. Also the old departure lobby of Terminal 2 will be changed into part of the Schengen gate area, expanding the size of the area considerably.

A two-part Avia Pilot building with 13 floors was built within walking distance of the terminal, with Finavia as its main tenant. In early 2018, a new Scandic Hotels hotel with 148 rooms was opened in the building. This is the third hotel in the immediate vicinity of the airport.

== Composition ==
Map of Helsinki Airport

Since 21 June 2021, the airport has operated from a single terminal divided into Schengen & Non-Schengen sections. The terminal capacity of the airport is approximately 30 million passengers per year.

Domestic flights and flights to European Schengen countries are operated from gates 5–36. Long-haul and European non-Schengen flights are operated from gates 37–55.

In 2014, Helsinki Airport introduced the world's first passenger tracking system, which automatically monitors crowd congestion and prevents bottlenecks at the airport.

The airport's signage is in English, Finnish, Swedish, Korean, Chinese, Japanese, and Russian.

Current terminal (former Terminal 2) opened in 1969 for international operations and, at present, also serves domestic flights. The non-Schengen area of the terminal was enlarged in 2009 enabling the airport to accommodate eight wide-body aircraft at gates simultaneously while a new shopping area and a spa were opened for passengers on long-distance flights, and the division between domestic and international flights was removed. Terminal 2 has many restaurants, bars and shopping areas. The terminal is equipped with 36 aircraft parking stands with passenger bridges. The terminal has a train connection to Helsinki Central railway station.

Passenger facilities include numerous tax-free shops, Avis, Europcar and Hertz-car rentals, free wireless Internet access, power sockets, lockers, sleeping pods and transfer service desks. Currency exchange, cash machines (ATM), tourist information and an Alepa grocery store and pharmacy are also available. For children, there are also several playrooms. Dining facilities include Burger King and O'Learys Sports Bar as well as numerous other restaurants and cafés. Terminal also includes two Finnair lounges: Finnair Lounge in the Schengen-area and Finnair Premium Lounge in the non-Schengen area. A few more lounges, including Plaza Premium Lounge are also located at the airport.

As a part of Helsinki Airport's expansion plan, the new South Pier was inaugurated in June 2017 and Aukio in February 2019. The new pier features moving walkways and dual boarding jet bridges to enable handling larger aircraft more efficiently. In November 2019, the West Pier opened and it is able to accommodate the Airbus A380 superjumbo. Five of the gates can accommodate two regional jets, such as Boeing 737s or Airbus A320s, simultaneously. Passengers arriving and departing are divided into two floors: one for arriving passengers, the other for departures. In June 2016, the new bus terminal for remote aircraft stand operations was opened to increase the airport's capacity with gates 50A-M.

=== Other buildings ===
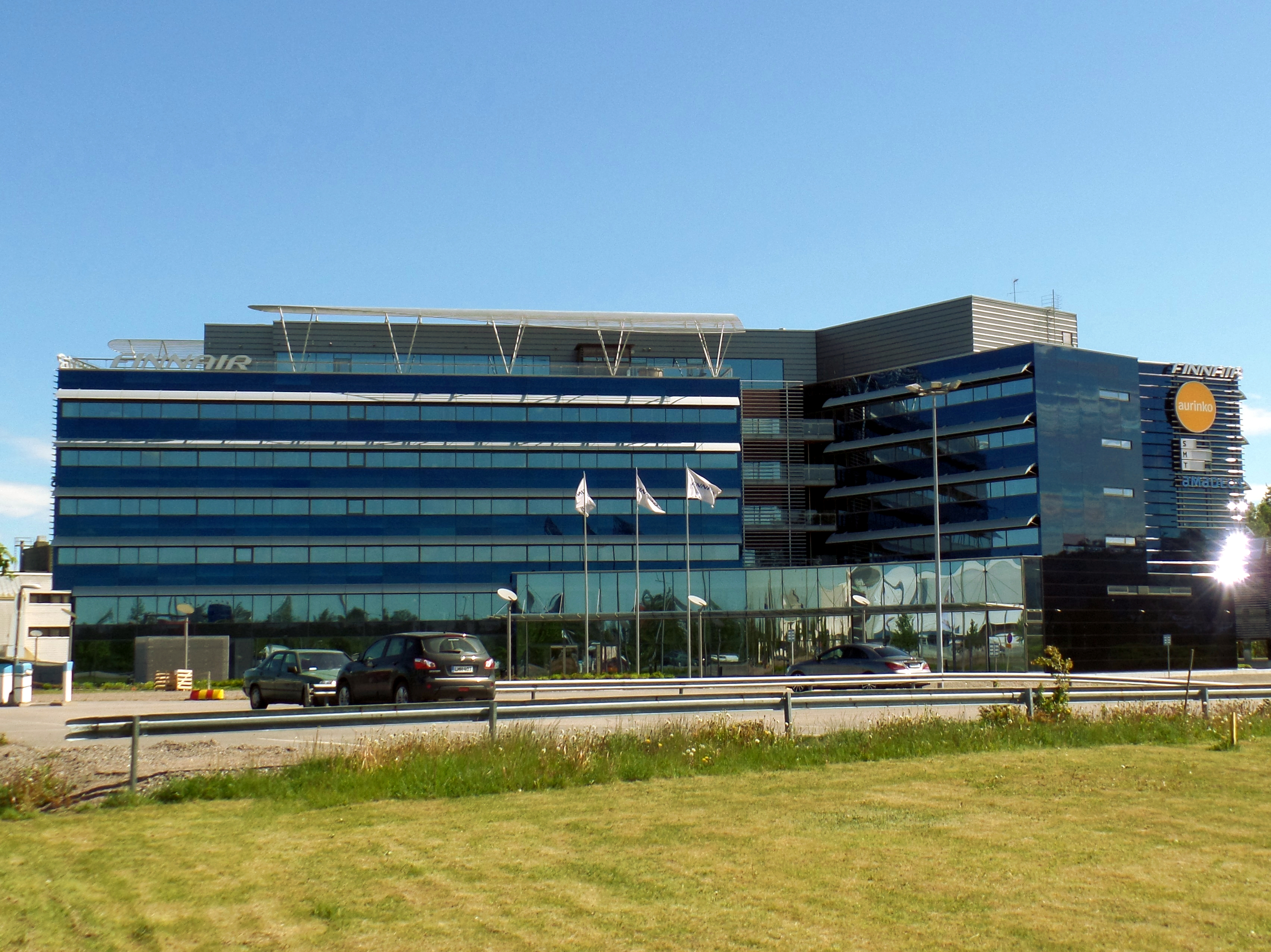
Finnair head office, House of Travel and Transportation

There are several airport hotels and office buildings on the grounds of the airport. The Aviapolis is a new international business park adjacent to the Helsinki airport area, already hosting the operations of numerous companies around the airport. In 2013, Finnair opened its new head office, known as House of Travel and Transportation, or "HOTT". The construction of HOTT began in July 2011 and finished on time in June 2013.

=== Ground handling ===
Airpro, Aviator, and Swissport provide ground handling services for airlines.

== Runways ==
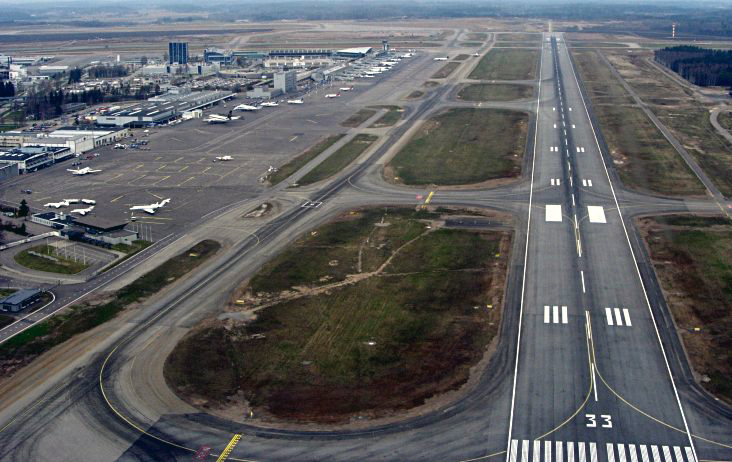
Runway 33 at Helsinki Airport

Helsinki Airport has three runways. The runways can handle take-offs and landings of the heaviest aircraft in use today such as the Airbus A380. The use of three runways allows two runways to be kept in operation when clearing of snow and ice is needed (if one runway is being cleared at a time).

Number	Runway direction/code	Length (in metres and feet)	ILS	Surface	Notes
1	04R/22L	3,500 m 11,483 ft	Cat. II (both directions)	Asphalt	The first runway at the airport
2	15/33	2,901 m 9,518 ft	Cat. I (15)	Asphalt	15 used for propeller and low visibility departures. 33 only used during strong winds from NW.
3	04L/22R	3,060 m 10,039 ft	Cat. III (04L)	Asphalt	Inaugurated on 28 November 2002

=== Runway usage principles ===
There are about twenty different runway combinations in use. The primary runway for landings is Runway 2 (15) from the northwest, i.e. from the direction of Nurmijärvi, or Runway 1 (22L) from the northeast, i.e., from the direction of Kerava, while the primary runway for take-offs is Runway 3 (22R) towards the southwest, in the direction of Western Vantaa and Espoo. Aircraft with low noise can take off from Runway 1 (22L) towards the south at the same time. When the wind is from the north or east, Runway 3 (04L) or Runway 1 (04R) are usually used for landings, i.e., for approaches from the southwest, the direction of Western Vantaa and Espoo, while take-offs are made from Runway 1 (04R) towards the northeast in the direction of Kerava.

During the night time, landings are primarily made using Runway 2 (15) from the northwest, i.e., from the direction of Nurmijärvi, and take-offs using Runway 3 (22R) towards the southwest, in the direction of Espoo. Jet plane landings to Runway 2 (33) from the southeast and take-offs from Runway 2 (15) towards the southeast are avoided due to dense population in the affected areas. During night time, propeller plane operations towards the southeast are also prohibited unless otherwise dictated by air traffic safety. Air traffic safety is the main reason for not always being able to choose the optimal runway for noise control.

== Technology ==
=== Airport-CDM ===
In October 2012, Finavia implemented Airport CDM (Collaborative Decision Making) at Helsinki Airport. It is a procedure by Eurocontrol, the European Organization for Safety of Air Navigation, that develops airport operation by increasing co-operation between partners at the airport. Airport CDM aims to reduce costs, achieve lower emissions, improve punctuality of operations and increase customer satisfaction at the airport. Helsinki Airport was the seventh European and first Northern European airport to adopt the program.

== Operations ==
=== Passenger operations ===
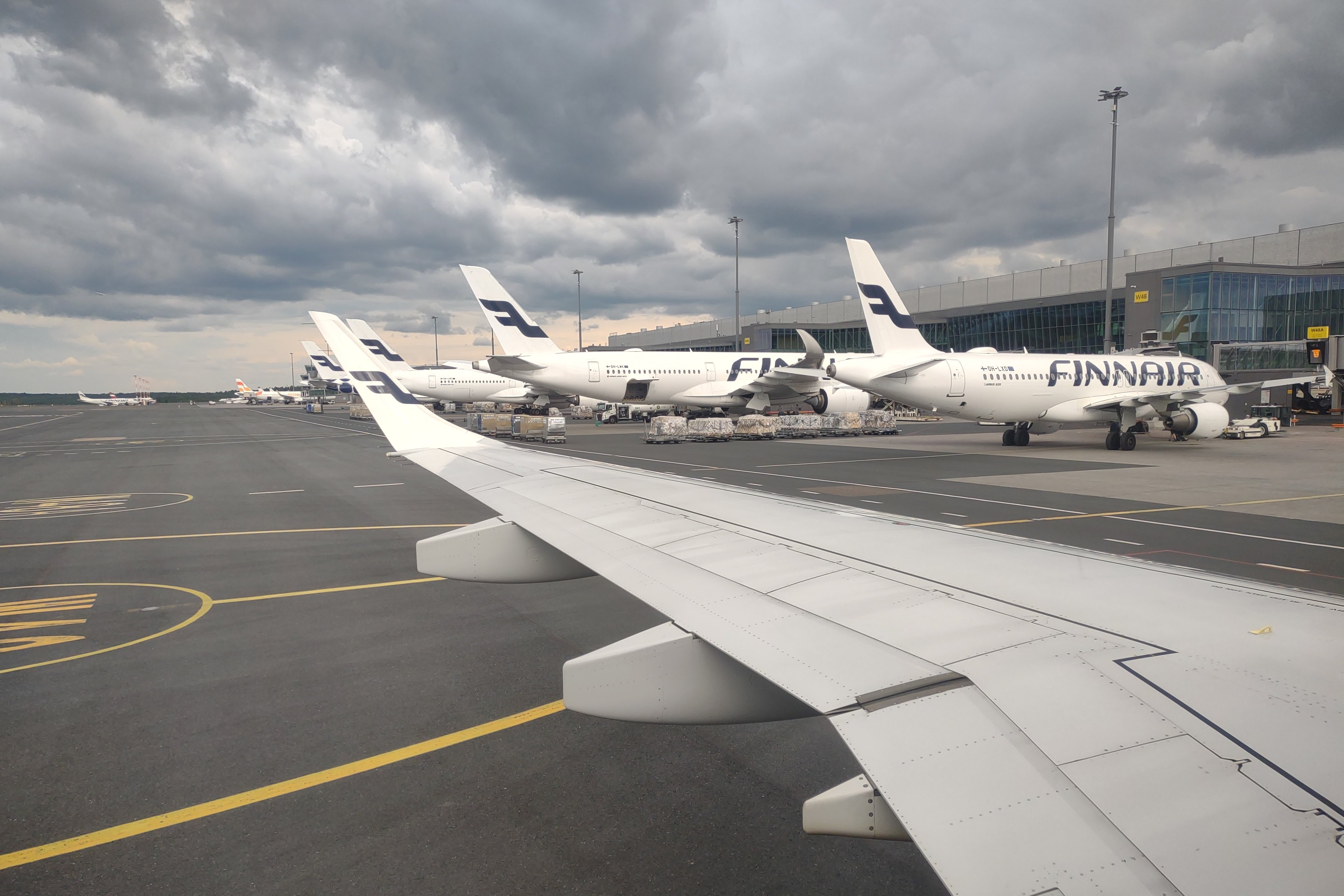
Finnair is the largest airline operating at the airport.

As of 2026, Helsinki Airport is connected to around 140 destinations worldwide. The airport is the main hub for Finnair, that operates flights to Europe, Asia, and North America. The airport is also used as an operating base for Norwegian Air Shuttle.

Passenger numbers increased rapidly in the late 2010s, and in 2018 the airport handled over 20 million passengers for the first time. In 2025, the airport served around 17 million passengers.

==== Main airlines ====
The following airlines maintain hub or base operations at Helsinki Airport:

- Finnair, the airport's main airline, operates flights with an all-Airbus mainline fleet of 53 aircraft to over 100 destinations in Europe, Asia, North America, the Middle East, and, from October 2026 onwards, Australia.
- Nordic Regional Airlines (abbreviated as Norra) operates 24 aircraft (12x ATR 72 and 12x Embraer ERJ-190) out of Helsinki Airport for Finnair on domestic and European routes. In March 2026, Finnair announced a firm order of 18 Embraer E195-E2 aircraft, with an additional 16 options and 12 purchase rights, that will be operated by Norra.
- Norwegian Air Shuttle is a low-cost airline that operates to nearly 30 destinations from Helsinki to Europe and Northern Africa. The airline is the biggest operator at the airport after Finnair (including Norra) and has served over 10 million passengers since 2010.
- SunClass Airlines uses Helsinki Airport as a focus city with many charter flights to Southeast Asia and Europe.

=== Cargo operations ===
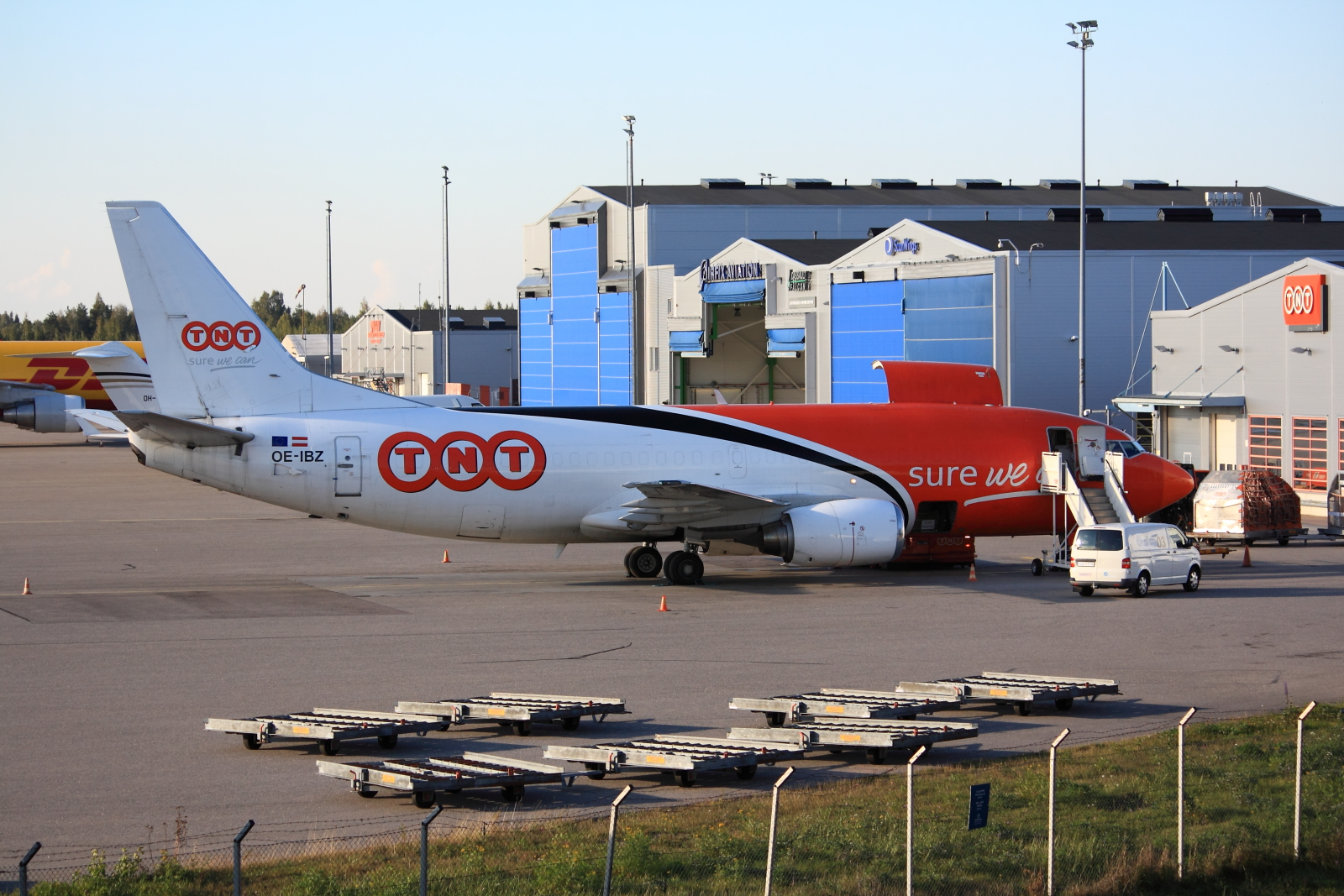
TNT Airways Boeing 737-300F aircraft at its cargo terminal and DHL Aviation A300-600F in the background

In 2025, Helsinki Airport handled 184,004 tonnes of freight. This made it the third busiest Nordic airport by freight handled, only surpassed by Copenhagen Airport and Oslo Airport.

Helsinki Airport has extensive cargo flight activity. There is a cargo area with cargo terminals and cargo transit facilities in the southeastern part of the airport area. DHL has a cargo terminal at the airport. In addition to scheduled cargo operations, many other cargo airlines operate on an ad hoc basis at Helsinki Airport. Cargo at the airport is not limited to dedicated freighter aircraft. A significant amount is transported as belly cargo on passenger services, alongside scheduled freighter operations and occasional/ad-hoc cargo flights.

The construction of a new freight terminal (35,000 m^{2} or 380,000 sq ft) began in March 2015 and was inaugurated on 8 January 2018. The capacity of the terminal is 350,000 tonnes but the theoretical capacity is up to 450,000 tonnes. The freight capacity of the airport is being expanded to accommodate the growing freight capacity that will be provided by Finnair's Airbus A350 XWB fleet. Finnair's freight operations continued in the previous location until relocation to the new freight terminal in December 2017. The name of the new terminal is Cool Nordic Cargo Hub, but is branded COOL for its modern technology and capacity to handle high volumes of temperature-controlled cargo. A new operations monitoring and tracking platform, "Cargo Eye", is used in the new freight terminal. That gives the new Cargo Control Center a live view of what is happening across the cargo network and where everything is located. The terminal has 29 stands for truck transports.

== Long-haul traffic ==
The airport’s first long-haul route began on 15 May 1969 when Finnair commenced flights to New York City via Copenhagen and Amsterdam. The first non-stop route to East Asia started in 1983 with Finnair’s flight to Tokyo, and service to Beijing began in 1988.

Long-haul traffic has been a major part of the airport’s operations, in large part thanks to Finnair, the largest carrier at the airport. Before the COVID-19 pandemic, the airport was an important transfer airport between Europe and Asia. In 2019, Helsinki Airport handled approximately 3.6 million transfer passengers, which was significantly higher than in previous years. At the beginning of 2018, over 140 weekly flights were flown directly from Helsinki to Asia. In 2019, the airport was connected to six airports in Japan and nine airports in China through various carriers including Finnair. Finnair and Japan Airlines had long been the only carriers flying to Asia from Helsinki, but in 2019 Tibet Airlines, Juneyao Air and Sichuan Airlines launched non-stop flights from Jinan, Shanghai and Chengdu, respectively. In 2020, Juneyao Air also planned to add tag flights from Helsinki to Dublin, Manchester and Reykjavík, but those plans were later abandoned after the onset of the pandemic.

The closure of Russian airspace in early 2022 prohibits most EU airlines from overflying Russia, removing the “short northern route” that had been a key element in Finnair’s Europe-Asia strategy and forcing flights to detour via longer southern routes. This has led to longer flight durations and increased operational costs, and has forced Finnair to terminate or reduce many of its previous routes to Asia; as a result, Helsinki Airport’s total passenger numbers in 2024 were still about 25 % below the 2019 level. Finnair has since adapted its network strategy, strengthening service to North America and other markets as part of a more balanced long-haul network.

In 2026, Helsinki Airport will be connected to five different continents: Europe, Asia, Africa, North America and Australia. This comes as Finnair announced direct flights to Melbourne, Australia. In January 2026, China Southern Airlines announced a direct route from Beijing Daxing to Helsinki starting in March 2026, reconnecting Helsinki with Beijing after a multi-year hiatus. Also in January, Emirates announced it would start direct flights from Dubai to Helsinki.

== Airlines and destinations ==
=== Passenger ===
Helsinki Airport offers non-stop flights to around 140 destinations around the world, operated by over 20 airlines. The following airlines offer flights at Helsinki Airport:

Airlines	Destinations
Aegean Airlines	Athens
Air France	Paris–Charles de Gaulle
Air Serbia	Belgrade (resumes 1 April 2027)
airBaltic	Riga
BASe Airlines	Pori, Savonlinna
China Southern Airlines	Beijing–Daxing
Emirates	Dubai–International
Eurowings	Berlin
Finnair	Alta, Amsterdam, Bangkok–Suvarnabhumi, Barcelona, Bergen, Berlin, Brussels, Budapest, Copenhagen, Dallas/Fort Worth, Delhi–Indira Gandhi, Dublin, Düsseldorf, Edinburgh, Faro, Frankfurt, Funchal, Gazipaşa, Gdańsk, Geneva, Gothenburg, Hamburg, Hong Kong, Ivalo, Joensuu, Jyväskylä, Kajaani, Kemi, Kirkenes, Kittilä, Kokkola, Kraków, Kuopio, Kuusamo, Lisbon, London–Heathrow, Los Angeles, Luxembourg, Madrid, Málaga, Manchester, Mariehamn, Melbourne, Milan–Malpensa, Munich, New York–JFK, Nice, Osaka–Kansai, Oslo, Oulu, Paris–Charles de Gaulle, Prague, Reykjavík–Keflavík, Riga, Rome–Fiumicino, Rovaniemi, Seoul–Incheon, Shanghai–Pudong, Singapore, Stavanger, Stockholm–Arlanda, Tallinn, Tampere, Tartu, Tokyo–Haneda, Tokyo–Narita, Tromsø, Turin, Turku, Umeå, Vaasa, Valencia, Vienna, Vilnius, Warsaw–Chopin, Zurich; Seasonal: Agadir, Alicante, Antalya, Billund, Bodø, Bologna, Catania, Chania, Chicago–O'Hare, Dubrovnik, Florence, Fuerteventura, Gran Canaria, Innsbruck, Krabi (resumes 26 November 2026), Kos, Kuressaare, Lanzarote, Lemnos, Ljubljana, Miami, Milan–Linate, Nagoya–Centrair, Naples, Palma de Mallorca, Phuket, Rhodes, Salzburg, Seattle/Tacoma, Split, Tenerife–South, Thessaloniki, Tirana, Toronto–Pearson, Trondheim, Venice, Visby; Seasonal charter: Burgas, Karpathos
Icelandair	Reykjavík–Keflavík
Japan Airlines	Tokyo–Haneda
Juneyao Air	Shanghai–Pudong
KLM	Amsterdam
Lufthansa	Frankfurt, Munich
Luxair	Luxembourg
Lygg	Linköping, Örebro
Norwegian Air Shuttle	Alicante, Bergamo, London–Gatwick, Málaga, Oslo, Pristina, Rovaniemi, Stockholm–Arlanda; Seasonal: Agadir, Athens, Barcelona, Bucharest–Otopeni, Burgas, Chania, Copenhagen, Gran Canaria, Hurghada, Larnaca, Malta, Marrakesh, Nice, Palma de Mallorca, Pisa, Split, Tenerife–South, Tirana, Tivat, Tromsø (begins 18 November 2026)
Pegasus Airlines	Istanbul–Sabiha Gökçen; Seasonal: Antalya
Qatar Airways	Doha
Ryanair	Alicante, Bergamo, Charleroi, London–Stansted, Thessaloniki, Vienna; Seasonal: Dubrovnik, Venice, Warsaw–Modlin, Zadar
Scandinavian Airlines	Copenhagen, Stockholm–Arlanda
Sunclass Airlines	Seasonal charter: Gazipaşa, Hurghada, Kos, Varna
SunExpress	Seasonal: Antalya
Turkish Airlines	Istanbul

=== Cargo ===
Airlines	Destinations
FedEx Express	Paris–Charles de Gaulle
Qatar Airways Cargo	Budapest, Doha
Sichuan Airlines Cargo	Chengdu–Tianfu
Turkish Cargo	Istanbul
UPS Airlines	Cologne/Bonn

== Statistics ==
Russia Ukraine Countries that have banned Russian aircraft from their airspace

Helsinki Airport served 16,980,287 passengers in 2025 making it the fourth-busiest Nordic airport behind Copenhagen (32,432,770), Oslo Gardermoen (27,072,860) and Stockholm Arlanda (24,318,991), but ahead of Reykjavík-Keflavík (8,159,461).

Before the COVID-19 pandemic, Helsinki Airport was the busiest Nordic airport in terms of Asian passengers and in 2015, the airport was the fifth busiest airport in Europe in terms of flights to Asia. In 2018, Helsinki Airport was connected to Asia with over 140 weekly flights. When ranked by connectivity, the airport was the best-connected airport in Northern Europe with around 10,000 connections worldwide, 85% more than in Copenhagen which was the 2nd best-connected airport in the Nordics. The number of connections from Helsinki Airport had grown by 96% during the 2010s. In Europe, the airport was the 12th best-connected airport. According to Airports Council International (ACI), Helsinki Airport was one of the fastest-growing airports in Europe in 2017.

In 2016, passengers from Japan, China, South Korea and United States made up the four largest groups of non-European travelers at Helsinki Airport. The airport handled around 386,000 Japanese passengers, 321,000 Chinese passengers, 136,000 Korean passengers and 98,000 US citizens. Other major nationalities were Singapore, Thailand, Turkey, Malaysia, Ukraine, Vietnam, Taiwan, Israel and Indonesia.

In the 2010s, Helsinki Airport's passenger volumes grew significantly. In 2010, the airport handled 12.9 million passengers while by 2019, the number of annual passengers had nearly doubled to over 21.8 million passengers.

In 2024, Finavia stated that "transfer travel from Asia to Europe via Helsinki Airport is... approximately 30% lower than in 2019" due to Russian reciprocal sanctions prohibiting Finnair among others, to use Russian airspace, making the flight time on some routes several hours longer, more fuel consuming and previous flight connections impossible.

Busiest European routes to/from Helsinki Airport (2024)
Rank	Airport	All passengers	Annual change	Operating airlines
1	Stockholm–Arlanda	1,074,728	▲5.1%	Finnair, Norwegian, Scandinavian
2	London–Heathrow, London–Stansted	668,211	▲2.0%	Finnair, Ryanair
3	Copenhagen	607,369	▲0.9%	Finnair, Norwegian, Scandinavian
4	Amsterdam	606,499	▲1.7%	Finnair, KLM, Norwegian
5	Munich	495,994	▲4.2%	Finnair, Lufthansa
6	Frankfurt	474,248	▲5.0%	Finnair, Lufthansa
7	Paris–Charles de Gaulle	464,956	▼2.7%	Air France, Finnair
8	Riga	395,622	▲12.3%	Air Baltic, Finnair
9	Málaga	356,671	▲1.7%	Finnair, Norwegian
10	Berlin	349,394	▲1.4%	Eurowings, Finnair

Busiest intercontinental routes to/from Helsinki Airport (2024)
Rank	Airport	All passengers	Annual change	Operating airlines
1	Tokyo–Haneda, Tokyo–Narita	354,307	▲7.8%	Finnair, Japan Airlines
2	Bangkok–Suvarnabhumi	253,703	▲12.2%	Finnair
3	Seoul–Incheon	183,470	▼4.8%	Finnair
4	Singapore	166,399	▼0.9%	Finnair
5	Doha	165,896	▲4.6%	Finnair
6	Hong Kong	160,772	▼0.1%	Finnair
7	New York–JFK	153,980	▼4.0%	Finnair
8	Delhi	149,790	▼2.4%	Finnair
9	Shanghai–Pudong	124,372	▲26.0%	Finnair, Juneyao Airlines
10	Dallas/Fort Worth	114,659	▲37.1%	Finnair

Busiest domestic routes to/from Helsinki Airport (2024)
Rank	Airport	All passengers	Annual change	Operating airlines
1	Rovaniemi	531,960	▲16.3%	Finnair, Norwegian
2	Oulu	504,558	▼1.9%	Finnair
3	Kittilä	195,149	▲5.5%	Finnair
4	Ivalo	178,812	▲14.9%	Finnair
5	Kuopio	109,978	▼12.7%	Finnair

Main cargo routes to/from Helsinki Airport (2024)
Rank	Airport	Tonnes	Annual change
1	Tokyo–Haneda, Tokyo–Narita	22,120	▼5.2%
2	Bangkok–Suvarnabhumi	15,092	▲8.0%
3	Leipzig	14,305	▼12.9%
4	Seoul–Incheon	12,049	▲3.0%
5	Shanghai–Pudong	10,666	▲21.1%

Top European countries by total passenger movements (2024)
Rank	Country	All passengers	Annual change
1	Germany	1,591,188	▲5.6%
2	Spain	1,306,192	▲3.7%
3	Sweden	1,250,248	▲4.8%
4	United Kingdom	908,403	▲6.5%
5	Italy	701,318	▲7.2%
6	Denmark	628,179	▲2.4%
7	Netherlands	607,389	▲1.9%
8	Greece	596,073	▲8.2%
9	France	596,054	▼0.8%
10	Norway	494,381	▲14.7%

Top non-European countries by total passenger movements (2024)
Rank	Country	All passengers	Annual change
1	Japan	470,644	▲21.0%
2	Turkey	468,362	▲11.6%
3	United States	417,441	▲1.8%
4	Thailand	308,820	▲12.0%
5	China	304,079	▲10.0%
6	South Korea	185,707	▼3.6%
7	Singapore	166,399	▼0.9%
8	Qatar	165,896	▲4.5%
9	India	149,551	▼20.4%
10	United Arab Emirates	40,277	▲28.2%

=== Passengers ===
Annual passenger statistics for Helsinki Airport
Year	Domestic passengers	International passengers	Total passengers	Change
1998	2,900,145	6,455,035	9,355,180	
1999	2,803,127	6,763,561	9,566,688	+2.3% ▲
2000	3,042,931	6,967,023	10,009,954	+4.6% ▲
2001	2,999,672	7,031,246	10,030,918	+0.2% ▲
2002	2,747,862	6,862,025	9,609,887	−4.2% ▼
2003	2,684,618	7,026,302	9,710,920	+1.1% ▲
2004	2,836,852	7,893,094	10,729,946	+10.5% ▲
2005	2,804,304	8,328,891	11,133,195	+3.8% ▲
2006	2,927,627	9,220,154	12,147,781	+9.1% ▲
2007	2,875,296	10,266,326	13,141,622	+8.2%▲
2008	2,700,369	10,744,071	13,444,440	+2.3% ▲
2009	2,372,885	10,238,302	12,611,187	−6.2% ▼
2010	2,207,638	10,664,984	12,872,622	+2.1% ▲
2011	2,707,044	12,159,027	14,866,071	+15.5% ▲
2012	2,693,151	12,164,938	14,858,089	−0.1% ▼
2013	2,431,632	12,847,362	15,278,994	+2.8% ▲
2014	2,507,123	13,441,715	15,948,838	+4.4% ▲
2015	2,591,724	13,830,542	16,422,266	+3.0% ▲
2016	2,679,885	14,504,542	17,184,427	+4.6% ▲
2017	2,731,454	16,160,932	18,892,386	+9.9% ▲
2018	2,955,100	17,893,649	20,848,749	+10.4% ▲
2019	2,929,779	18,931,303	21,861,082	+4.9% ▲
2020	998,524	4,054,682	5,053,206	−76.9% ▼
2021	855,924	3,405,611	4,261,535	−15.7% ▼
2022	1,691,005	11,191,856	12,882,861	+202.3% ▲
2023	1,782,914	13,530,009	15,312,923	+18.9% ▲
2024	1,855,141	14,453,837	16,308,978	+6.5% ▲
2025	1,844,513	15,135,774	16,980,287	+4.1% ▲

== Ground transport ==
The airport is located in the immediate vicinity of Ring III and Finnish national road 45. The airport is also connected to the Helsinki commuter rail system and the local bus network.

=== Rail ===
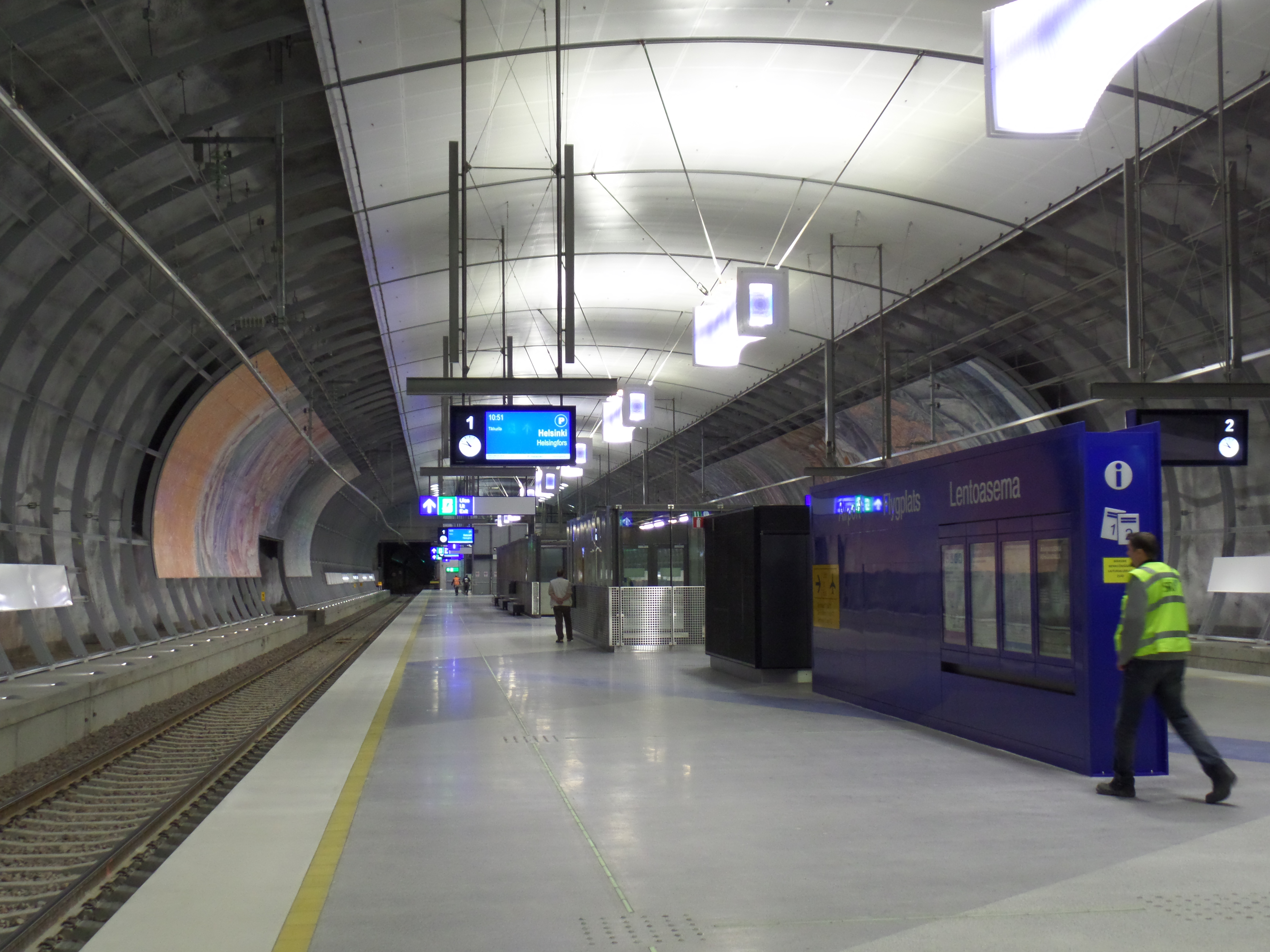
Helsinki Airport Railway Station

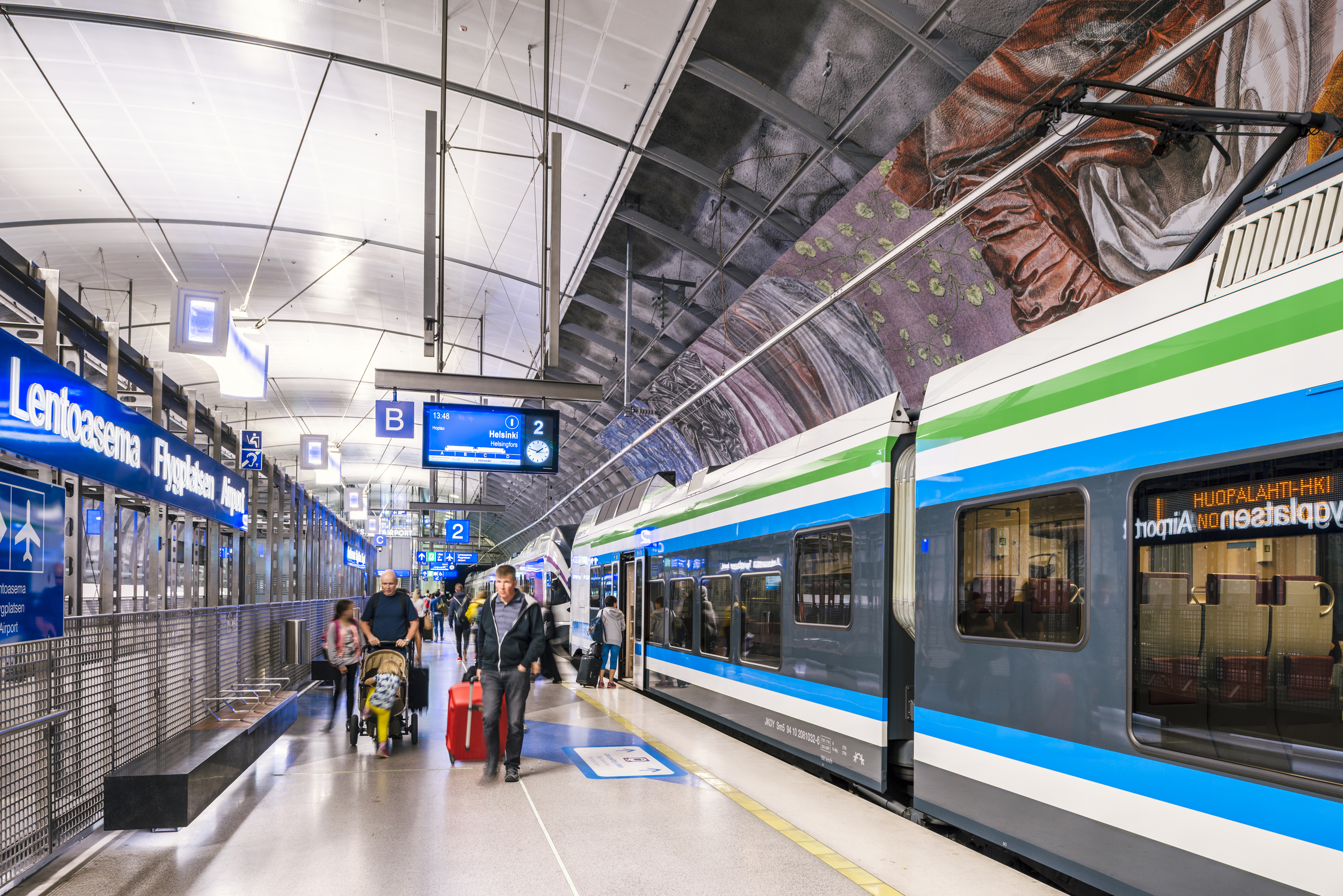
Helsinki Airport Railway Station

The railway link to the airport opened for traffic in July 2015 and serves local commuter trains, which run every 10 minutes during the day and every 15 to 30 minutes in the evenings and early mornings. All services are operated with the JKOY Class Sm5 Stadler FLIRT trains, operated by the VR Group under contract for HSL.

Services run as a loop and retain their line code for the entire journey. I trains run anti-clockwise and take 34 minutes to reach Helsinki, via Myyrmäki, while P trains run clockwise and take 29 minutes to reach Helsinki. P trains also call at Tikkurila, an important interchange with domestic long-distance and night trains. While the last I train leaves the airport just after midnight, P trains run until 1.22 (2.22 at weekends).

Plans also exist for a direct connection between Helsinki Central, the airport, and the long-distance rail network via Kerava. This line, known as Lentorata, is projected to run in a tunnel for most of its approximately 30 km length.

=== Taxi ===
Taxi rank is located adjacent to the terminal. Since 1 January 2025, only the four companies contracted to Finavia, FixuTaxi, Taksi Helsinki, Menevä, and Lähitaksi are allowed to use it. Other taxi companies can use an area dedicated for pre-booked and app rides inside parking lot P2.

=== Bus ===
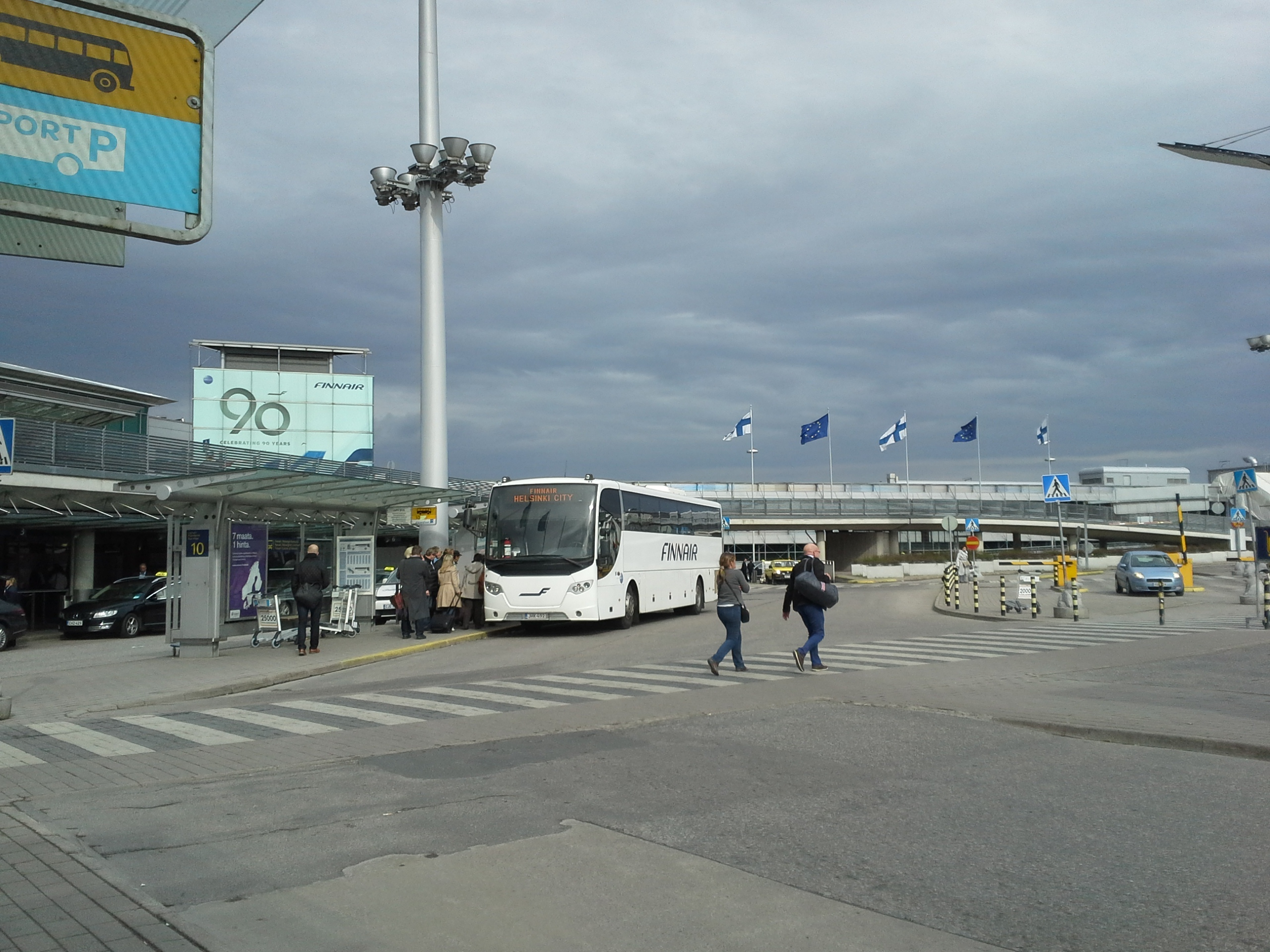
Outside Helsinki-Vantaa Airport before the new terminal building

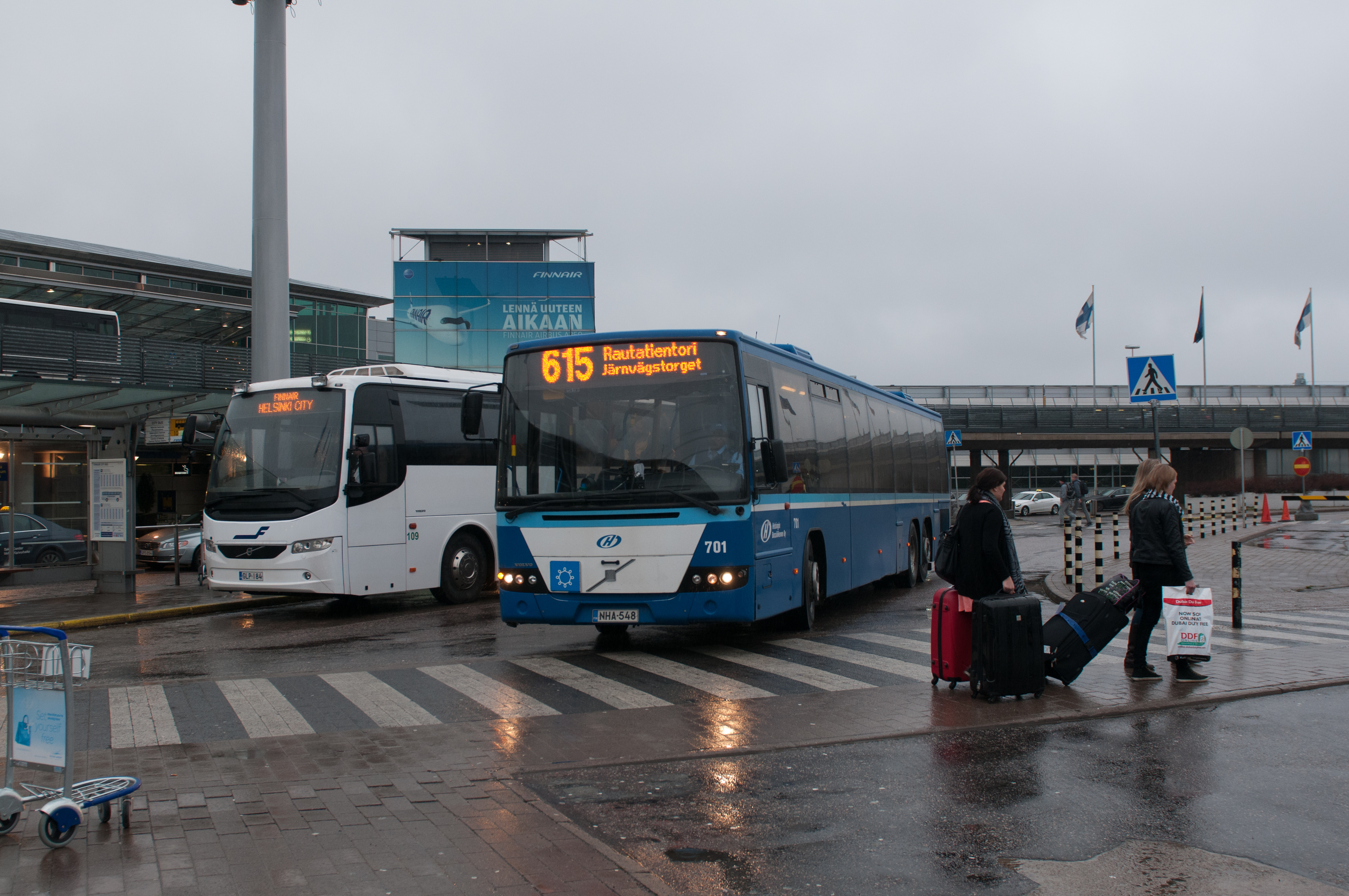
A Finnair City Bus and a Helsinki Regional Transport Authority bus on line 615 at the airport in 2015

The local transport authority, HSL, runs frequent bus services from the airport to various destinations around Helsinki. Trunk buses 570 and 600 runs 24 hours a day and provide connections to Tikkurila and Mellunmäki (570) and central Helsinki (600). In addition, night buses 415N and 431N run instead of train services at night, connecting the airport with Myyrmäki (415N) and Kivistö (431N), before also running to central Helsinki. Finally, line 562 runs via Malmi to Itäkeskus.

Coach connections to Tampere and Turku are provided by various operators.

Until 2020 the Finnair City Bus, operated by Pohjolan Liikenne, provided a direct bus connection from the Eliel Square in central Helsinki to the airport. In the spring of 2020, the service was suspended because of the COVID-19 pandemic, and in the autumn of 2020, Pohjolan Liikenne announced it would discontinue the service permanently. The service operated for the last time on 22 March 2020.

Finnair operates bus connections from Helsinki Airport to Turku Bus Station and Tampere Bus Station

=== Parking ===
In August 2016, there were about 13 thousand parking spaces at the Helsinki Airport. Some of the spaces were taken out of use in January 2019 when the parking garage P1/P2 located near the terminal was dismantled to make way for the new entrance to the airport.

The airport has two parking garages (P3 and P5) as well as two outdoor parking areas (P4A and P4B).

There are also companies providing airport parking services near the airport, where passengers can leave their cars in a guarded area and get transport to the airport.

== Accidents and incidents ==
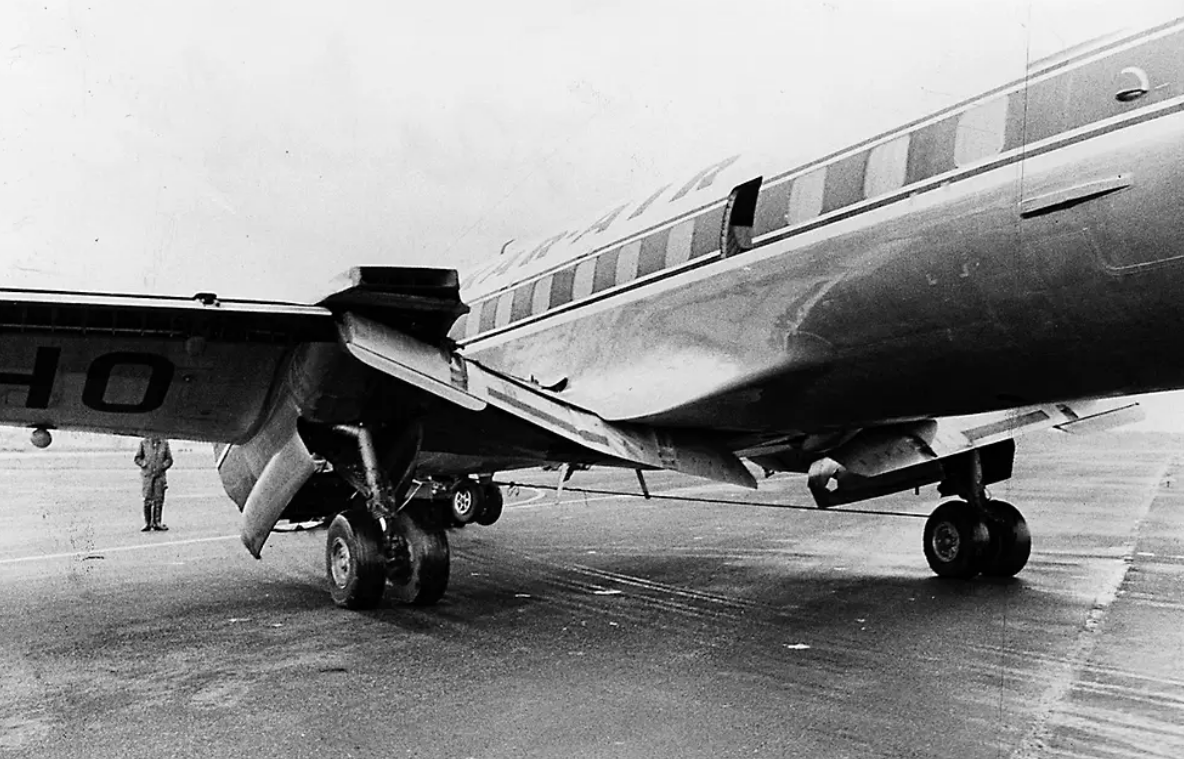
Karair's OH-VKN after its failed landing

- On 2 December 1957, the approach of an Aeroflot Ilyushin Il-14 from Leningrad went too far in the thick fog, and the pilots failed to stop the plane until the end of the runway. The plane overran the runway and finally stopped at a highway embankment to the south of the airport area. The plane was carrying sixteen passengers and five crewmembers, of which ten people were injured. The accident site was closed off. There was no attempt to fix the plane in Finland. The plane was the size of a Convair Metropolitan, and it was disassembled and taken to the Soviet Union by car.
- On 19 August 1963, a Karair Convair CV-440 Metropolitan (OH-VKM) was damaged during landing to Helsinki Airport. During the landing in a thunderstorm the plane bounced three times off the runway and finally its nose wheel assembly broke. The plane fell down on its nose, both of its propellers hit the ground and the plane dragged along the runway for 1300 metres. The plane was fixed by January the next year and remained in service until 1973.
- On 21 August 1963, another Karair Convair CV-440-98 Metropolitan (OH-VKN) was damaged during landing to Helsinki Airport. The plane bounced three times off the runway, and on its last impact its nose wheel assembly broke, and the left middle wing was bent and twisted. The plane fell down on its nose, its propellers hit the ground, and the plane finally dragged onto the lawn to the left of the runway. Both Convair Metropolitan accidents were partly caused because air traffic control had been forbidden to provide complete information about the weather at the airport to approaching planes. Only the direction and speed of the wind were reported, not any approaching or present thunderstorms. The pilot of OH-VKN lost sight of the airport at a critical moment because of heavy rain and temporary blindness caused by a lightning flash.
- On 10 July 1977, two young Soviet men hijacked an Aeroflot Tupolev Tu-134 traveling from Petrozavodsk to Leningrad, trying to get to Stockholm. Because of lack of fuel, the plane had to land at Helsinki Airport. The hijacking situation lasted for three days, after which the hijackers surrendered to the police and were transported back to the Soviet Union.
- On 31 January 2005, a Nord-Flyg AB Cessna C208B on a cargo flight to Sweden crashed on the ground between the first and third runways soon after take-off. The reason of the accident was stalling caused by snow and ice left on the upper surface of the wing. The pilot, the only person on the plane, was slightly injured in the accident.

== Future expansion and plans ==
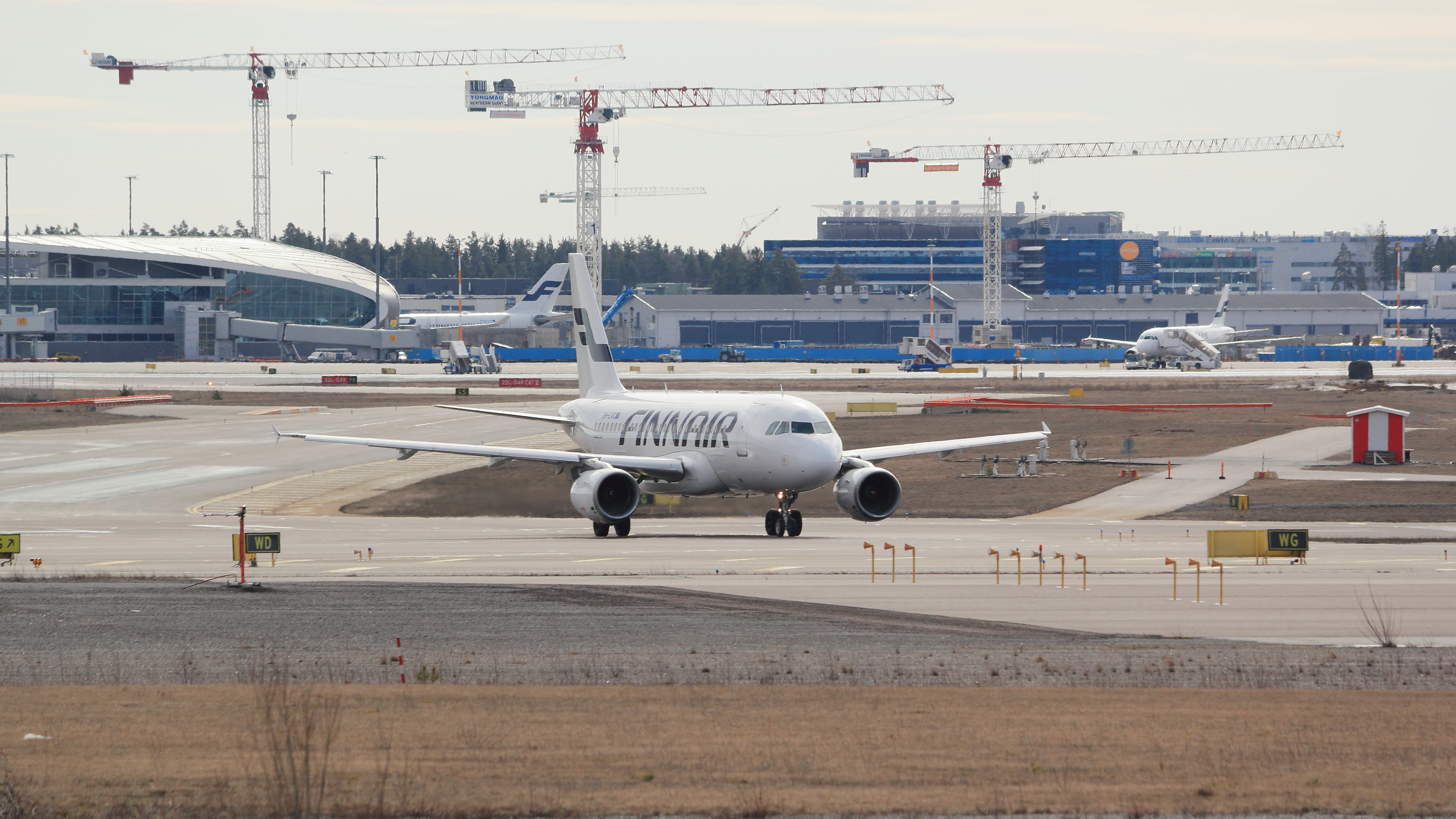
Finnair Airbus A319 taxiing. Terminal expansion construction site in the background.

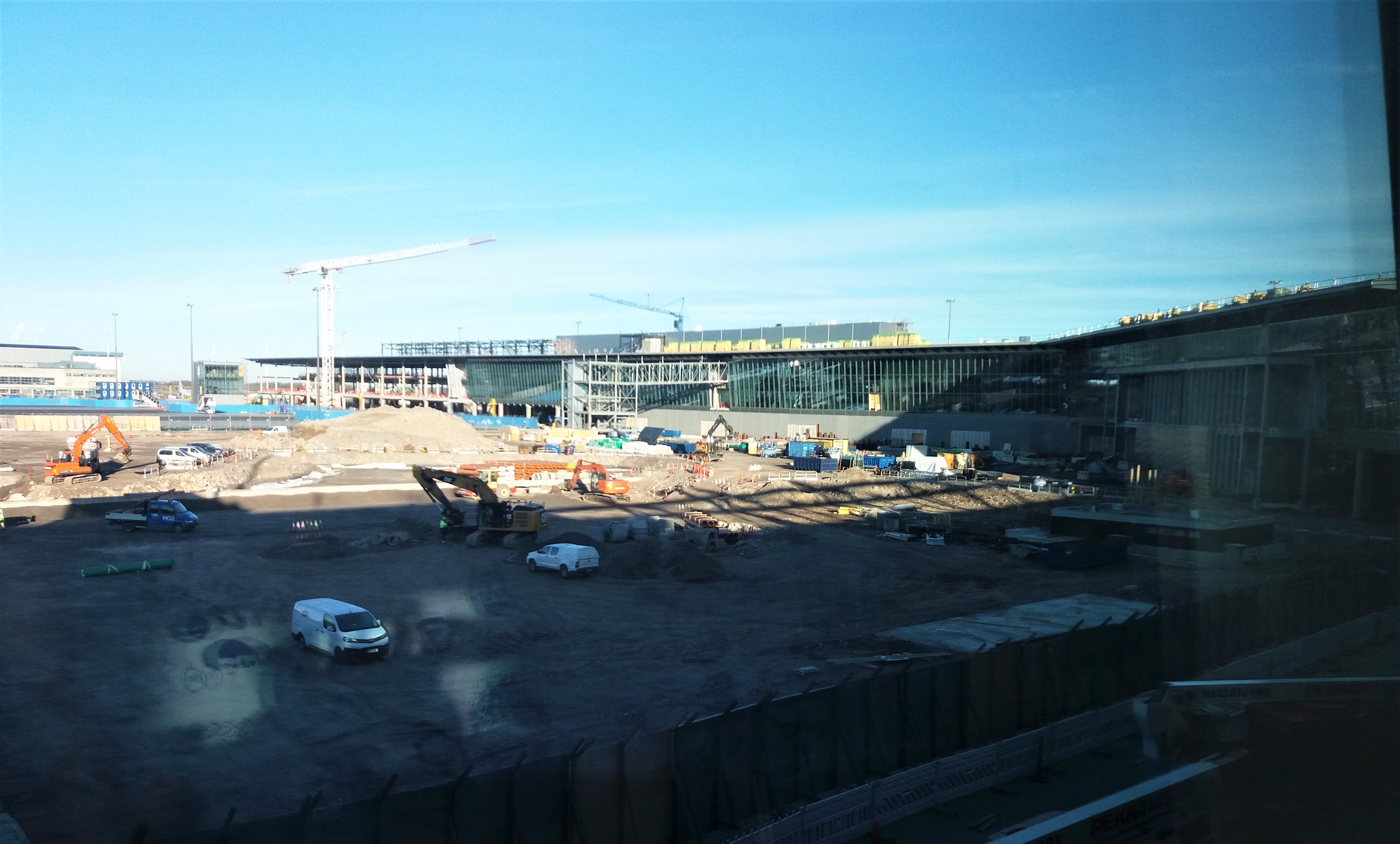
Terminal 2 non-Schengen expansion site

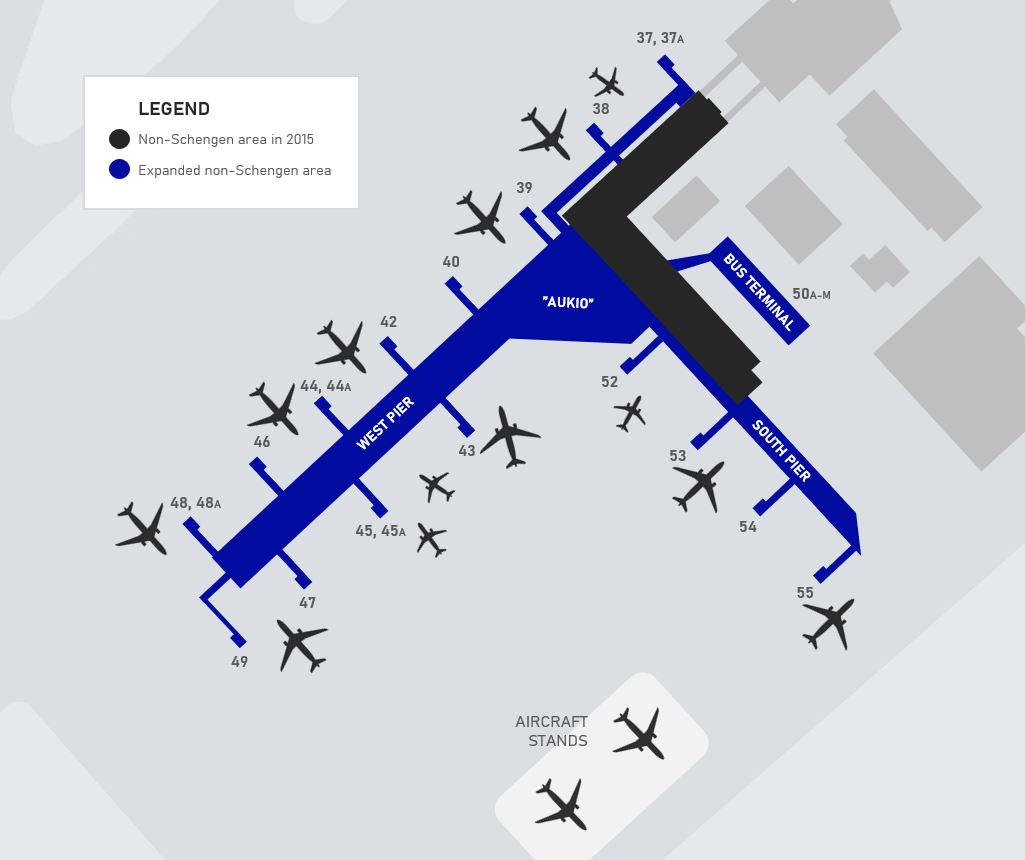
Expansion of non-Schengen area at Helsinki Airport

=== Master plan 2020 ===
In October 2013, Finavia received a capital injection of €200,000,000 from the Finnish Government. The investment enabled Finavia to start a development program worth €900,000,000 at Helsinki Airport, aiming at maintaining the strong position of Helsinki Airport in transit traffic between Europe and Asia. The program started in January 2014 and is planned to last until February 2020. It is expected to generate about 14,000 person-years of employment. Helsinki Airport was expected to serve 20 million passengers per year by 2020 and create about 5,000 new jobs at the airport. However, the airport served almost 21 million passengers in 2018; two years before the target. The expansion will increase capacity at the airport to 30 million passengers. In order to achieve this, the airport will expand both of its terminals and open a new entrance in place of the current parking and public transport area. The development program ended in the autumn of 2023.

The Suomi-rata project, started in 2019, aims to build a new railway connection to the airport. It would create a new, twice as fast connection from the airport to the Helsinki Central railway station as well as a connection to the Finnish Main Line, allowing direct rail access to the airport also from elsewhere in Finland.

==== Development timeline ====
Among the completed projects are:

- Renewal of Baggage Claim Hall 2B – completed January 2015
- Renovation of Arrival Hall 2A – completed June 2015
- Train connection – completed July 2015
- Renovation of Runway 1 – completed August 2015
- New bus terminal for remote aircraft stand operations – completed June 2016
- 3,000 new parking spaces – completed August 2016
- New aircraft engine test site – completed October 2016
- The new south pier – completed June 2017
- Finnair's new cargo terminal – late 2017
- Scandic hotel – completed March 2018
- Aukio – completed February 2019
- Expansion of Terminal 1 – completed 10 April 2019
- Expansion of border control – completed July 2019
- The new west pier – completed November 2019
- Gate area 17-19 expansion – completed December 2019
- Gate area 34-36 expansion – completed September 2021
- New entrance – completed December 2021
- New departure hall and new security control area – 2022
- Expansion of Schengen gate area – 2023

==== Terminal expansion ====
Helsinki Airport has capacity for about 17 million passengers annually, although this number was passed in 2016. Finavia decided to expand the current terminal building to respond to the expected passenger growth within the following years.

Part of the plan was to build a satellite terminal next to Terminal 2, but the plan was cancelled in favour of expansion under a single terminal building. In September 2014, Finavia revealed more detailed plans for the future expansion that will take place between 2014 and 2020. According to the plan Terminals 1 and 2 will be combined and expanded under one roof. This expansion work is one of Finland's largest construction projects. The expansion was designed by the Finnish architects' office PES-Architects. The same office designed the previous Helsinki Airport expansions completed in 1996 and 1999, as well as the circular parking buildings in front of the terminal. The surface area will increase by 45%, luggage handling capacity will increase by 50%. The entire surface area of the terminal in 2020 will be approximately 250,000 square metres (2,700,000 sq ft).

===== Expansion of Terminal 1 =====
Finavia plans to expand Terminal 1, which is used for flights within the Schengen area. The construction is scheduled to be started in November 2017. Terminal 1 will be expanded by four separate departure gate buildings which will be connected by walking corridors. Each building will have one departure gate excluding one, which will have three gates. Gates (5–11) will not be equipped with jet bridges. Buildings will have two floors.

===== Expansion of Terminal 2 =====
Terminal 2 will have new gates (eight additional gates to Terminal 2) and aircraft stands on the apron. All gates for long-haul flights will have double jet bridges (such as the ones at Incheon International Airport) to enable handling larger aircraft more efficiently. Finavia has signed a contract with Thyssen Krupp Airport Systems for 16 widebody aircraft stands with up to 33 new jet bridges. New jet bridges were installed to gates 38 and 39 (now 53 and 54). Gate 48 can accommodate the Airbus A380 superjumbo and there are new aircraft stands on the apron accommodating the A380. Five of the gates will be able to accommodate two regional jets, such as Boeing 737s or Airbus A320s, simultaneously at a single gate. Two of these gates are located at West Pier.

In June 2016, the new bus terminal for remote aircraft stand operations was opened to increase the airport's capacity with gates 50A-M.

The new South Pier of Terminal 2 was inaugurated on 10 July 2017. The first scheduled flight from the new pier, AY006 departed from Gate 54 to New York City. The new pier covers 8,300 square metres (89,000 sq ft). In addition to the new terminal building, new dual boarding gates S54 and S55 as well as aircraft stands 171 and 172 were opened. Construction of the southern wing of Terminal 2 started on 4 January 2016. The construction took around 18 months. There are two floors: one for arriving passengers, the other for departures and gates 52 to 55. All the gates have dual boarding jet bridges. The new wing also features the first moving walkway at any airport in Finland.

On 20 September 2016, the construction on the West Pier began, even though it was expected to start in the summer of 2017. The first part of the west wing was expected to be finished in April 2019, while the entire pier was completed in October 2019. The west wing represents some €300,000,000 of Finavia's substantial total investment of €900,000,000. The first part of the west wing built is the large central plaza, "Aukio", which was opened in February 2019. It brings 25,000 square metres (270,000 sq ft) of new passenger and baggage facilities to the airport. The pier is equipped with nine gates for widebody jets. Gate 48 is able to accommodate the Airbus A380.

The area of the apron to be renovated covers a total of 157,000 square metres (1,690,000 sq ft).

The Helsinki Airport development program also includes plans to expand Terminal 2 to the area currently used for parking and public transport. This would provide more space for check-in, security control and baggage operations, allowing the airport to concentrate all departure and arrival services in a single terminal. On 1 December 2021, a new multimodal travel center will be opened in connection with Terminal 2, among other things, to streamline access to the airport from the train station and bus terminal.

==== New cargo terminal ====
The construction of a new freight terminal (35,000 m^{2} or 380,000 sq ft) began in March 2015. The capacity of the terminal is being expanded to accommodate the growing freight capacity that will be provided by Finnair's Airbus A350 XWB fleet. Finnair's freight operations will continue in the current location until relocation to the new freight terminal in the spring of 2017.

==== Contextual engine ====
Part of the rehaul of Helsinki Airport has included the development of a contextual engine that uses artificial intelligence to digest passenger data in ways that make passing through the airport a more pleasant experience. The benefits come from an array of small improvements; for example, digital signs change language according to the nationalities of those getting off a flight. Passengers are also continuously kept abreast of how long it will take them to reach their gates or pass through security control. Monocle named the contextual engine built by technology firm Reaktor as one of the top transportation innovations of 2018.

=== Planned third terminal ===
In addition to the terminal expansion, Finavia has also contemplated building a third terminal at Helsinki Airport. According to Finavia's tentative plan, the new terminal would be located between runways 04R/22L and 04L/22R, while runway 15/33 would be removed. The terminal would be the principal terminal at the airport but the check-in area would stay in the current terminal building. The decision to build the third terminal has not yet been taken.

== See also ==
- List of the busiest airports in the Nordic countries
