= Finnish Air Force =

Branch of the Finnish Defence Forces

- Ilmavoimat (Finnish); Flygvapnet (Swedish)
- Badge of the Finnish Air Force
- Founded: 6 March 1918; 108 years ago
- Country: Finland
- Branch: Air force
- Role: Aerial warfare
- Size: 3,100 active personnel; 38,000 reserve personnel
- Part of: Finnish Defence Forces
- Mottos: Latin: Qualitas Potentia Nostra; (English: "Quality is our Strength")
- Total aircraft: 159
- Engagements: Finnish Civil War; Winter War; Continuation War; Lapland War
- Website: Finnish Air Force.fi

Commanders
- Commander: Major-General Timo Herranen
- Notable commanders: Arne Somersalo; Jarl Lundqvist; Jarmo Lindberg

Insignia
- Roundel

Aircraft flown
- Electronic warfare: Airbus C-295M
- Fighter: Boeing F/A-18C Hornet Lockheed Martin F-35 Lightning II
- Trainer: BAE Hawk 50/51/60; Grob G 115E; Boeing F/A-18D Hornet
- Transport: Learjet 35-A/S; Airbus C-295M

The Finnish Air Force (FAF or FiAF; Finnish: Ilmavoimat, lit. 'Air forces' [ˈilmɑˌʋoi̯mɑt]; Swedish: Flygvapnet, lit. 'Air arm') is the aerial warfare branch of the Finnish Defence Forces. Its primary peacetime tasks include airspace surveillance, identification and interception missions, and maintaining operational readiness for wartime operations. The Finnish Air Force was founded on 6 March 1918.

== History ==
The origins of Finnish military aviation date to the final years of Russian rule, when Russian military aircraft were stationed in the Grand Duchy of Finland, then an autonomous part of the Russian Empire. Following the Finnish Declaration of Independence on 6 December 1917, the Finnish Civil War broke out in January 1918 between the socialist Reds, supported by Soviet Russia, and the conservative Whites. The White Guard managed to capture a small number of aircraft from Russian forces, but initially relied heavily on foreign assistance for pilots and equipment. Although Sweden officially declined to provide military support, individual Swedish volunteers assisted the Finnish government. One such contribution was organized by Valdemar Langlet, editor of the Swedish newspaper Aftonbladet, who raised funds through the organization Finlands vänner (Swedish for 'Friends of Finland') to purchase a N.A.B. Albatros aircraft from the Nordiska Aviatik A.B. company.

This aircraft, the first to enter service with the Finnish Air Force, was flown from Sweden to Finland via Haparanda on 25 February 1918 by Swedish pilot John-Allan Hygerth and Per Svanbäck. Hygerth later became the first commander of the Finnish Air Force on 10 March 1918. During the delivery flight, the aircraft stopped at Kokkola and made a forced landing at Jakobstad due to engine failure. It was subsequently assigned the designation F.2, derived from the Swedish word Flygmaskin ("aircraft").

=== Insignia of the Finnish Air Force (1918–1945) ===
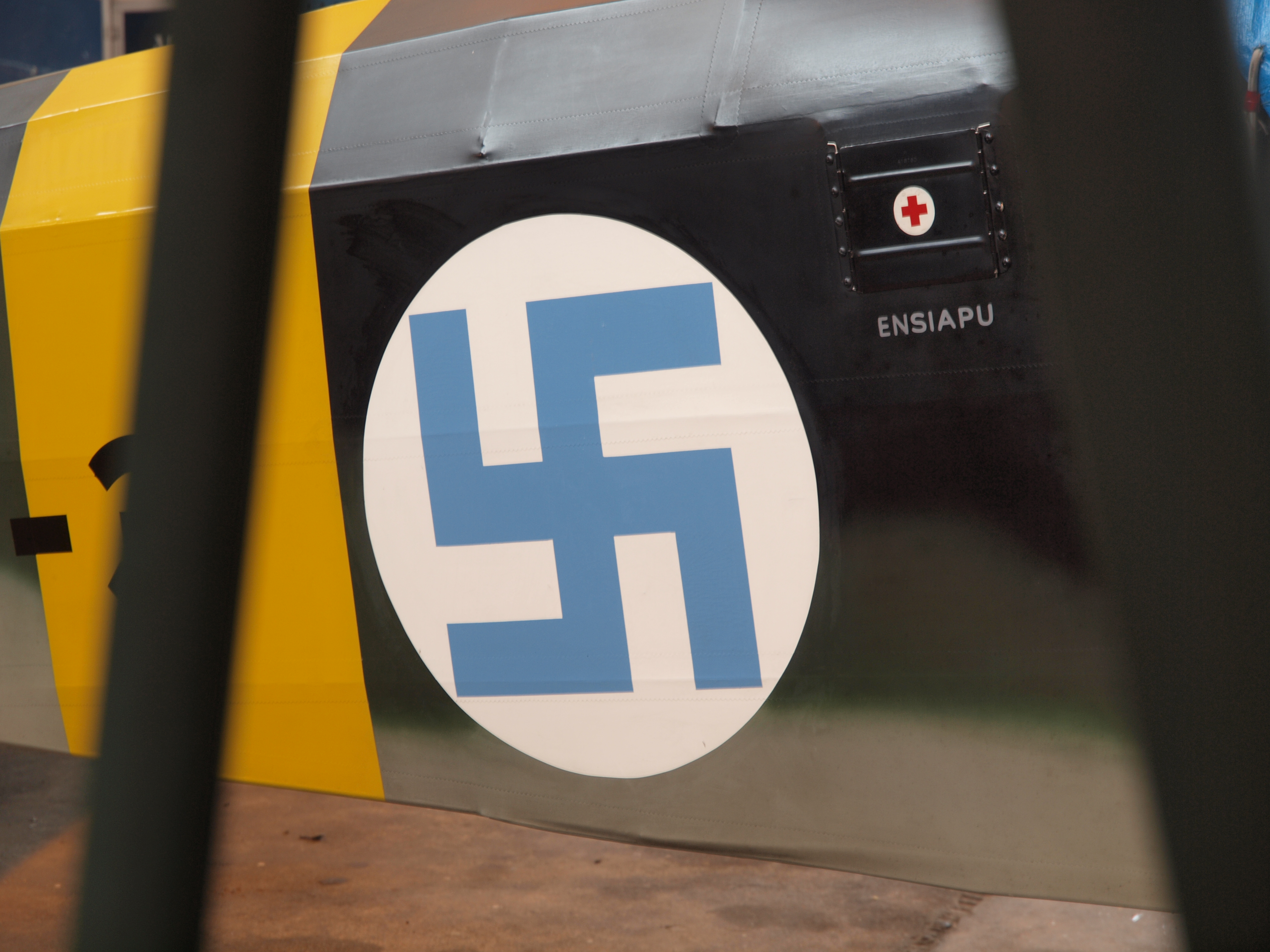
The Finnish Air Force aircraft insignia used from 1918 to 1945, shown on a VL Viima

The Finnish Air Force adopted its insignia following the donation of its second aircraft, a Morane-Saulnier Type L built under licence by AB Thulinverken, by Swedish count Eric von Rosen. Von Rosen had painted his personal symbol, a blue swastika, on the aircraft. The swastika was at that time used in various cultures as a symbol associated with good fortune and had no political or ideological connection to later National Socialist use. This symbol was subsequently adopted as the official insignia of the Finnish Air Force. The white circular background originated when Finnish personnel painted over the original Thulin factory markings. The swastika was formally adopted as the Finnish Air Force insignia by order of Commander-in-Chief C. G. E. Mannerheim on 18 March 1918. Following the Moscow Armistice in September 1944, Finland was required to remove symbols associated with fascism under the supervision of the Allied Control Commission. As a result, the Finnish Air Force replaced the swastika insignia on its aircraft. The symbol continued to appear in certain unit emblems, flags, and decorations after the war. In 2020, the Finnish Air Force removed the swastika from the emblem of the Air Force Command.

=== First aircraft ===
The aircraft donated by Eric von Rosen received the designation F.1. Its pilot, Lieutenant Nils Kindberg, flew the aircraft to Vaasa on 6 March 1918, carrying von Rosen as a passenger. Because the flight had been conducted without official permission and contravened Swedish government policy, Kindberg was fined 100 kronor upon his return to Sweden. The arrival of F.1 is regarded by the Finnish Air Force as the birth of Finnish military aviation, and 6 March is commemorated as the founding date of the service. However, the aircraft was destroyed in an accident later that year, resulting in the deaths of its crew.

During its early period, the Finnish Air Force also operated several aircraft obtained from Russian pilots who had defected during the Finnish Civil War, as well as additional aircraft purchased abroad or received as donations. On 7 September 1920, two newly acquired SIAI S.9 flying boats crashed in the Swiss Alps while being ferried to Finland, killing all four people on board—three Finns and one Italian. Since 1922, the date has been observed as a memorial day for Finnish airmen killed in service.

The Finnish Air Force assigns aircraft serial numbers using a two-letter type code followed by a hyphen and an individual number. The type code typically refers to the aircraft type or name, for example HN for the F/A-18 Hornet, DK for the Saab 35 Draken, and VN for the Valmet L-70 Vinka.

=== Finnish Civil War ===
==== Air operations of the Reds ====
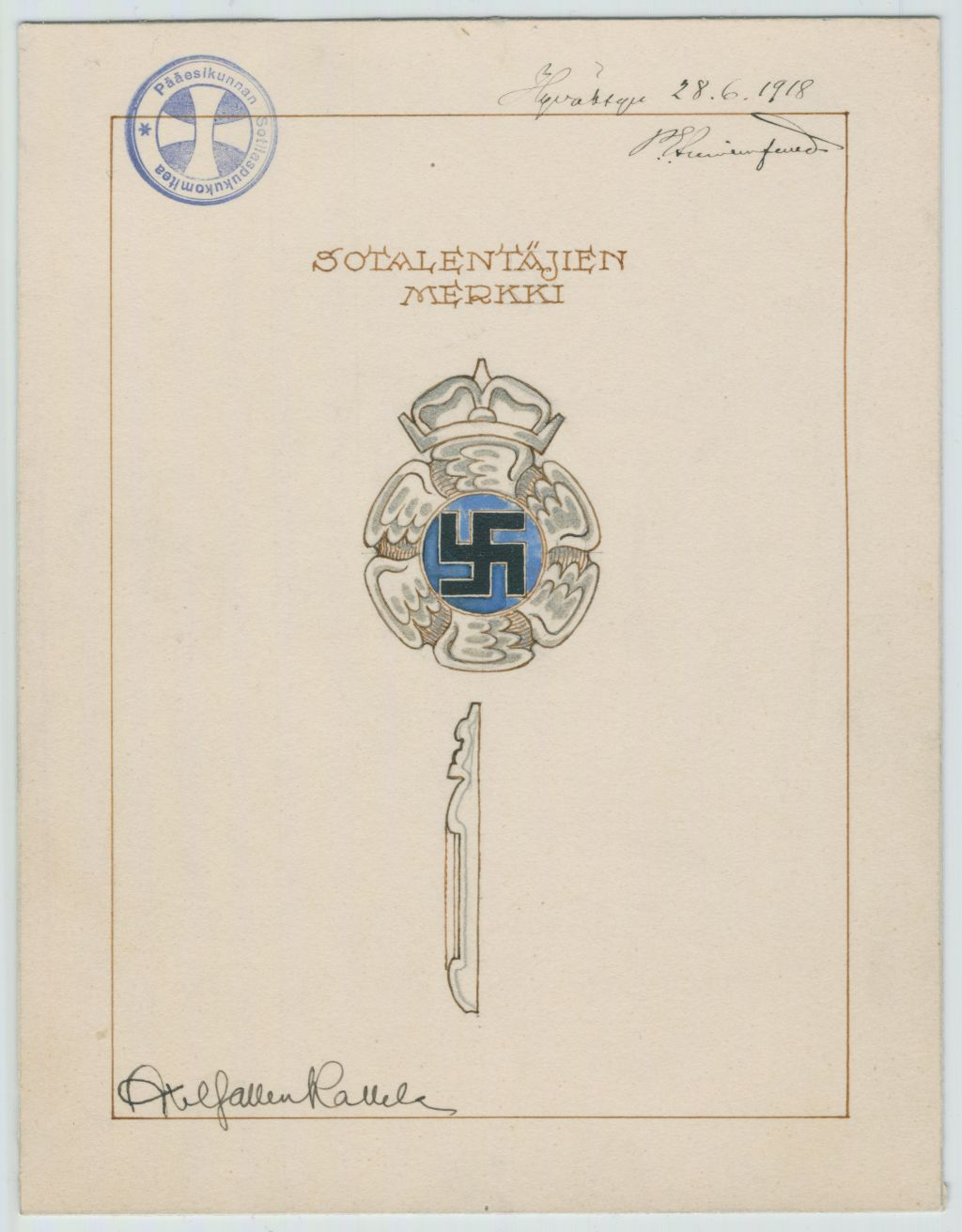
Pilot badge of the Finnish Air Force used from 1918 to 1945, designed by Akseli Gallen-Kallela

Following the withdrawal of Russian forces from Finland after the Russian Revolution, several aircraft and airbases remained. Most of these were taken over by the White forces, but the Reds retained control of some airbases and aircraft. In total, the Reds had approximately 12 aircraft, mainly amphibious types. As they had no trained Finnish pilots, they relied on Russian pilots who had remained in Finland.

On 24 February 1918, five aircraft arrived in Viipuri and were soon transferred to Riihimäki. The Reds established air units in Helsinki, Tampere, Kouvola, and Viipuri. There was no centralized command structure; instead, air units operated under local front commanders. A flight school was established in Helsinki, but no pilots were trained before the city fell to White forces.

Two aircraft, a reconnaissance Nieuport 10 and a Nieuport 17 fighter, were sent to Tampere, while three were based in Kouvola. Four Russian pilots and six mechanics also arrived in Tampere. The first Red combat sortie was flown on 1 March 1918 over Naistenlahti. Red air operations consisted primarily of reconnaissance, artillery spotting, bombing missions, and propaganda leaflet drops. Their effectiveness was limited due to poor coordination, aging aircraft, and shortages of trained personnel. Some aircraft were captured by the Whites, while others were destroyed or abandoned.

==== Air operations of the Whites ====
At the start of the war, the Whites had no aircraft or trained pilots and sought assistance from Sweden. Although the Swedish government, as a neutral party, refused official military support, private Swedish volunteers provided aircraft and personnel.

By late February 1918, one Morane-Saulnier Parasol and three N.A.B. Albatros aircraft had arrived from Sweden. Two were donated by private individuals and one was purchased. However, these aircraft were of limited operational value.

Due to the lack of trained Finnish personnel, most pilots and mechanics were foreign volunteers. These included Swedish, Danish, Russian, and Finnish personnel, many of whom had limited military aviation experience. During the Civil War, the White air force included:

- 29 Swedes (16 pilots, two observers, and 11 mechanics)
- 2 Danes (one pilot and one observer)
- 7 Russians (six pilots and one observer)
- 28 Finns (four pilots, six observers, two engineers, and 16 mechanics)

White air operations were primarily limited to reconnaissance missions. German forces operating in Finland also deployed aircraft, but their contribution to Finnish air operations was limited.

The first Finnish air base was established on the shore of a lake near Kolho. The first aircraft arrived there by rail on 7 March 1918, and flight operations began on 17 March. During the war, the Whites captured nine Russian Stetinin M-9 aircraft.

The first White reconnaissance mission was flown over Lyly. As the front advanced, the main base was relocated to Orivesi and later to Kaukajärvi near Tampere. Swedish Lieutenant John-Allan Hygerth commanded the Finnish Air Force from 10 March 1918 until he was replaced on 18 April 1918. German Captain Carl Seber assumed command on 28 April 1918 and remained in the position until December 1918.

By the end of the war, the Finnish Air Force possessed approximately 40 aircraft. Of these, around 20 had been captured from Red forces or found abandoned. Additional aircraft were obtained from Germany, Sweden, and other foreign sources.

=== Interwar period ===
Following the Finnish Civil War, the Finnish Air Force—then known as the Aviation Force (Ilmailuvoimat)—was organised into four main air stations. Santahamina operated both landplanes and seaplanes, while Sortavala and Koivisto were seaplane bases, and Utti operated landplanes. In addition, a Flying Battalion was responsible for aircraft maintenance and the training of pilots and mechanics.

In its early years, the organisation relied heavily on foreign expertise. German instructors initially played a central role, followed by French instructors after Germany’s defeat in 1918, and later British instructors from the mid-1920s. Over time, the Finnish Air Force developed its own training and operational capabilities.

From 1922 onwards, the most important aircraft type was the German Hansa-Brandenburg W.33, produced domestically under licence by the Aviation Force Aircraft Factory as the I.V.L A.22. The first aircraft of indigenous design, the VL Sääski primary trainer, entered service in 1928. During the early 1920s, Finnish military aviation focused primarily on maritime reconnaissance. Fighter pilot training began in 1923, and the introduction of the Gloster Gamecock in 1927 marked a shift towards land-based fighter operations. During the 1930s, the Fokker D.XIII served as the main fighter aircraft, while the Bristol Blenheim and Fokker C.X formed the backbone of the bomber force. During the 1930s, the Air Force was reorganised from air stations into flying regiments consisting of fighter, bomber, and reconnaissance squadrons. On the eve of the Winter War in 1939, the Finnish Air Force had approximately 100 aircraft. Pilot training began in October 1918 within the Flying Battalion. This unit was renamed the Aviation Battalion in 1919 and the Aviation School in 1923. After operating in Turku and Santahamina, the school was relocated to Kauhava in 1928. In 1938, it was renamed the Air Warfare School.

=== Winter War (1939–1940) ===
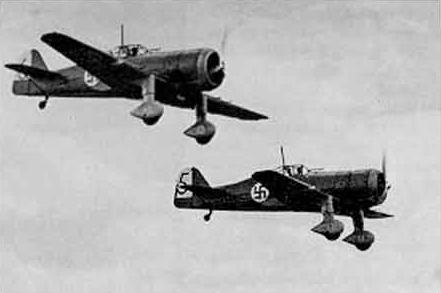
Fokker D.XXI fighter in Finnish Air Force service during World War II

The Winter War began on 30 November 1939 with large-scale bombing raids by the Soviet Air Force against Finnish cities and military targets. In 1939, the Soviet Union possessed approximately 5,000 aircraft, of which around 700 fighters and 800 medium bombers were deployed against Finland in support of Red Army operations. Despite the scale of the attacks, the overall damage to Finnish industry and infrastructure was limited.

At the outbreak of the war, the Finnish Air Force had 18 Bristol Blenheim bombers and 46 fighter aircraft, consisting of 32 Fokker D.XXI and 14 Bristol Bulldog fighters. In addition, there were 58 liaison and utility aircraft, although many of these were unsuitable for combat operations. The Fokker D.XXI, the main Finnish fighter, was relatively slow but highly manoeuvrable and well suited to Finnish conditions.

Although greatly outnumbered, the Finnish Air Force had adopted modern tactics, including the finger-four formation, during the mid-1930s. These tactics proved more effective than the older vic formation still used by many air forces at the time.

To reduce losses on the ground, Finnish aircraft were dispersed among numerous airfields and concealed in forests. Decoy aircraft and protective revetments were also used. These measures significantly reduced the effectiveness of Soviet airfield attacks.

During the war, Finland acquired additional aircraft from abroad, resulting in a highly diverse inventory that included American, British, French, Italian, German, Swedish, and captured Soviet aircraft. Many of these aircraft entered service only toward the end of the conflict or during the subsequent Continuation War.

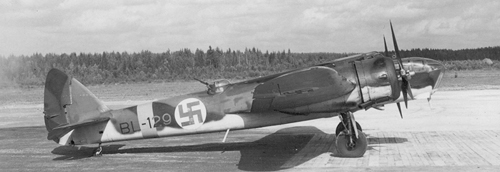
Bristol Blenheim BL-129 of No. 44 Squadron, Finnish Air Force

Finnish fighter tactics emphasised attacking Soviet bombers while avoiding combat with escorting fighters whenever possible. Finnish pilots used surprise, superior situational awareness, and coordinated formations to offset numerical and technical disadvantages.

During the Winter War, Finnish fighter aircraft were credited with shooting down 218 Soviet aircraft, while losing 47 aircraft in air combat. Finnish anti-aircraft defences destroyed an additional 314 Soviet aircraft. Approximately 30 Soviet aircraft were captured after making forced landings in Finnish territory and were later repaired and used by Finnish forces.

=== Continuation War (1941–1944) ===
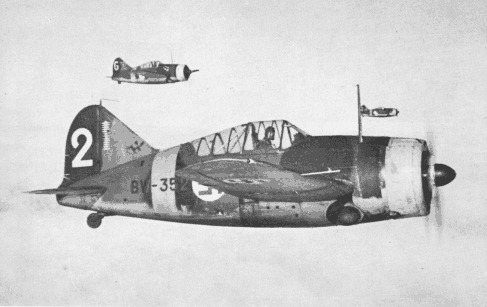
Brewster F2A Buffalo fighters in Finnish service during the Continuation War

When the Continuation War began in June 1941, the Finnish Air Force was significantly stronger than it had been during the Winter War. Its strength had increased to approximately 550 aircraft, although many were older models or export variants. Aircraft acquired during and after the Winter War included British Hawker Hurricane fighters, French Morane-Saulnier M.S.406 fighters, Italian Fiat G.50 fighters, and American-built Brewster F2A Buffalo fighters. Germany also supplied captured French Curtiss Hawk 75 fighters and later provided more modern aircraft. In addition, Finland repaired and operated captured Soviet aircraft, including Tupolev SB, Ilyushin DB-3, and Polikarpov I-153 types.

The primary mission of the Finnish Air Force was to defend Finnish-controlled territory and support ground operations by limiting Soviet air activity. Finnish fighter units achieved considerable success, particularly during the Finnish offensive phase in 1941. The Brewster Buffalo served as the principal Finnish fighter until 1943 and proved effective in Finnish service despite its poor reputation elsewhere. Finnish pilots flying the type were credited with 459 victories for the loss of 15 aircraft in air combat.

From 1943 onwards, the German Messerschmitt Bf 109 became the Finnish Air Force’s main front-line fighter. Other fighter types, including the Fiat G.50 and Curtiss Hawk 75, also remained in service. Reconnaissance operations were supported by aircraft such as the German Arado Ar 196 and various domestically operated and captured aircraft.

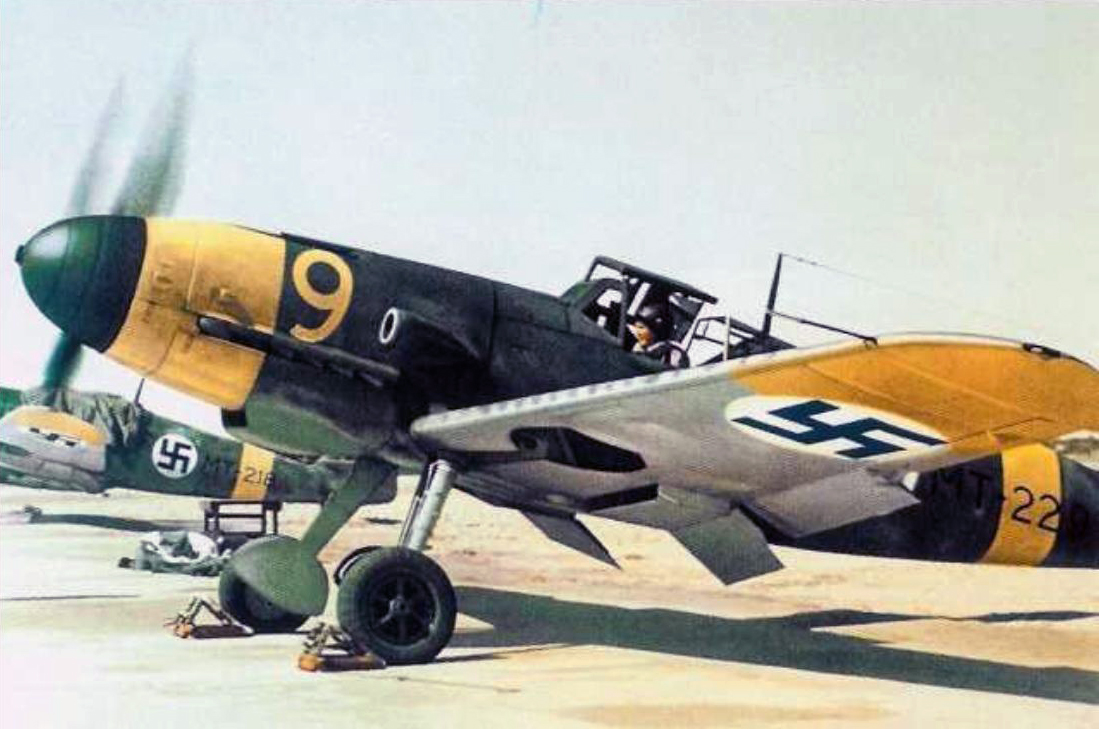
Finnish Messerschmitt Bf 109 G-2 fighters

The bomber force was strengthened with the addition of German-supplied Junkers Ju 88 bombers and Dornier Do 17 aircraft, as well as captured Soviet bombers. Finnish bomber units conducted reconnaissance, interdiction, and close-support missions. These aircraft played an important role in defensive operations during major Soviet offensives in 1944, including the Battle of Tali-Ihantala. Maintenance and logistics remained challenging throughout the war. Spare parts for aircraft of American, British, and Italian origin were often difficult to obtain. The Finnish State Aircraft Factory was responsible for maintaining a diverse fleet and repairing captured aircraft.

Following the Moscow Armistice in September 1944, Finland was required to expel German forces from its territory. This resulted in limited air combat between Finnish and German aircraft during the subsequent Lapland War. During the Continuation War, Finnish fighter pilots were credited with shooting down 1,621 Soviet aircraft, while the Finnish Air Force lost 210 aircraft in combat.

=== After World War II ===
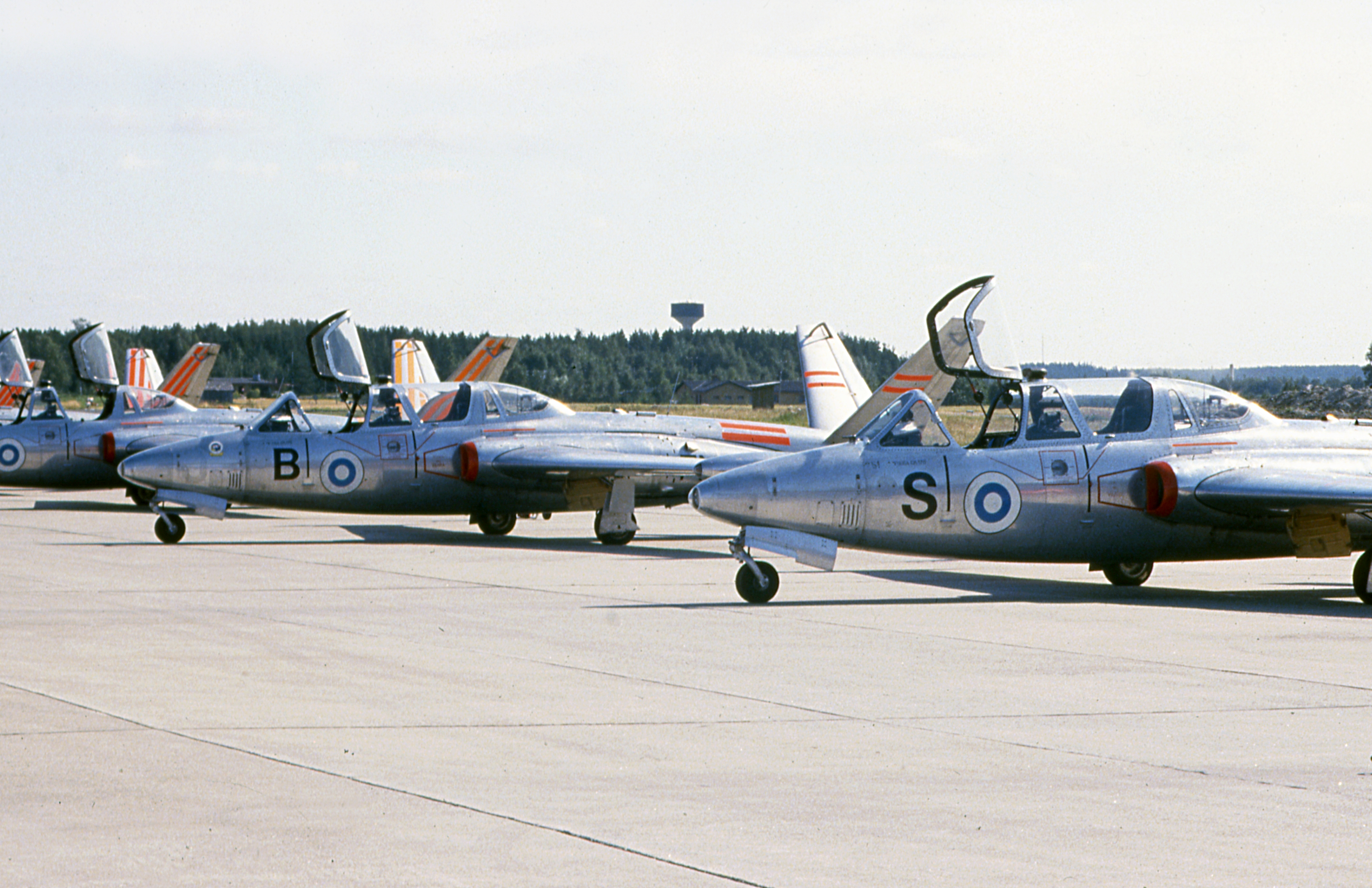
Fouga CM.170 Magister trainers in Finnish service, 1986

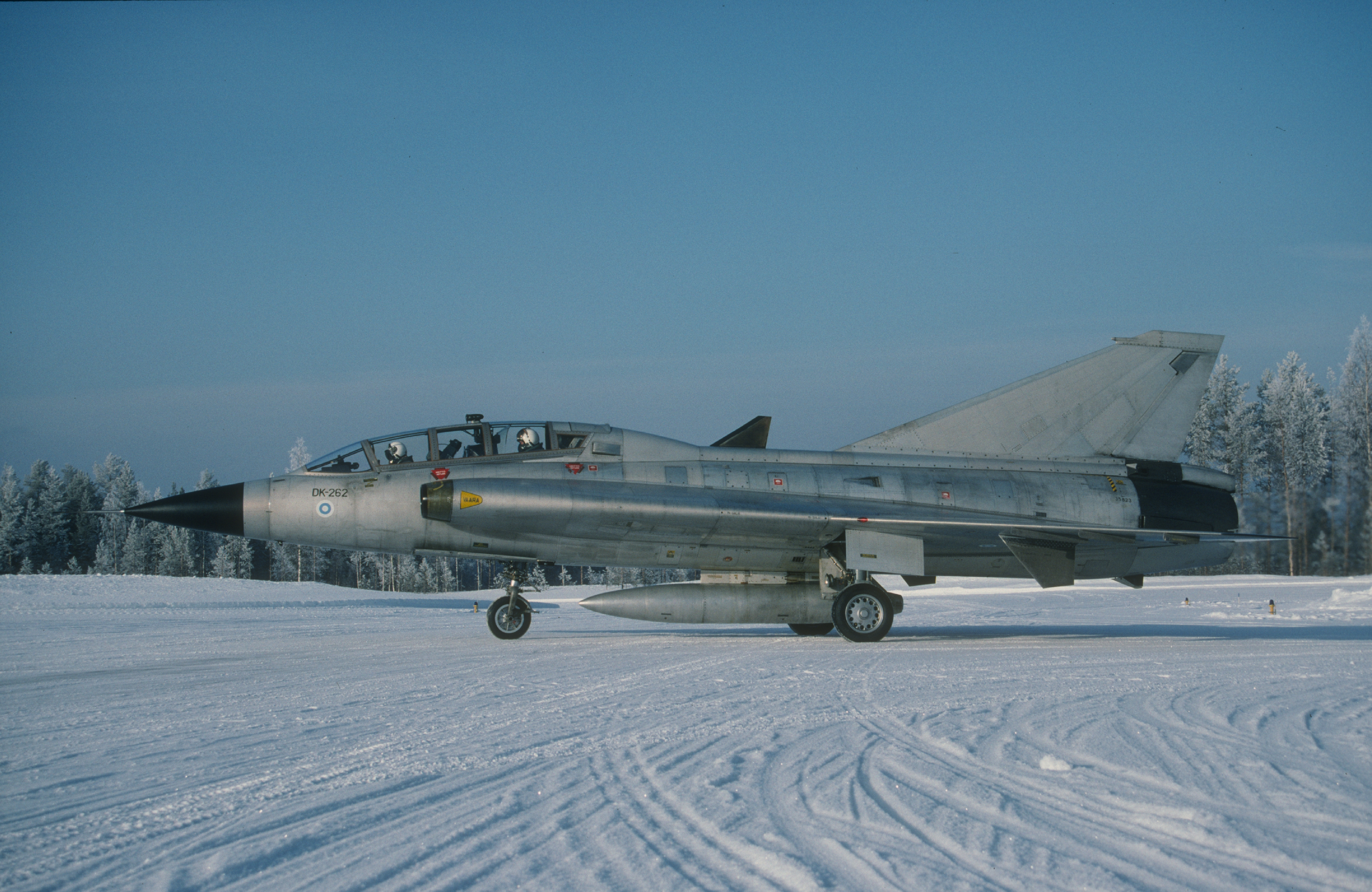
Saab 35 Draken fighter in Finnish service, 1994

Following the end of World War II, the Paris Peace Treaties of 1947 imposed significant restrictions on the Finnish Air Force. These limitations included:

- a maximum of 60 combat aircraft
- prohibition of aircraft with internal bomb bays
- prohibition of guided missiles and nuclear weapons
- prohibition of weapons of German origin or manufacture
- a personnel limit of 3,000

These restrictions reflected broader post-war limitations placed on Finland’s armed forces. During the Cold War, Finland adapted to these constraints while gradually modernising its air force. Some aircraft were acquired and designated as trainers, which allowed flexibility in their operational use.

During the Cold War (c. 1947–1991), Finland pursued a policy of balanced procurement, acquiring aircraft from Western, Eastern, and domestic sources. This resulted in a diverse fleet that included British, French, Swedish, Soviet, and Finnish aircraft. Sweden also maintained contingency plans to transfer Saab 35 Draken fighters to Finland in the event of a conflict. On 22 September 1990, Finland declared that the military restrictions of the Paris Peace Treaty were no longer applicable, following changes in the European security environment and the approaching reunification of Germany. In the 1990s, the Finnish Air Force underwent major modernisation. The Saab 35 Draken and Mikoyan-Gurevich MiG-21 fighters were retired and replaced by the F/A-18C/D Hornet, marking a transition to a fully Western fighter fleet.

=== After the Cold War ===
As of 2023, the Finnish Air Force is organised into three operational Air Wings located at Rovaniemi, Pirkkala (Tampere), and Kuopio-Rissala. Pilot training is conducted at the Air Force Academy in Tikkakoski. In 2023, the English-language designation of the operational units was standardised from "Air Command" to "Air Wing".

==== HX Fighter Program ====
The HX Fighter Program was launched in 2015 to replace the Finnish Air Force's ageing F/A-18C/D Hornet fleet. The programme aimed to procure 64 multi-role fighters to maintain Finland’s air defence capability.

On 10 December 2021, the Finnish government selected the F-35A Lightning II as the winner of the competition. The procurement includes 64 aircraft and associated weapons, support systems, and training, with a total cost of €9.998 billion.

Deliveries are scheduled between 2026 and 2030. The F-35 will replace the Hornet fleet during the late 2020s and is expected to remain in service into the 2060s.

==== Future capabilities ====
In July 2026, Finland announced several NATO-related aviation capability initiatives. The Finnish Ministry of Defence stated that Finland had joined a letter of intent concerning a crewed airborne early warning capability, intended to acquire a national capability aligned with NATO's planned Saab GlobalEye airborne warning and control system replacement. Saab stated that no contract or order had yet been signed for NATO's GlobalEye announcement.

Finland also joined the Multinational Multi-Role Tanker Transport Fleet, giving it access to flight hours on Airbus A330 MRTT aircraft for aerial refuelling, strategic airlift and medical evacuation. The Finnish Defence Forces described air-to-air refuelling as a new capability for Finland.

Denmark, Finland, Germany and Norway also announced the procurement of up to five Northrop Grumman MQ-4C Triton high-altitude, long-endurance uncrewed aircraft to enhance NATO's owned Intelligence, Surveillance and Reconnaissance Force.

== Equipment ==
=== Aircraft ===
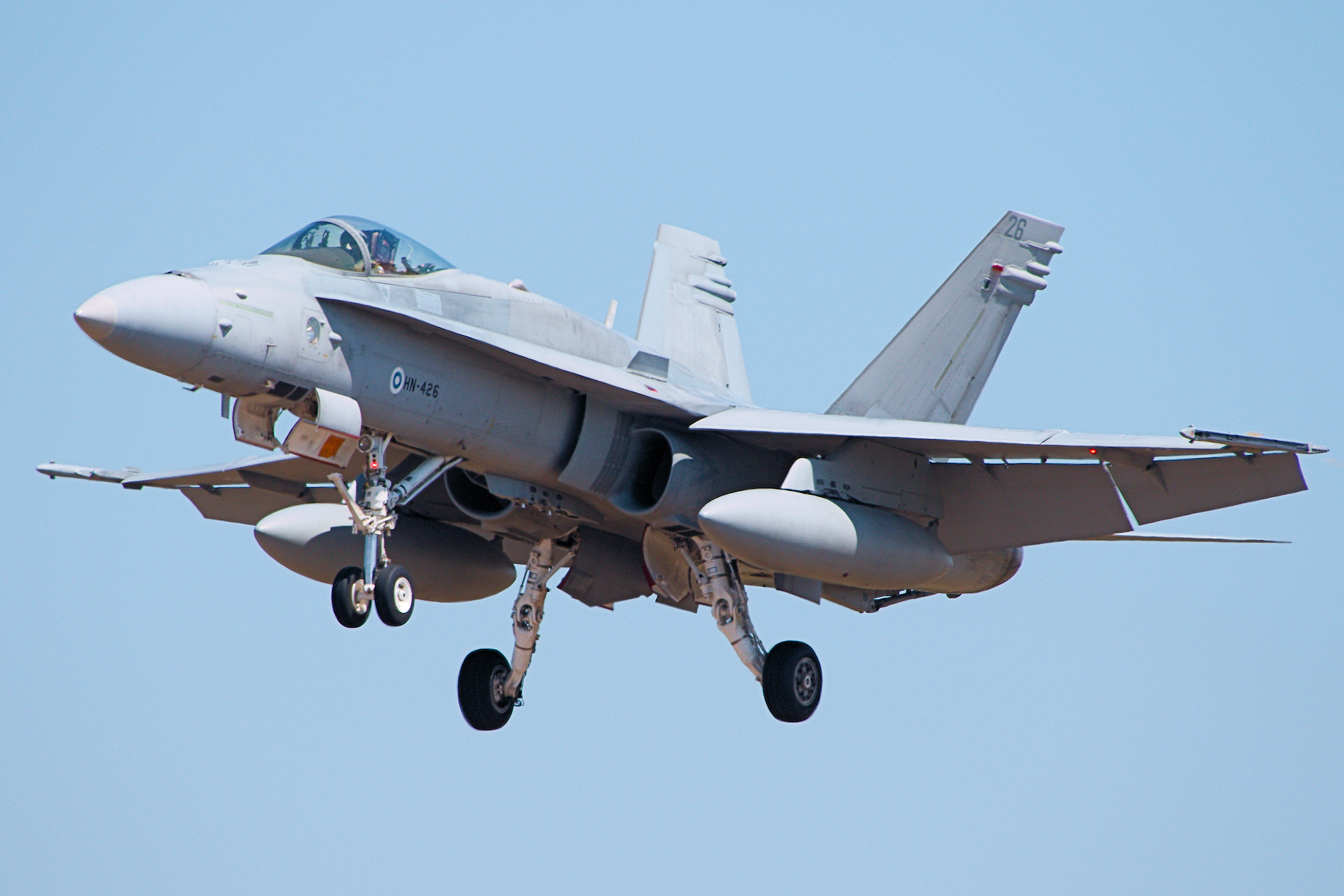
An F/A-18C of the Finnish Air Force

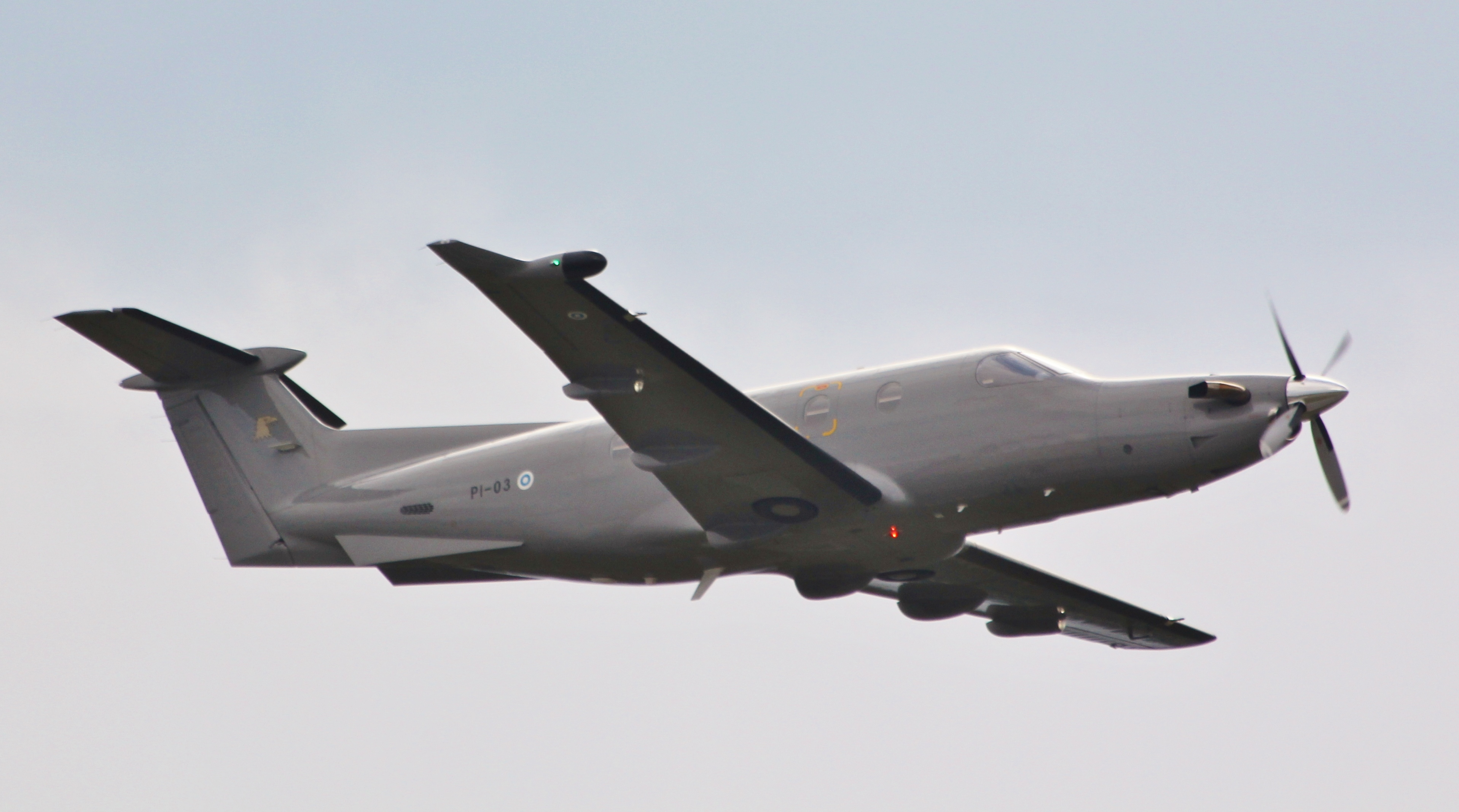
A Finnish PC-12NG in flight

| Aircraft | Origin | Type | Variant | In service | Notes |
Combat aircraft
| Boeing F/A-18 | United States | Multirole | F/A-18C MLU2 | 53 | |
| F-35 Lightning II | United States | Multirole | F-35A | 12 | 9 are located in the US for training of Finnish pilots. 52 on order |
Electronic warfare
| Airbus C295 | Spain | Electronic warfare | C-295M | 1 | |
Transport
| Airbus C295 | Spain | Transport | C-295M | 2 | |
| Learjet 35 | United States | Transport / liaison aircraft | – | 2 | To be replaced |
| Pilatus PC-12 | Switzerland | Liaison | PC-12NG | 6 | |
Trainer aircraft
| Boeing F/A-18 | United States | Conversion trainer | F/A-18D MLU2 | 7 | |
| BAE Hawk | United Kingdom | Advanced trainer | 51 / 51A / 66 | 35 | To be replaced |
| Grob G 115E | Germany | Basic trainer | | 28 | |

Finland participates in the multinational Strategic Airlift Capability (SAC) programme and has access to three Boeing C-17 Globemaster III transport aircraft operated by the Heavy Airlift Wing at Pápa Air Base in Hungary.

In May 2025, the Finnish Air Force announced its intention, within the framework of Nordic Defence Cooperation, to join the multinational Airbus A330 MRTT tanker programme and the European Air Transport Command (EATC), based at Eindhoven Air Base in the Netherlands.

=== Armament ===
| Model | Origin | Type | Variant | Quantity | Notes |
Aircraft cannon
| M61 Vulcan | United States | Rotary cannon (20×102mm) | – | 60 | Equips each of the F/A-18 C/D aircraft in service. |
| GAU-22/A | United States | Rotary cannon (25×137mm) | GAU-22/A | 12 (+ 52 on order) | Will equip all of the F-35A aircraft to enter service. The first aircraft was delivered. |
Air-to-air missile
| AIM-9 Sidewinder | United States | IR homing, short range air-to-air missile | AIM-9M | 370 | Purchased for the F/A-18 fleet. |
| AIM-9 Sidewinder | United States | IR homing, short range air-to-air missile | AIM-9X | 143 | Purchased with the MLU 1 of the F/A-18 fleet. |
| AIM-9 Sidewinder | United States | IR homing, short range air-to-air missile | AIM-9X Block II+ | 150 | Purchased with the fleet of F-35A, with 32 captive air training missiles. |
| AIM-120 AMRAAM | United States | Radar homing, BVR air-to-air missile | AIM-120B | 445 | Purchased with the fleet of F/A-18 in 1992. Note: also used with the NASAMS (ITO 12). |
| AIM-120 AMRAAM | United States | Radar homing, BVR air-to-air missile | AIM-120C-7 | 300 | Purchased with the MLU 1 of the F/A-18 fleet. Note: also used with the NASAMS (ITO 12). |
| AIM-120 AMRAAM | United States | Radar homing, BVR air-to-air missile | AIM-120D-3 | 0 (+ 405 on order) | Ordered in December 2025, for the F-35A. Note: only to be used with the F-35. |
Air-to-surface missile
| AGM-158 JASSM | United States | Air-launched cruise missile | AGM-158A JASSM | 70 | Ordered as part of the MLU 2 of the F/A-18 fleet. |
| AGM-158 JASSM | United States | Air-launched cruise missile | AGM-158B-2 JASSM-ER | 0 (+ 200 on order) | Purchased with the fleet of F-35A. |
| AGM-88 HARM | United States | Air-to-surface anti-radiation missile | AGM-88G AARGM-ER | 0 (+ 150 on order) | Ordered in 2024 to equip the fleet of F-35A. |
Glide bombs
| AGM-154 JSOW; Joint Standoff Weapon | United States | Precision guided glide bomb | AGM-154C | 15 | 15 ordered with the MLU 1 of the F/A-18 fleet. |
| AGM-154 JSOW; Joint Standoff Weapon | United States | Precision guided glide bomb | AGM-154C-1 | 100 | Purchased with the fleet of F-35A. |
| GBU-39/B Small Diameter Bomb | United States | Precision guided glide bomb 285 lb (129 kg) | SDB I | 0 (on order; quantity not disclosed) | Ordered for the F-35A fleet as part of the 2024 JDAM and GBU-39 SDB I procurement. GPS / INS guidance. |
| GBU-53/B StormBreaker | United States | Precision guided glide bomb 204 lb (93 kg) | SDB II | 0 (+ 500 on order) | Purchased with the fleet of F-35A. GPS/INS-aided weapon with a multi-mode terminal seeker. |
Precision-guided bombs
| GBU-31 JDAM; Joint Direct Attack Munition | United States | Precision guided munition 2,000 lb (910 kg) | GBU-31(V)1/B — Mk 84 / BLU-117 general-purpose bomb body with KMU-556 JDAM guidance kit | Part of 114 (+ 120 on order for F-35A) | Purchased for the F/A-18 MLU programme as part of the 114 GBU-31 JDAMs. Additional weapons were purchased with the fleet of F-35A. The Mk 84 / BLU-117 general-purpose warhead corresponds to the GBU-31(V)1 configuration. GPS / INS guidance. |
| GBU-31 JDAM; Joint Direct Attack Munition | United States | Precision guided munition 2,000 lb (910 kg) | GBU-31(V)3/B — BLU-109 penetrator bomb body with KMU-557 JDAM guidance kit | Part of 114 (+ 30 JDAM kits and + 32 BLU-109 bomb bodies on order for F-35A) | Purchased for the F/A-18 MLU programme as part of the 114 GBU-31 JDAMs. Additional weapons were purchased with the fleet of F-35A. The BLU-109 penetrator warhead corresponds to the GBU-31(V)3 configuration. GPS / INS guidance. |
| GBU-32 JDAM; Joint Direct Attack Munition | United States | Precision guided munition 1,000 lb (450 kg) | Mk 83 / BLU-110 general-purpose bomb body with JDAM guidance kit | ? | Used with the F/A-18 fleet. The Mk 83 warhead corresponds to the GBU-32 configuration. GPS / INS guidance. |
| GBU-38 JDAM; Joint Direct Attack Munition | United States | Precision guided munition 500 lb (230 kg) | Mk 82 / BLU-111 general-purpose bomb body with KMU-572 JDAM guidance kit | ? (+ 150 KMU-572 kits and + 150 BLU-111 bomb bodies listed for GBU-38/54) | Used with the F/A-18 fleet and ordered for the F-35A fleet. The Mk 82 / BLU-111 general-purpose warhead corresponds to the GBU-38 configuration. GPS / INS guidance. |
| GBU-54 JDAM Laser JDAM/LJDAM; Joint Direct Attack Munition | United States | Precision guided munition 500 lb (230 kg) | Mk 82 / BLU-111 bomb body with KMU-572 JDAM guidance kit and DSU-38 laser sensor | 0 (included in the GBU-38/54 package; split not disclosed) | Ordered for the F-35A fleet as part of the GBU-38/54 JDAM kit package, together with DSU-38 laser detector equipment. GPS / INS / SAL guidance. |

=== Air surveillance ===
| Model | Finnish designation | Origin | Type | Quantity | Notes |
Radars
| Thales GroundMaster 403 | KEVA 2010 | France | Long range, S-band (IEEE), 3D, AESA, mobile air surveillance radar | 12 | Transported by Sisu E13TP. |
| Thompson TRS 2215D | KAVA | France | Long range, E / F-band (IEEE), 3D, air surveillance radar | 6 | Fixed radar. |
| Saab Giraffe 100 AAA | LÄVA | Sweden | Medium range, C-band (IEEE), 3D, mobile air surveillance radar | 4 | Transported by Sisu SK 242. |

== Organization ==
Finnish Air Force bases
F-18C/D Hawk Support

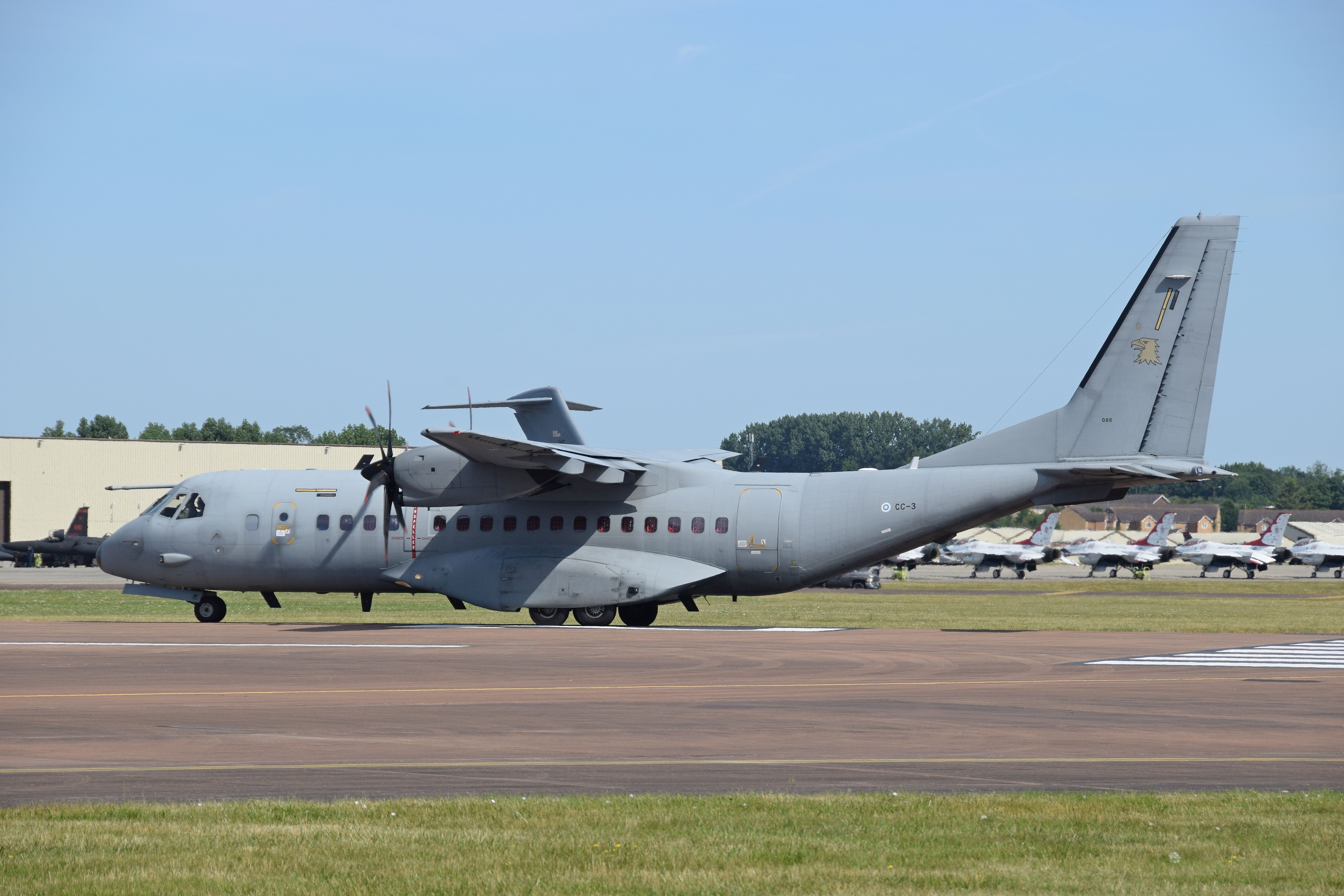
Airbus C-295M of the Finnish Air Force

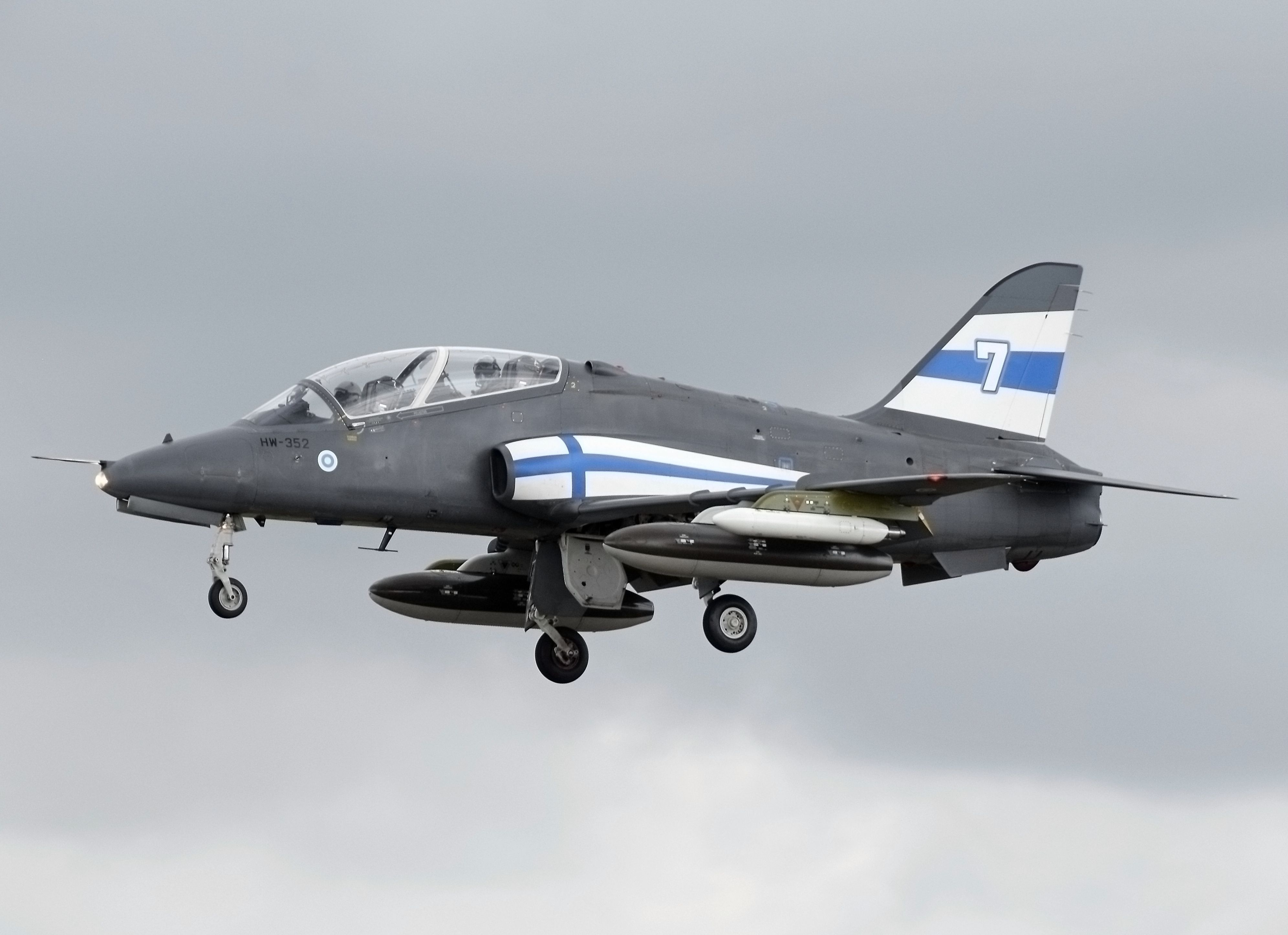
A BAE Hawk 51 of the Finnish Midnight Hawks

The Finnish Air Force is organised into the Air Force Command, three operational Air Wings, and the Air Force Academy.

- Air Force Command, at Tikkakoski Air Base
  - Air Operations Centre
- Lapland Air Wing, at Rovaniemi Air Base
  - Fighter Squadron 11
  - Aircraft Maintenance Squadron
  - Base and support units
- Karelia Air Wing, at Kuopio-Rissala Air Base
  - Fighter Squadron 31
  - Aircraft Maintenance Squadron
  - Base and support units
- Satakunta Air Wing, at Pirkkala Air Base
  - Transport and liaison squadrons operating Airbus C-295, Learjet 35, and Pilatus PC-12
  - Aircraft Maintenance Squadron
  - Base and support units
- Air Force Academy, at Tikkakoski Air Base
  - Squadron 41, operating BAE Hawk
  - Training and support units
  - Finnish Air Force Band

=== Wartime strength ===
In wartime, the Finnish Air Force expands through mobilisation of reservists and dispersal to a network of prepared operating bases. Prior to the introduction of the F-35A Lightning II, its wartime structure included:

- Two fighter squadrons equipped with F/A-18 Hornet
- One advanced jet training squadron equipped with BAE Hawk
- Transport and liaison units
- Multiple dispersed operating bases

The wartime strength of the Finnish Air Force is approximately 38,000 personnel.

== Commanders ==
| Rank | Name | Took office | Left office | Time in office |
|---|---|---|---|---|
| Captain | Carl Seber | 28 April 1918 | 13 December 1918 | |
| Lieutenant colonel | Torsten Aminoff | 14 December 1918 | 9 January 1919 | |
| Colonel | Sixtus Hjelmmann | 10 January 1919 | 25 October 1920 | |
| Major | Arne Somersalo | 26 October 1920 | 2 February 1926 | |
| Colonel | Väinö Vuori | 2 February 1926 | 7 September 1932 | |
| Lieutenant general | Jarl Lundqvist | 8 September 1932 | 29 June 1945 | |
| Lieutenant general | Frans Helminen | 30 June 1945 | 30 November 1952 | |
| Lieutenant general | Reino Artola | 1 December 1952 | 5 December 1958 | |
| Major general | Fjalar Seeve | 6 December 1958 | 12 September 1964 | |
| Lieutenant general | Reino Turkki | 13 September 1964 | 4 December 1968 | |
| Lieutenant general | Eero Salmela | 7 February 1969 | 21 April 1975 | |
| Lieutenant general | Rauno Meriö | 22 April 1975 | 31 January 1987 | |
| Lieutenant general | Pertti Jokinen | 1 February 1987 | 31 January 1991 | |
| Lieutenant general | Heikki Nikunen | 1 February 1991 | 30 April 1995 | |
| Major general | Matti Ahola | 1 May 1995 | 31 August 1998 | |
| Lieutenant general | Jouni Pystynen | 1 September 1998 | 31 December 2004 | |
| Lieutenant general | Heikki Lyytinen | 1 January 2005 | 31 July 2008 | |
| Lieutenant general | Jarmo Lindberg | 1 August 2008 | 29 February 2012 | |
| Major general | Lauri Puranen | 1 March 2012 | 31 March 2014 | |
| Major general | Kim Jäämeri | 1 April 2014 | 31 May 2017 | |
| Major general | Sampo Eskelinen | 1 June 2017 | 31 March 2019 | |
| Major general | Pasi Jokinen | 1 April 2019 | 31 May 2022 | |
| Major general | Juha-Pekka Keränen | 1 June 2022 | Incumbent | |

== See also ==
- List of military aircraft of Finland
- List of World War II aces from Finland
- List of air forces
