= Koivisto (surname) =

Koivisto is a Finnish surname. Notable people with the surname include:

- Anu Koivisto, Finnish backstroke swimmer
- Emma Koivisto, Finnish professional footballer
- Henrik Koivisto (born 1990), Finnish ice hockey player
- Mauno Koivisto (1923–2017), Finnish president
- Rami Koivisto (born 1968), Finnish ice hockey player
- Tellervo Koivisto (née Kankaanranta, born 1929), Finnish politician and the former First Lady of Finland
- Tellervo M. Koivisto (née Heino, 1927–1982), Finnish teacher and politician
- Tom Koivisto, Finnish ice hockey player
- Toni Koivisto, Finnish ice hockey player
- Markku Koivisto, Finnish revival evangelist, doctor of theology
