= Koivisto =

Koivisto may refer to:

== Surname ==
- Koivisto (surname)

== Places ==
- Beryozovye Islands (formerly named Koivisto)
- Primorsk, Leningrad Oblast (formerly named Koivisto)
