= John-Allan Hygerth =

Swedish soldier and air force commander

John-Allan Hygerth (25 July 1885 – 2 February 1954) was a Swedish soldier, and commander of the Finnish Air Force during the Finnish Civil War.

== Early life ==
Hygerth was born on 24 July 1885 in By parish in Värmland, Sweden. He served as a lieutenant in the Swedish Småland Artillery Regiment.

== Finnish Civil War ==
Soon after Finland's declaration of independence, the Finnish Civil War erupted, between the Whites and the Reds. The Russian Bolsheviks sided with the Finnish Red Guards, communists with a similar ideology. The Whites managed to seize a few aircraft and air bases from the Russians, but had to heavily rely on foreign pilots and aircraft. Sweden refused to send men and material officially, due to its neutrality in the conflict, but individual Swedish private citizens came forward to help the Whites. The editor of the Swedish daily magazine Aftonbladet, Waldemar Langlet, bought an N.A.B. Albatross aircraft from the Nordiska Aviatik A.B. factory with funds gathered by the Finlands Vänner (“Friends of Finland”) organization. This was the first aircraft to arrive from Sweden. It was flown via Haparanda on 25 February 1918 by Lt. Hygerth and Per Svanbäck. The aircraft made a stop at Kokkola and had to make a forced landing in Jakobstad when the engine broke down. This aircraft was later given the designation F.2(“F” came from the Swedish word “Flygmaskin” (aircraft)).

On 10 March 1918 Hygerth was appointed as commander of the Finnish Air Force. Hygerth, a foreigner, was appointed due to the fact that Finland had no pilots, few airplanes, and relied on Sweden, Germany, and others for help, although most of the aircraft ordered from other countries ended up contributing very little or not arriving before the end of hostilities. Hygerth was, however, replaced on 18 April 1918, due to his unsuitability for the position and numerous accidents. His job was taken over by the German Captain Carl Seber, who commanded the air force from 28 April 1918 until 13 December 1918.

== Death ==
Hygerth died on 2 February 1954.
