= Next Generation Missile =

Joint Dual Role Air Dominance Missile
- Type: Medium-range, air-to-air missile and anti-radiation missile
- Place of origin: USA

Specifications
- Guidance system: active radar homing

The Next Generation Missile (NGM), formerly the Joint Dual Role Air Dominance Missile (JDRADM), was a proposed Beyond-visual-range (BVR) air-to-air missile (AAM) capable of all-weather day and night performance, to replace the AIM-120 AMRAAM and AGM-88 HARM. It was proposed to be cancelled in the Obama Administration's 2013 budget request. A parallel project, the T-3 (Triple Target Terminator) program has continued. The T-3 missile is aimed at three major targets — enemy aircraft, cruise missiles and air defence networks.

== See also ==
- Meteor (missile)
- AIM-260 JATM
- List of missiles
- Missile designation
