= AIM-120 AMRAAM =

American medium-range air-to-air missile

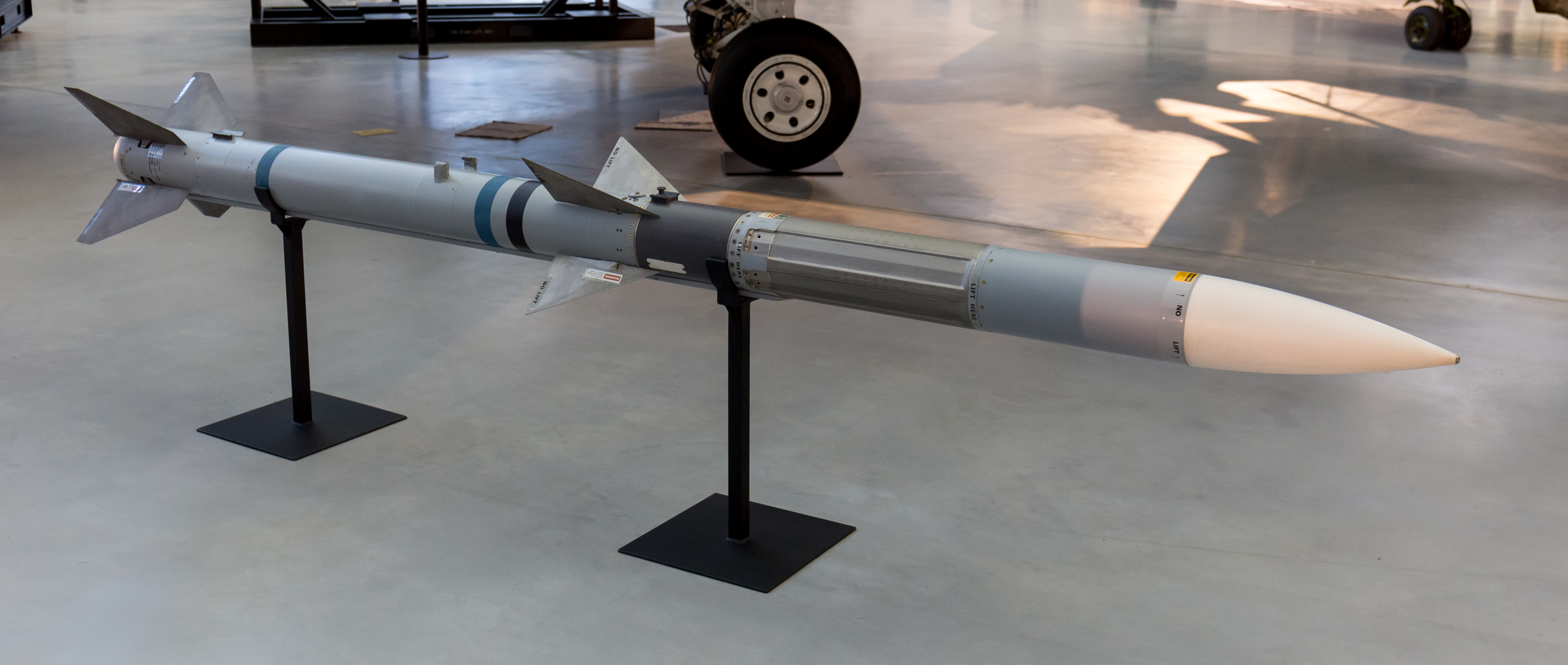
- On display at the Steven F. Udvar-Hazy Center
- Type: Medium range radar guided air-to-air missile/surface-to-air missile (AMRAAM-ER and SLAMRAAM)
- Place of origin: United States

Service history
- In service: September 1991–present
- Used by: See § Operators
- Wars: Gulf War; Bosnian War; Kosovo War; Syrian civil war; 2019 Jammu and Kashmir airstrikes; Russo-Ukrainian War; Russian invasion of Ukraine; Yemeni civil war (2014–present); Saudi-led intervention in the Yemeni civil war; 2025 Russian drone incursion into Poland

Production history
- Manufacturer: 1991–97 – Hughes; 1997–present – Raytheon
- Unit cost: US$1,095,000 (AIM-120D FY 2019)
- Variants: AIM-120A, AIM-120B, AIM-120C, AIM-120D, AMRAAM-ER

Specifications (AIM-120C-5/6/7)
- Mass: 356 lb (161.5 kg)
- Length: 12 ft (3.65 m)
- Diameter: 7 in (178 mm)
- Wingspan: 1 ft 7 in (484 mm)
- Warhead: High explosive blast-fragmentation
- Warhead weight: 44 lb (20 kg)
- Detonation mechanism: FZU-49 Proximity fuze, impact fuse system
- Engine: Solid-fuel rocket motor. AIM120A/B/C-1 through C-4, boost-sustainer configuration. AIM120C-5 and later/D, booster only.
- Propellant: Reduced smoke hydroxyl-terminated poly-butadiene (HTPB) binder
- Operational range: AIM-120A/B 40 nmi (75 km); AIM-120C 49 nmi (90 km); AIM-120D 70–86 nmi (130–160 km)
- Maximum speed: Mach 4 (4,501 ft/s; 1,372 m/s)
- Guidance system: Inertial guidance, terminal active radar homing, optional mid-course update datalink
- Steering system: AIM-120C-5/6/7 40G maximum overload via forward and rear canards
- References: Janes C-5 performance assessment ->

The AIM-120 (Note: "AIM" is not an acronym, rather the three letters designate an Air-Launched (A), Aerial-Intercept (I) Missile (M). Refer to 1963 United States Tri-Service rocket and guided missile designation system.) Advanced Medium-Range Air-to-Air Missile (AMRAAM) (/æmræm/ AM-ram) is an American beyond-visual-range air-to-air missile capable of all-weather day-and-night operations. It uses active transmit-receive radar guidance instead of semi-active receive-only radar guidance; as an active seeker missile, NATO pilots thus use the brevity code "Fox Three" when firing the AIM-120.

The AMRAAM largely replaced the AIM-7 Sparrow as the principal beyond-visual-range air-to-air missile in US inventory. As of 2008 more than 14,000 had been produced for the United States Air Force, the United States Navy, and 33 international customers. The AMRAAM has been used in several engagements, achieving 16 air-to-air kills in conflicts over Iraq, Bosnia, Kosovo, India, and Syria. In the long term, it is expected to eventually be replaced by the long range AIM-260 JATM in US service and the MBDA Meteor in some European countries.

== Origins ==
=== AIM-7 Sparrow MRM ===
The AIM-7 Sparrow medium range missile (MRM) was purchased by the US Navy from original developer Hughes Aircraft in the 1950s as its first operational air-to-air missile with "beyond visual range" (BVR) capability. With an effective range of about 12 miles (19 km), it was introduced as a radar beam-riding missile and then it was improved to a semi-active radar guided missile which would home in on reflections from a target illuminated by the radar of the launching aircraft. It was effective at visual to beyond visual range. The early beam riding versions of the Sparrow missiles were integrated onto the McDonnell F3H Demon and Vought F7U Cutlass, but the definitive AIM-7 Sparrow was the primary weapon for the all-weather McDonnell Douglas F-4 Phantom II fighter/interceptor, which lacked an internal gun in its US Navy, US Marine Corps, and early US Air Force versions. The F-4 carried up to four AIM-7s in built-in recesses under its belly.

Designed for use against non-maneuvering targets such as bombers, the missiles initially performed poorly against fighters over North Vietnam, and were progressively improved until they proved highly effective in dogfights. Together with the short-range, infrared-guided AIM-9 Sidewinder, they replaced the AIM-4 Falcon IR and radar guided series for use in air combat by the USAF as well. A disadvantage to semi-active homing was that only one target could be illuminated by the launching fighter plane at a time. Also, the launching aircraft had to remain pointed in the direction of the target (within the azimuth and elevation of its own radar set) which could be difficult or dangerous in air-to-air combat.

An active-radar variant called the Sparrow II was developed to address these drawbacks, but the US Navy pulled out of the project in 1956. The Royal Canadian Air Force, which took over development in the hopes of using the missile to arm their prospective Avro Canada CF-105 Arrow interceptor, soon followed in 1958. The electronics of the time simply could not be miniaturized enough to make Sparrow II a viable working weapon. It would take decades, and a new generation of digital electronics, to produce an effective active-radar air-to-air missile as compact as the Sparrow.

=== AIM-54 Phoenix LRM ===
The US Navy later developed the AIM-54 Phoenix long-range missile (LRM) for the fleet air defense mission. It was a large 1,000 lb (500 kg), Mach 5 missile designed to counter cruise missiles and the bombers that launched them. Originally intended for the straight-wing Douglas F6D Missileer and then the navalized General Dynamics–Grumman F-111B, it finally saw service with the Grumman F-14 Tomcat, the only fighter capable of carrying such a heavy missile. The Phoenix was the first US fire-and-forget, multiple-launch, radar-guided missile: one which used its own active guidance system to guide itself without help from the launch aircraft when it closed on its target. This, in theory, gave a Tomcat with a six-Phoenix load the unprecedented capability of tracking and destroying up to six targets beyond visual range, as far as 100 miles (160 km) away—the only US fighter with such capability.

A full load of six Phoenix missiles and their 330 lb (150 kg) dedicated launchers exceeded a typical Vietnam-era bomb load. Its service in the US Navy was primarily as a deterrent, as its use was hampered by restrictive rules of engagement in conflicts such as 1991 Gulf War, Southern Watch (enforcing the southern no-fly zone), and Iraq War. The US Navy retired the Phoenix in 2004 in light of availability of the AIM-120 AMRAAM on the McDonnell Douglas F/A-18 Hornet and the pending retirement of the F-14 Tomcat from active service in late 2006.

=== ACEVAL/AIMVAL ===
The Department of Defense conducted an extensive evaluation of air combat tactics and missile technology from 1974 to 1978 at Nellis AFB using the F-14 Tomcat and F-15 Eagle equipped with Sparrow and Sidewinder missiles as the blue force and aggressor F-5E aircraft equipped with AIM-9L all-aspect Sidewinders as the red force. This joint test and evaluation (JT&E) was designated Air Combat Evaluation/Air Intercept Missile Evaluation (ACEVAL/AIMVAL). A principal finding was that the necessity to produce illumination for the Sparrow until impact resulted in the red force's being able to launch their all-aspect Sidewinders before impact, resulting in mutual kills. What was needed was Phoenix-type multiple-launch and terminal active capability in a Sparrow-size airframe. This led to a memorandum of agreement (MOA) with European allies (principally the UK and Germany for development) for the US to develop an advanced, medium-range, air-to-air missile with the USAF as lead service.

==== ASRAAM ====
The MOA also saw an agreement to develop a replacement for the Sidewinder, specifically; an advanced 'dogfight' air-to-air missile, capable of better covering the range disparity that would emerge between such short-range missiles and the eventual AMRAAM. This task fell to a British-German design team, with the Germans leaving the project in 1989. The missile would emerge as the British Advanced Short Range Air-to-Air Missile (ASRAAM), entering service in 1998. While the US never adopted the ASRAAM—instead opting to continue upgrading the Sidewinder—the ASRAAM did enter into service with the British, Indian, and Australian militaries. The UK has continued to upgrade the ASRAAM, with the 'Block 6' variant entering service in 2022.

=== Requirements ===
By the 1990s, the reliability of the Sparrow had improved significantly, relative to its use in Vietnam, with it accounting for the largest number of aerial targets destroyed in the Desert Storm phase of the Gulf War. However, while the USAF had passed on the Phoenix and its own similar AIM-47 Falcon/Lockheed YF-12 to optimize dogfight performance, it still needed a multiple-launch fire-and-forget capability for the F-15 and F-16. The AMRAAM would need to be fitted on fighters as small as the F-16, and fit in the same spaces that were designed to fit the Sparrow on the F-4 Phantom. The European partners needed AMRAAM to be integrated on aircraft as small as the BAe Sea Harrier. The US Navy needed the AMRAAM to be carried on the F/A-18 Hornet and wanted capability for two to be carried on a launcher that normally carried one Sparrow to allow for more air-to-ground weapons. Finally, the AMRAAM became one of the primary air-to-air weapons of the new Lockheed Martin F-22 Raptor fighter, which needed to place all of its weapons into internal weapons bays in order to help achieve an extremely low radar cross-section.

== Development ==
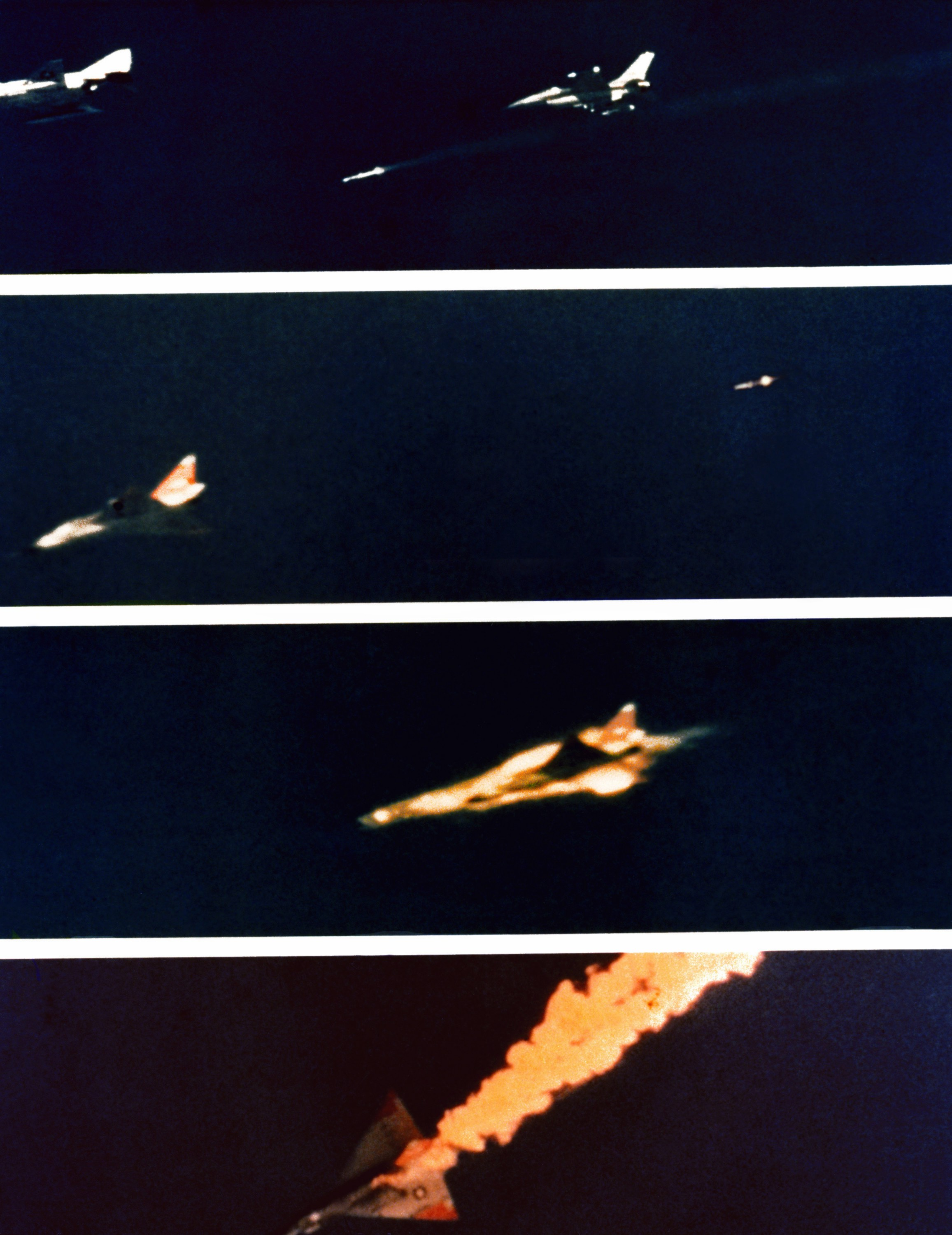
First successful test at the White Sands Missile Range, New Mexico 1982

AMRAAM was developed as the result of an agreement (the Family of Weapons MOA, no longer in effect by 1990), among the United States and several other NATO nations to develop air-to-air missiles and to share production technology. Under this agreement, the US was to develop the next generation medium range missile (AMRAAM) and Europe would develop the next generation short range missile (ASRAAM). Although Europe initially adopted the AMRAAM, an effort to develop the MDBA Meteor, a competitor to AMRAAM, was begun in UK. Eventually, the ASRAAM was developed solely by the British, but using another source for its infrared seeker. After protracted development, the deployment of AMRAAM (AIM-120A) began in September 1991 in US Air Force McDonnell Douglas F-15 Eagle fighter squadrons. The US Navy soon followed (in 1993) in its McDonnell Douglas F/A-18 Hornet squadrons.

The Russian Air Force counterpart of AMRAAM is the somewhat similar R-77 (NATO codename AA-12 Adder), sometimes referred to in the West as the "AMRAAMski". Likewise, France began its own air-to-air missile development with the MICA concept that used a common airframe for separate radar-guided and infrared-guided versions.

== Operational history ==
=== United States ===
The AMRAAM was used operationally for the first time on December 27, 1992, when a USAF General Dynamics F-16D Fighting Falcon shot down an Iraqi MiG-25 that violated the southern no-fly-zone. This missile had been returned from the flight line as defective a day earlier. The AMRAAM gained a second victory in January 1993 when an Iraqi MiG-23 was shot down by a USAF F-16C.

On 28 February 1994, a Serbian Republic Air Force J-21 Jastreb aircraft was shot down by a USAF F-16C that was patrolling the UN-imposed no-fly zone over Bosnia. In that engagement, at least three other Serbian aircraft were shot down by USAF F-16Cs using AIM-9 missiles (Banja Luka incident). At that point, three launches in combat had resulted in three kills, resulting in the AMRAAMs being informally named "slammer" in the second half of the 1990s.

In 1994, two USAF F-15 fighters patrolling Iraq's Northern No-Fly Zone mistook a pair of US Army Black Hawk helicopters for Iraqi helicopters, and shot them down. One was downed with an AIM-120, and one with an AIM-9 Sidewinder.

In 1998 and 1999 AMRAAMs were again fired by USAF F-15 fighters at Iraqi aircraft violating the No-Fly-Zones, but this time they failed to hit their targets. During spring 1999, AMRAAMs saw their main combat action during Operation Allied Force, the Kosovo bombing campaign. Six Serbian MiG-29s were shot down by NATO (four USAF F-15Cs, one USAF F-16C, and one Dutch F-16A MLU), all of them using AIM-120 missiles (the supposed kill by the F-16C may have actually been friendly fire, a man-portable SA-7 fired by Serbian infantry).

On 18 June 2017, a US Boeing F/A-18E Super Hornet engaged and shot down a Sukhoi Su-22 of the Syrian Air Force over northern Syria, using an AIM-120. An AIM-9X Sidewinder had failed to bring down the Syrian jet. Some sources have claimed the AIM-9X was decoyed by flares, although the F/A-18E pilot, Lieutenant Commander Michael "MOB" Tremel stated it was unclear why the AIM-9X failed, mentioning no use of flares by the Su-22, saying "I [lost] the smoke trail, and I have no idea what happened to the missile at that point".

=== Turkey ===
On 23 March 2014 a Turkish Air Force F-16 from 182 Squadron shot down a Syrian Arab Air Force MiG-23BN with an AIM-120C-7.

On 24 November 2015 a Turkish Air Force F-16 shot down a Russian Su-24M strike aircraft with an AIM-120 missile over northern Syria after it allegedly crossed into Turkish airspace.

On 1 March 2020, Turkish Air Force F-16s downed two Su-24s belonging to the Syrian Air Force using two AIM-120C-7s.

On 3 March 2020, a Syrian Air Force L-39 was shot down over Idlib by Turkish Air Force F-16s from inside Turkish airspace with AIM-120C-7 at a distance of about 45 km (28 mi). As of 2020, this has been the longest range AIM-120 kill.

=== Pakistan ===
On 27 February 2019, Pakistan Air Force (PAF) used AMRAAMs to shoot down an Indian MiG-21 during the 2019 Jammu and Kashmir airstrikes. Indian officials displayed fragments of an alleged AIM-120C-5 missile as a proof of its usage during the engagement.

=== Saudi Arabia ===
During the Yemeni War, Saudi Arabia extensively used F-15 and Typhoon aircraft together with Patriot batteries to intercept and down Yemeni drones and missiles. In November 2021, a possible Foreign Military Sales contract was notified to the US Congress regarding the provision to Saudi Arabia for a mix of 280 AIM-120C-7 and C-8 missiles and related support equipment and service that would be used on Saudi F-15 and Typhoon aircraft. The deal was required to replenish Saudi missiles stock, running low due to extensive use of AMRAAMs and Patriots against Yemeni missiles and drones.

=== Spain ===
On 7 August 2018, a Spanish Air Force Eurofighter Typhoon accidentally launched a missile in Estonia. There were no human casualties, but a ten-day search operation for the missile was unsuccessful.

=== Poland ===
In September 2025, an AIM-120 AMRAAM missile fired at a Shahed-type drone by a Polish F-16 fighter went astray and struck a residential building destroying the roof in Wyryki-Wola (Włodawa County, Lublin Voivodeship, in eastern Poland), during the Russian drone incursion into Poland.

== Effectiveness ==
The kill probability (P_{k}) is determined by several factors, including aspect (head-on interception, side-on or tail-chase), altitude, the speed of the missile and the target, and how hard the target can turn. Typically, if the missile has sufficient energy during the terminal phase, which comes from being launched at close range to the target from an aircraft with an altitude and speed advantage, it will have a good chance of success. This chance drops as the missile is fired at longer ranges as it runs out of overtake speed at long ranges, and if the target can force the missile to turn it might bleed off enough speed that it can no longer chase the target. Operationally, the missile, which was designed for beyond visual range combat, has a P_{k} of 0.59. The targets included six MiG-29s, a MiG-25, a MiG-23, two Su-22s, a Galeb, and a US Army Black Hawk that was targeted by mistake.

== Operational features summary ==
AMRAAM has an all-weather, beyond-visual-range (BVR) capability. It improves the aerial combat capabilities of US and allied aircraft to meet the threat of enemy air-to-air weapons as they existed in 1991. AMRAAM serves as a follow-on to the AIM-7 Sparrow missile series. The new missile is faster, smaller, and lighter, and has improved capabilities against low-altitude targets. It also incorporates a datalink to guide the missile to a point where its active radar turns on and makes terminal intercept of the target. An inertial reference unit and micro-computer system makes the missile less dependent upon the fire-control system of the aircraft.

Once the missile closes in on the target, its active radar guides it to intercept. This feature, known as "fire-and-forget", frees the aircrew from the need to further provide guidance, enabling the aircrew to aim and fire several missiles simultaneously at multiple targets and break a radar lock after the missile seeker goes active and guides itself to the targets.

The missile also features the ability to "Home on Jamming," giving it the ability to switch over from active radar homing to passive homing—homing on jamming signals from the target aircraft. Software on board the missile allows it to detect if it is being jammed, and guide on its target using the proper guidance system.

== Guidance system overview ==
=== Interception course stage ===
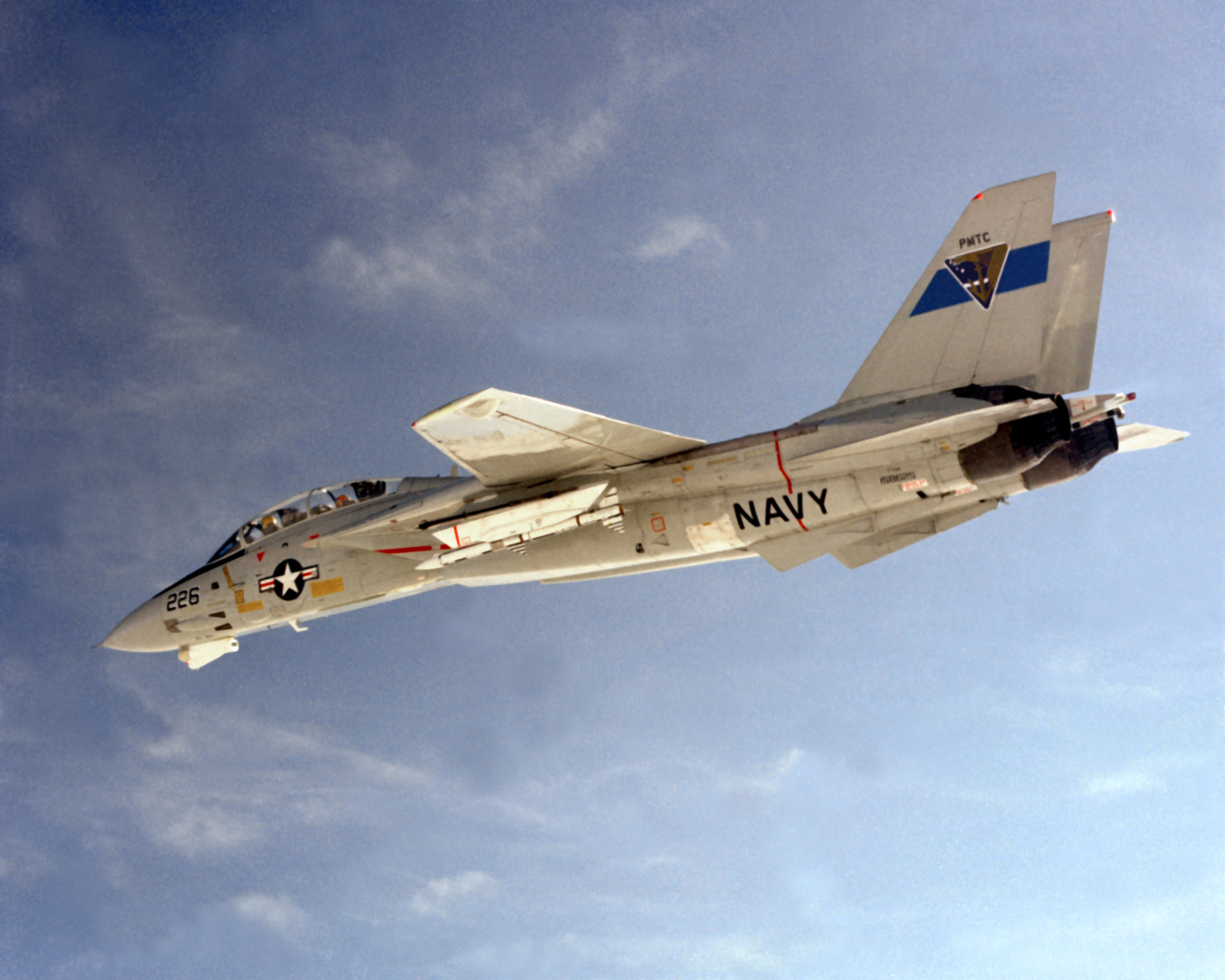
Grumman F-14 Tomcat carrying an AMRAAM during a 1982 test

AMRAAM uses two-stage guidance when fired at long range.

The aircraft passes data to the missile just before launch, giving it information about the location of the target aircraft from the launch point, including its direction and speed. This information is generally obtained using the launching aircraft's radar, although it could come from an infrared search and track system, from another fighter aircraft via a data link, or from an AWACS aircraft. Using its built-in inertial navigation system (INS), the missile uses the information provided pre-launch to fly on an interception course toward the target.

After launch, if the firing aircraft or surrogate continues to track the target, periodic updates, e.g. changes in the target's direction and speed, are sent from the launch aircraft to the missile, allowing the missile to adjust its course, via actuation of the rear fins, so that it is able to close to a self-homing distance where it will be close enough to "catch" the target aircraft in the basket (the missile's radar field of view in which it will be able to lock onto the target aircraft, unassisted by the launch aircraft).

Not all armed services using the AMRAAM have elected to purchase the mid-course update option, which limits AMRAAM's effectiveness in some scenarios. The RAF initially opted not to use mid-course update for its Tornado F3 force, only to discover that without it, testing proved the AMRAAM was less effective in beyond visual range (BVR) engagements than the older semi-active radar homing BAE Skyflash (a development of the Sparrow), since the AIM-120's own radar is necessarily of lesser range and power as compared to that of the launch aircraft.

=== Terminal stage and impact ===
Once the missile closes to self-homing distance, it turns on its active radar seeker and searches for the target aircraft. If the target is in or near the expected location, the missile will find it and guide itself to the target from this point. If the missile is fired at short range, within visual range (WVR) or the near BVR, it can use its active seeker just after launch to guide it to intercept.

=== Boresight Visual mode ===
Apart from the radar-slaved mode, there is a free guidance mode, called "Visual". This mode is host-aircraft radar guidance-free—the missile just fires and locks onto the first thing it sees. This mode can be used for defensive shots, i.e. when the enemy has numerical superiority.

== Variants and upgrades ==
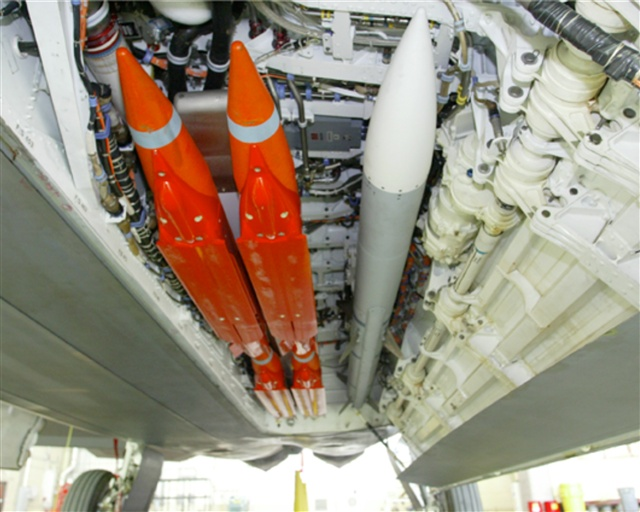
AIM-120 AMRAAM (right) fitted in a weapons bay of a F-22 Raptor

=== Air-to-air missile versions ===
There are currently four main variants of AMRAAM, all in service with the United States Air Force, United States Navy, and the United States Marine Corps.

=== AIM-120A ===
AIM-120A is no longer in production and shares the enlarged wings and fins with the successor, the AIM-120B.

=== AIM-120B ===
AIM-120B deliveries began in 1994. This variant had improved electronics, including a digital processor, upgraded memory, and electronic unit hardware chassis upgrades.

=== AIM-120C ===
AIM-120C deliveries began in 1996. The C-variant has been steadily upgraded since it was introduced. The AIM-120C has smaller "clipped" aerosurfaces to enable increased internal carriage on the USAF F-22 Raptor from four to six AMRAAMs. The AIM-120C-5 and above have an improved HOBs (High Off Bore-Sight) capability which improves its G overload and seekers field of view over the previous variants. This allows the missile to be more maneuverable and be used against targets that are offset from the launching aircraft frontal view which allows for greater flexibility during air-to-air combat. The AIM-120C-6 contained an improved fuze (Target Detection Device) compared to its predecessor. The AIM-120C-7 development began in 1998 and included improvements in homing and greater range (actual amount of improvement unspecified). According to Air Combat Command Public Affairs, starting with the AIM-120C-7, the AIM-120 series received an enhanced motor with an additional 5 inches of propellant (referred to as the +5 rocket motor). It is unspecified for how long this extends the burn time of the motor. It was successfully tested in 2003 and is currently being produced for both domestic and foreign customers. It helped the US Navy replace the F-14 Tomcats with F/A-18E/F Super Hornets—the loss of the F-14's long-range AIM-54 Phoenix missiles (already retired) is offset with a longer-range AMRAAM-D. The lighter weight of the enhanced AMRAAM enables an F/A-18E/F pilot greater bring-back weight upon carrier landings.

=== FMRAAM ===
The FMRAAM (Future Medium Range Air to Air Missile) was a modified ramjet powered version of the AMRAAM that was conceived during the mid-1990s to fulfill British requirements for a new longer range missile on their new Eurofighter Typhoon fighter. The FMRAAM was to use the Aérospatiale liquid fueled RASCAL (Ramjet for Small Calibre) propulsion system. It competed with and lost to the MBDA Meteor, thus never reaching production.

Work on a ramjet motor for the AMRAAM continued under the Variable Flow Ducted Rocket - Flight Vehicle Concept (VFDR-FVC) program in the 2000s, with a prototype demonstrator tested by Aerojet by 2008.

=== AIM-120D ===
AIM-120D is an upgraded version of the AMRAAM with improvements in almost all areas, including 50% greater range (than the already-extended range AIM-120C-7) and better guidance over its entire flight envelope yielding an improved kill probability (P_{k}). Initial production began in 2006 under the Engineering and Manufacturing Development phase of program testing and ceased in September 2009. Raytheon began testing the D model on August 5, 2008, the company reported that an AIM-120D launched from an F/A-18F Super Hornet passed within lethal distance of a QF-4 target drone at the White Sands Missile Range. The range of the AIM-120D is classified, but is thought to extend to about 100 miles (160 km) or potentially up to 112 miles (180 km). The AIM120D after F3R (Form, Fit, Function, Refresh) has a slightly bigger motor section. A more efficient battery and coding gives the AIM-120D increased range according to Raytheon Vice President Jon Norman.

The AIM-120D (P3I Phase 4) is a development of the AIM-120C with a two-way data link, more accurate navigation using a GPS-enhanced IMU, an expanded no-escape envelope, and a max speed of Mach 4. The AIM-120D is a joint USAF/USN project for which Follow-on Operational Test and Evaluation (FOT&E) was completed in 2014. The USN was scheduled to field it from 2014, and AIM-120D will be carried by all Pacific carrier groups by 2020, although the 2013 sequestration cuts could push back this later date to 2022. The Royal Australian Air Force requested 450 AIM-120D missiles, which would make it the first foreign operator of the missile. The procurement, approved by the US Government in April 2016, will cost $1.1 billion and will be integrated for use on the F/A-18F Super Hornet, EA-18G Growler and the F-35 Lightning II aircraft.

There were also plans for Raytheon to develop a ramjet-powered derivative of the AMRAAM, the Future Medium Range Air-Air Missile (FMRAAM). The FMRAAM was not produced since the target market, the British Ministry of Defence, chose the Meteor missile over the FMRAAM for a BVR missile for the Eurofighter Typhoon aircraft.

Raytheon is also working with the Missile Defense Agency to develop the Network Centric Airborne Defense Element (NCADE), an anti-ballistic missile derived from the AIM-120. This weapon will be equipped with a ramjet engine and an infrared homing seeker derived from the Sidewinder missile. In place of a proximity-fuzed warhead, the NCADE will use a kinetic energy hit-to-kill vehicle based on the one used in the Navy's RIM-161 Standard Missile 3.

The -120A and -120B models are nearing the end of their service life since the 2010s, while the -120D variant achieved initial operational capability in 2015. AMRAAM was due to be replaced by the USAF, the US Navy, and the US Marine Corps after 2020 by the Joint Dual Role Air Dominance Missile (Next Generation Missile), but it was terminated in the 2013 budget plan. Exploratory work was started in 2017 on a replacement called Long-Range Engagement Weapon.

In 2017, work on the AIM-260 Joint Advanced Tactical Missile (JATM) began to create a longer-ranged replacement for the AMRAAM to contend with foreign weapons like the Chinese PL-15. Flight tests are planned to begin in 2021 and initial operational capability is slated for 2022, facilitating the end of AMRAAM production by 2026. In July 2022, Raytheon announced the AIM-120D-3 became the longest-range variant in testing, as well as an air-launched adaptation of the NASAMS-based AMRAAM-ER called the AMRAAM-AXE (air-launched extended envelope). The development of AIM-120D-3 and AMRAAM-AXE is likely driven by the PL-15 performance. The AIM-120D-3 and the AIM-120C-8 variant for international customers were developed under the Form, Fit, Function Refresh (F3R) program and feature 15 upgraded circuit cards in the missile guidance section and the capability to continuously upgrade future software enhancements. All AMRAAMs planned for production are either the AIM-120D-3 or the AIM-120C-8 incorporating F3R functionality as of April 2023.

=== Ground-launched systems ===
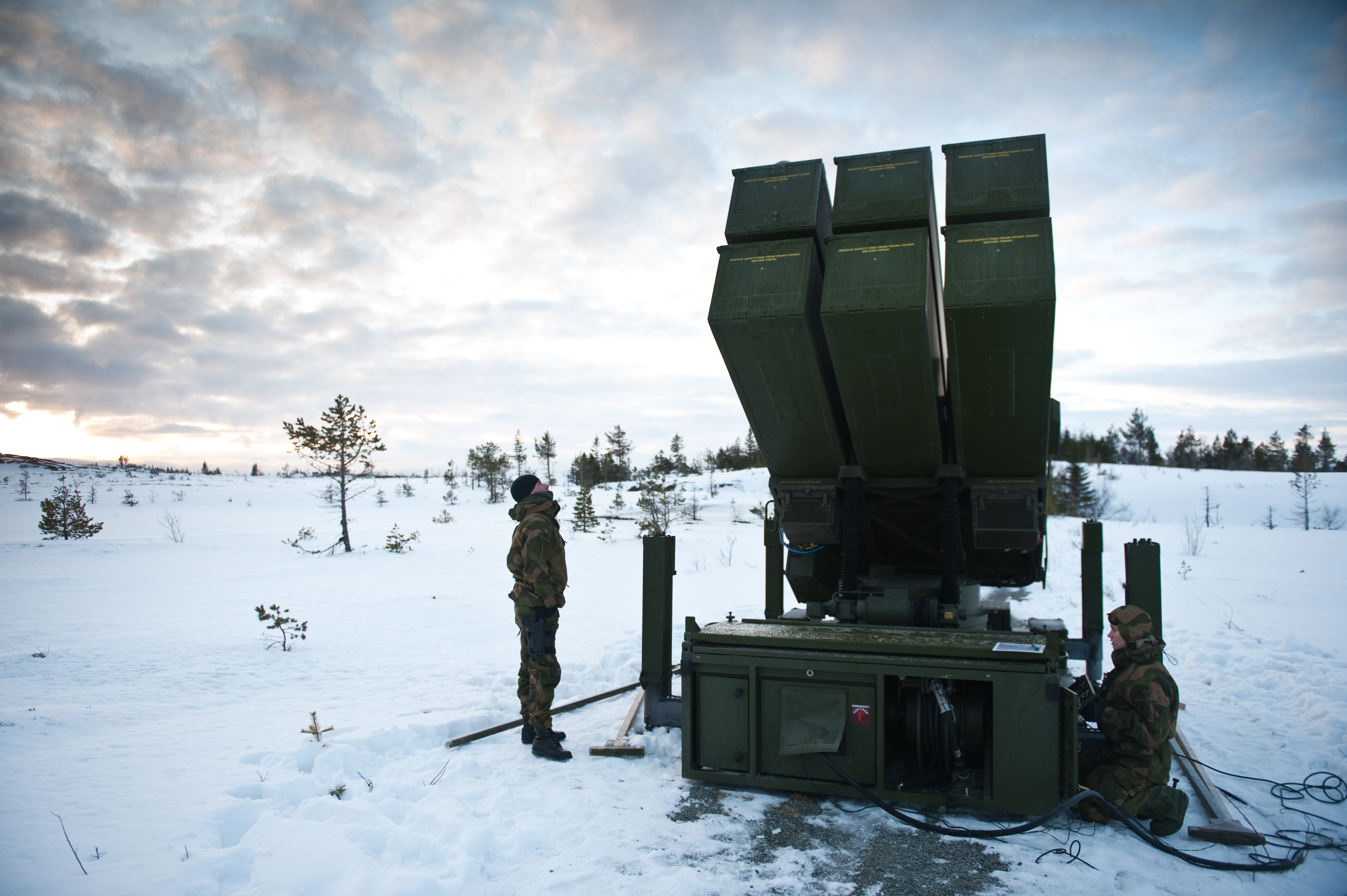
NASAMS launcher

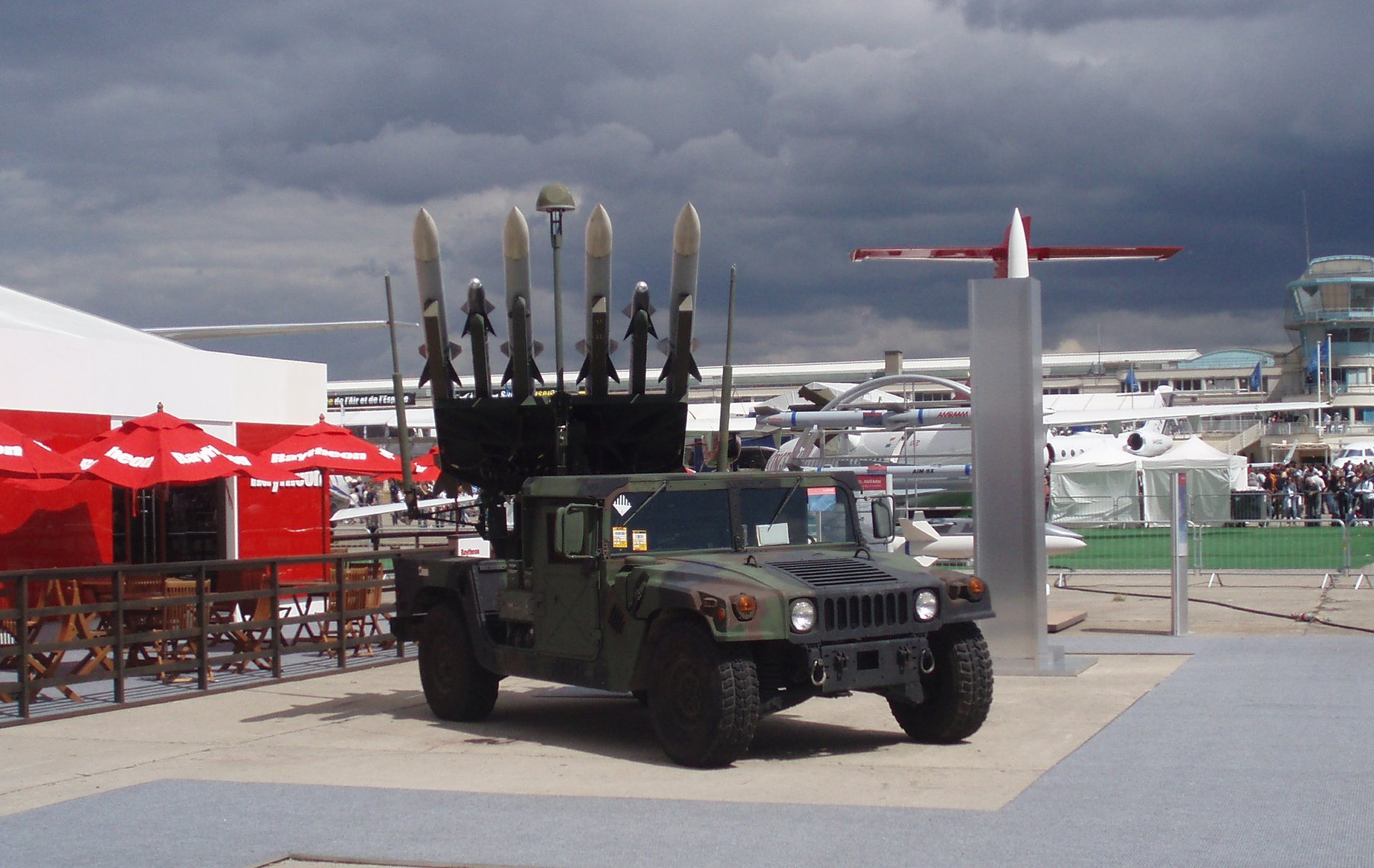
Battery of four AMRAAM and two AIM-9X on HMMWV

The Norwegian Advanced Surface-to-Air Missile System (NASAMS), developed by Kongsberg Defence & Aerospace and fielded in 1994–1995, consists of a number of towed batteries (containing six AMRAAM launching canisters with integrated launching rails) along with separate radar trucks and control station vehicles.

The US Marine Corps and the US Army tested launching AMRAAM missiles from a six-rail carrier on HMMWV as part of their CLAWS (Complementary Low-Altitude Weapon System) and SLAMRAAM (Surface Launched AMRAAM) programs, which were canceled due to budgetary cuts. A more recent version is the High Mobility Launcher for the NASAMS, made in cooperation with Raytheon (Kongsberg Defence & Aerospace was already a subcontractor on the SLAMRAAM system), where the launch-vehicle is a Humvee (M1152A1 HMMWV), containing four AMRAAMs and two optional AIM-9X Sidewinder missiles.

==== AMRAAM-ER ====
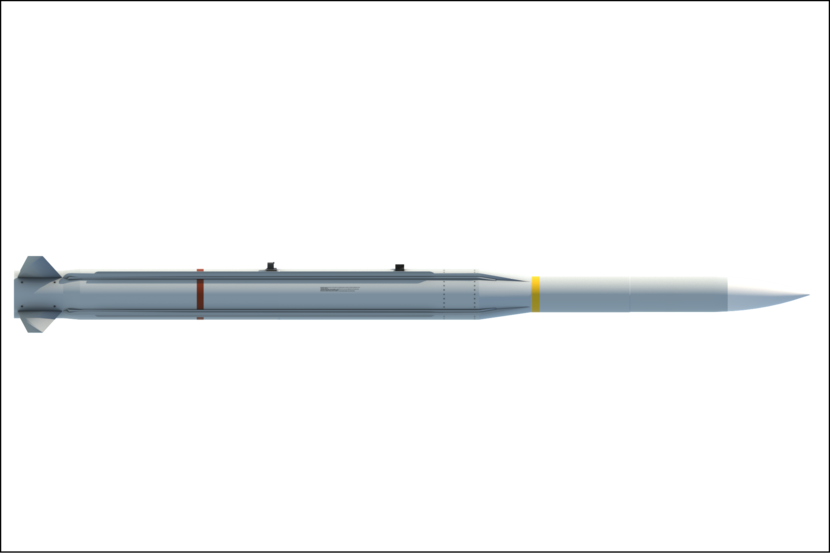
AMRAAM-ER

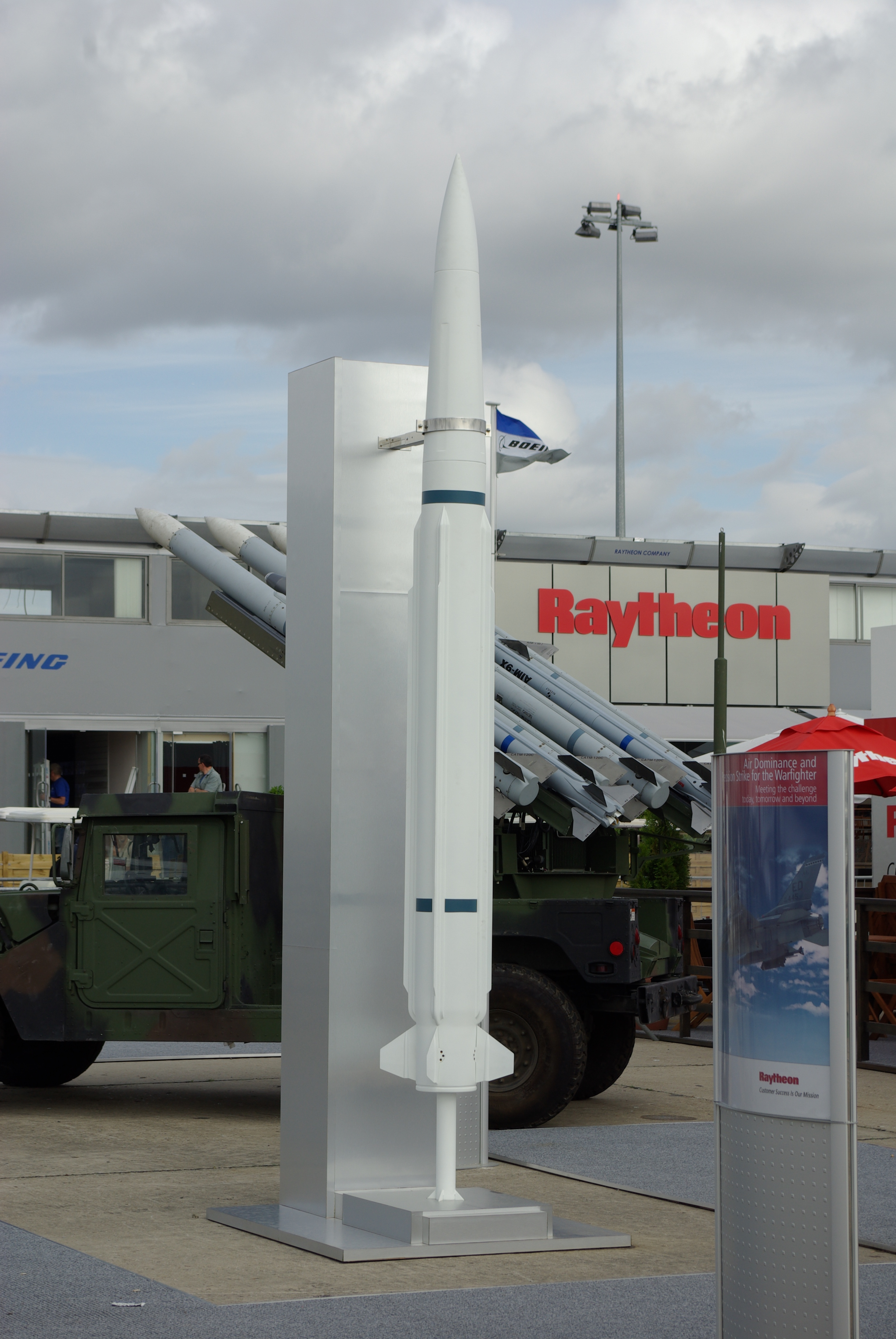
AMRAAM-ER displayed at Paris Air Show 2007

As part of the SLAMRAAM project, Raytheon offered the Extended Range upgrade to surface-launched AMRAAM, called AMRAAM-ER. The missile is an Evolved Sea Sparrow Missile using AMRAAM head with two-stage guidance system. It was first shown at the Paris Air Show 2007 and was test-fired in 2008.

Following the cancellation of SLAMRAAM funding in 2011, development of the NASAMS version restarted in 2014. In February 2015 Raytheon announced the AMRAAM-ER missile option for NASAMS, with expected production in 2019, and the first flight test took place in August 2016. Engagement envelope was expanded with a 50 percent increase in maximum range and 70 percent increase in maximum altitude.

In 2019 Qatar placed an order for AMRAAM-ER missiles as part of a NASAMS purchase.

The missile was testfired at Andøya Space Center in May 2021. In February 2024, Raytheon flight-tested an upgraded version of AMRAAM-ER with an improved rocket motor and control actuator system and an AIM-120C-8 guidance head.

Raytheon has proposed an air-launched adaptation of the missile called AMRAAM-AXE, from "Air-launched Extended Envelope".

On October 25, 2024, the United States government agreed to sell 3 NASAMS system and 123 AMRAAM-ER missiles to Taiwan.

== Foreign sales ==
Canadair, now Bombardier, had largely helped with the development of the AIM-7 Sparrow and Sparrow II, and assisted to a lesser extent in the AIM-120 development. In 2003, the RCAF placed an order for 97 AIM-120C-5 and later C-7 missiles. These missiles have been in service on the CF-18 Hornet since 2004, and fully replaced the AIM-7 Sparrow in the 2010s. In 2020, the Canadian Government was approved by the US DoD for 32 advanced AIM-120D missiles to supplement the AIM-120C stockpile. The package included the 32 active AIM-120D-3 missiles, as well as 18 Captive Training Missiles, and a variety of training equipment and spare parts for $140M. Canada is one of a few countries currently authorized to purchase the longer range AIM-120D missile.

In early 1995 South Korea ordered 88 AIM-120A missiles for its KF-16 fleet. In 1997 South Korea ordered 737 additional AIM-120B missiles.

In 2006 Poland received AIM-120C-5 missiles to arm its new F-16C/D Block 52+ fighters. In 2017 Poland ordered AIM-120C-7 missiles.

In early 2006, the Pakistan Air Force (PAF) ordered 500 AIM-120C-5 AMRAAM missiles as part of a $650 million F-16 ammunition deal to equip its F-16C/D Block 50/52+ and F-16A/B Block 15 MLU fighters. The PAF got the first three F-16C/D Block 50/52+ aircraft on July 3, 2010, and first batch of AMRAAMs on July 26, 2010.

In 2007, the United States government agreed to sell 218 AIM-120C-7 missiles to Taiwan as part of a large arms sales package that also included 235 AGM-65G-2 Maverick missiles. Total value of the package, including launchers, maintenance, spare parts, support and training rounds, was estimated at US$421 million. This supplemented an earlier Taiwanese purchase of 120 AIM-120C-5 missiles a few years ago.

In 2008 there were announcements of new or additional sales to Singapore, Finland, Morocco and South Korea; in December 2010 the Swiss government requested 150 AIM-120C-7 missiles. Sales to Finland have stalled, because the manufacturer has not been able to fix a mysterious bug that causes the rocket motors of the missile to fail in cold tests. On May 5, 2015, the State Department has made a determination approving a possible Foreign Military Sale to Royal Malaysian Air Force for AIM-120C-7 AMRAAM missiles and associated equipment, parts and logistical support for an estimated cost of $21 million.

In March 2016, the US government approved the sales of 36 units of AIM-120C-7 missiles to the Indonesian Air Force to equip their fleet of F-16 C/D Block 25. The AIM-120C-7 is also equipped for the upgraded F-16 A/B Block 15 OCU through Falcon Star-eMLU upgrade project.

In March 2019, the US Department of State and Defense Security Cooperation Agency formally signed off on a US$240.5 million foreign military sale to support Australia's introduction of the NASAMS and LAND 19 Phase 7B program. As part of the deal, the Australian government requested up to 108 Raytheon AIM-120C-7 AMRAAM, six AIM-120C-7 AMRAAM Air Vehicles Instrumented; and six spare AIM-120C-7 AMRAAM guidance sections.

In December 2019, the United States Congress approved the sale of AIM-120C-7/C-8 to the Republic of Korea. According to the Federal Register document, the AIM-120C-8 is a refurbished version of AIM-120C-7, which replaced some discontinued parts with equivalent commercial parts and its capabilities are identical to AIM-120C-7. This was the first time the C-8 version of AMRAAM has appeared in the US arms sales contract. Later, Japan, the Netherlands, the UAE, Spain and Norway received approval to purchase AIM-120C-8s. In November 2021, Saudi Arabia received approval to purchase 280 AIM-120C-7/C-8s.

Canada, United Kingdom, Australia and Norway have been approved to purchase the AIM-120D. Norway ordered 205 AIM-120D and 60 AIM-120D-3 in November 2022, and an unspecified number of AIM-120C-8 in October 2024.

In March 2023, the United States government agreed to sell 200 AIM-120C-8 missiles to Taiwan.

In mid 2023 Germany has requested the purchase of more than 1,000 AIM-120 C8 missiles in addition to the MBDA Meteor which are to be used by the German Air Force.

In November 2023, the Swedish Defence Materiel Administration signed a contract worth US$605 million to purchase the AIM-120C-8, replacing the older AIM-120B, which will be sold back to the US for further donation to Ukraine.

In January 2024, Turkish Air Force ordered 952 AIM-120C-8s included in a larger package of sales worth over US$23 billion.

In October 2024, Argentine Air Force ordered 36 AIM-120C-8s and 2 AIM-120C-8 guidance sections included in a larger package of sales worth over US$941 million.

In July 2025, the US Department of State and Defense Security Cooperation Agency approved a possible Foreign Military Sale to the Government of Egypt of National Advanced Surface-to-Air Missile System and related elements of logistics and program support for an estimated cost of $4.67 billion. This is the first time AIM-120 AMRAAM is sold to Egypt. It includes 100 AMRAAM-ER (Extended Range) missiles, 100 AIM-120C-8 AMRAAMs, 600 AIM-9X Sidewinder Block II missiles, four AN/MPQ-64F1 Sentinel radar systems, among other equipment.

In September 2025, the US Department of State and Defense Security Cooperation Agency approved a Foreign Military Sale to Germany of 400 AIM-120D-3 for $1.23 billion. Germany plans to equip their future fleet of F35 fighters with this missile.

== Future ==
On May 2, 2023, then-Secretary of the Air Force Frank Kendall told the Senate Armed Services Committee that the AIM-260 JATM—the ostensible replacement of the AIM-120–would "hopefully" enter production in 2023, as well as confirming that the JATM is expected to arm the Air Force's upcoming unmanned Collaborative Combat Aircraft.

As of May 2024, the House Armed Services Committee was investigating whether more late-variant AMRAAMs would be required in light of the AIM-260 JATM not having entered full-scale production, despite the USAF having previously stated in May 2023 that AIM-260 development and production was on-schedule. The AIM-260 is believed to have been in initial production by 2024.

In September 2024, Raytheon has suggested that with the range enhancements of the AIM-120D-3, it may serve as a complement to the JATM, rather than be fully-replaced; the JATM would be "very expensive" and would serve as a "kick-the-door-down" weapon while the AMRAAM would be the "affordable" and "capacity" missile.

In March 2025, a $94.5 million contract (titled "AMRAAM Risk Reduction") was awarded to Raytheon in which the Air Force Life Cycle Management Center specifies the program excludes AMRAAM variants "...developed after the AIM-120D (i.e. AIM-120E and beyond)." This led to several sources reporting that an AIM-120E variant was "hinted at". However, an Air Force spokesperson clarified that "we don't have any details that we can provide at this time."

== Operators ==
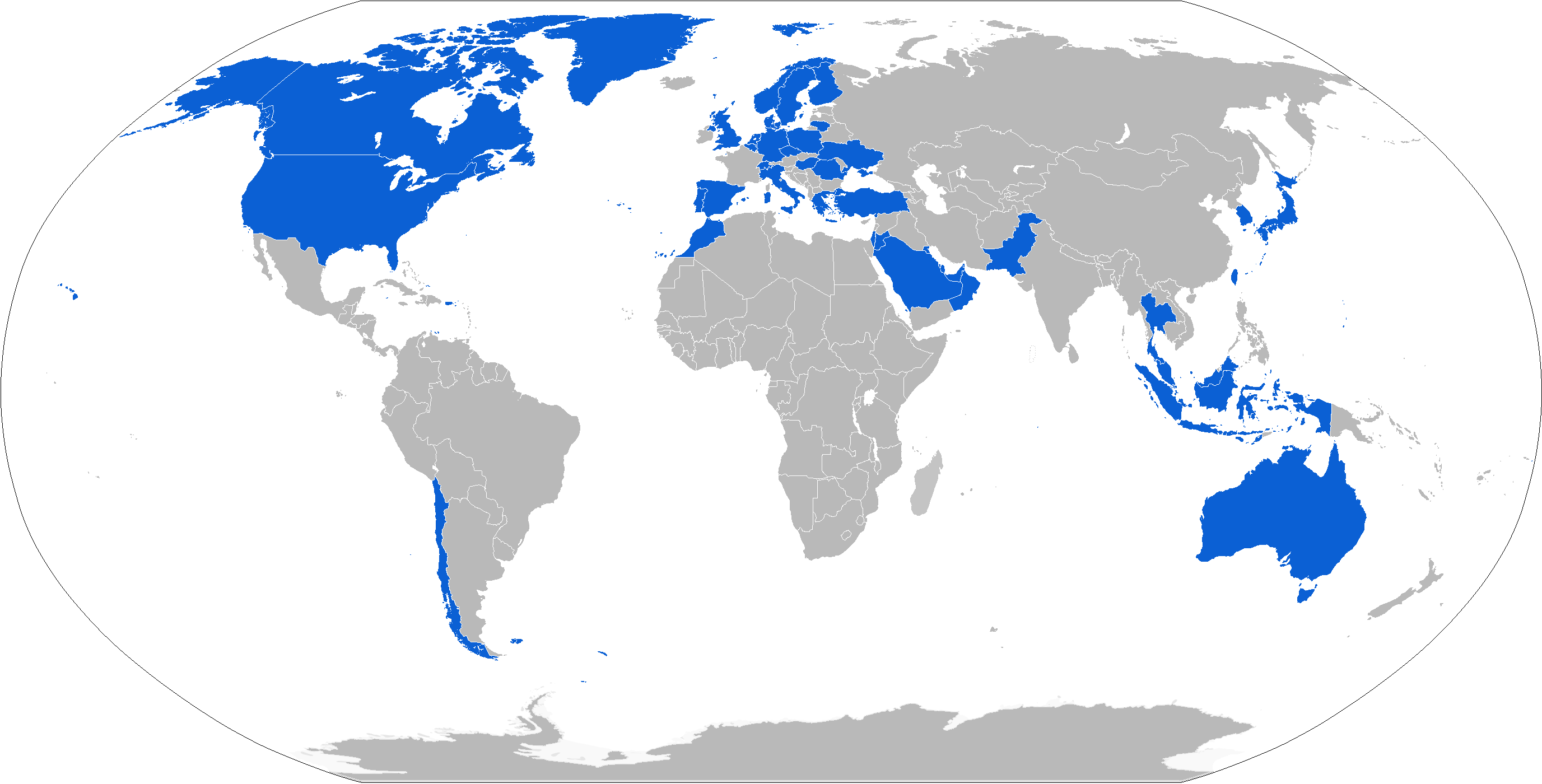
Map with AIM-120 operators in blue

=== Current operators ===
Australia

- Royal Australian Air Force
- Australian Army (NASAMS)

Belgium

- Belgian Air Component

Bahrain

- Royal Bahraini Air Force

Canada

- Royal Canadian Air Force

Chile

- Chilean Air Force

Czech Republic

- Czech Air Force

Denmark

- Royal Danish Air Force

Finland

- Finnish Air Force
- Finnish Army (NASAMS)

Germany

- German Air Force

Greece

- Hellenic Air Force

Hungary

- Hungarian Air Force
- Hungarian Army (NASAMS)

Indonesia

- Indonesian Air Force

Israel

- Israeli Air Force

Italy

- Italian Air Force
- Italian Navy

Japan

- Japan Air Self-Defense Force

Jordan

- Royal Jordanian Air Force

Kuwait

- Kuwait Air Force

Lithuania

- Lithuanian Air Force (NASAMS)

Malaysia

- Royal Malaysian Air Force

Morocco

- Royal Moroccan Air Force

Netherlands

- Royal Netherlands Air Force
- Royal Netherlands Army (NASAMS)

Norway

- Royal Norwegian Air Force
- Royal Norwegian Army (NASAMS)

Oman

- Royal Air Force of Oman

Pakistan

- Pakistan Air Force

Poland

- Polish Air Force

Portugal

- Portuguese Air Force

Qatar

- Qatar Air Force

Romania

- Romanian Air Force

Saudi Arabia

- Royal Saudi Air Force

Singapore

- Republic of Singapore Air Force

South Korea

- Republic of Korea Air Force

Switzerland

- Swiss Air Force

Spain

- Spanish Air Force
- Spanish Army (NASAMS)
- Spanish Navy

Sweden

- Swedish Air Force

Taiwan

- Republic of China Air Force

Thailand

- Royal Thai Air Force

Turkey

- Turkish Air Force

Ukraine

- Ukrainian Air Force

United Arab Emirates

- United Arab Emirates Air Force

United Kingdom

- Royal Air Force
- Fleet Air Arm

United States

- United States Air Force
- United States Navy
- United States Marine Corps

=== Future operators ===
Argentina

- Argentine Air Force

Belgium

- Belgian Land Component (NASAMS)

Bulgaria

- Bulgarian Air Force

Slovak Republic

- Slovak Air Force

== See also ==
- List of missiles

=== Similar weapons ===
- AAM-4 – (Japan)
- AIM-260 JATM – (United States)
- AIM-174B Gunslinger - (United States)
- Astra (missile) – (India)
- MICA – (France)
- Meteor – (France, United Kingdom, Italy, Germany, Spain, Sweden)
- Gökdoğan – (Turkey)
- PL-12 – (China)
- PL-15 – (China)
- Derby – (Israel)
- R-27EA – (Soviet Union)
- R-77 – (Russia)
- Sky Sword II – (Taiwan)
