= Finnish Air Force Band =

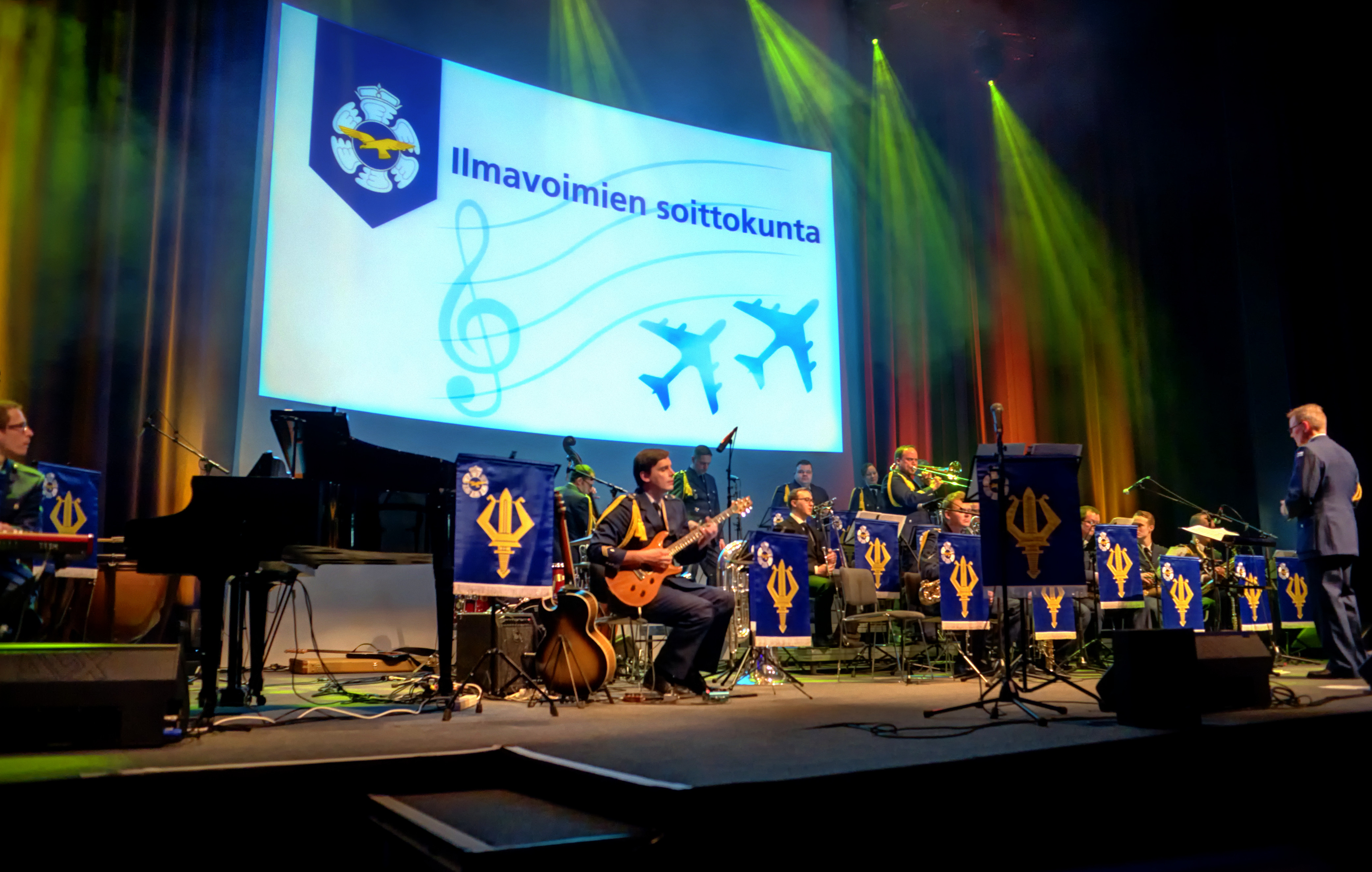
The Air Force Big Band in April 2016.

The Finnish Air Force Band (Finnish: Ilmavoimien soittokunta, ILMAVSK) is the official representative band of the Finnish Air Force. The band is based at the Luonetjärvi garrison in Jyväskylä. The 21-member band is led by Senior Conductor Juha Ketola. It was established in 1977 as the Luonetjärvi Garrison Band (Luonetjärven varuskuntasoittokunta). In 1990, the band was transferred under the command of the Air Force Academy, Finnish Air Force and was given its current title of Finnish Air Force Band. When marching on parade, the unit performs as a wind band. The band is one of the only bands in the Finnish Defence Force to maintain a fanfare team.

== Ensembles ==
The following six units are ensembles of the air force band:

- Air Force Parade Band
- Air Force Big Band
- Air Force Wind Band
- Air Force Brass Quintet
- Air Force Groove Band
- Air Force Jazz Combo

== Discography ==
The band has released the following albums:

- Air Play (1980)
- The Squadron Sings and Plays (1981)
- Hallinportti (1981)
- Evening Flight (1996)
- The Black Flag Unites with Jokilaakso Singers and Petter Ohls (2000)
- Karelia yearns... with Jokilaakso Singers and Petter Ohls (2004)
- Heart in Finland (2008).
- Aaltoja / Waves (2016)
- KAJO (2017)
- Landscape Portraits of Finland with Pepa Päivinen (2019)

== Links ==
- The band in 1983
