= Rami Koivisto =

Finnish ice hockey forward (born 1968)

- Born: April 28, 1968 (age 56); Helsinki, Finland
- Height: 5 ft 10 in (178 cm)
- Weight: 194 lb (88 kg; 13 st 12 lb)
- Position: Forward
- Shot: Right
- Played for: Jokerit; Dragons de Rouen; Brest Albatros Hockey; Brûleurs de Loups
- Playing career: 1990–2003; 2007–2008

Rami Koivisto (born April 28, 1968) is a Finnish former professional ice hockey forward.

Koivisto spent four seasons playing for Jokerit of SM-liiga between 1991 and 1995. He played 164 games, scoring 42 goals and 33 assists for 75 points.He also played in France for Dragons de Rouen, Brest Albatros Hockey and Brûleurs de Loups.

Retired in 2003, Koivisto came out of retirement during the 2007–08 season, playing ten games with 2. Divisioona side NuPS Hockey. He later became head coach for Viikingit and NuPS.
