= Henrik Koivisto =

Finnish ice hockey player

- Born: 9 April 1990 (age 34); Kerava, Finland
- Height: 5 ft 10 in (178 cm)
- Weight: 169 lb (77 kg; 12 st 1 lb)
- Position: Forward
- Shoots: Left
- Liiga team Former teams: HIFK; Jukurit Kiekko-Vantaa; Jokerit; Lukko; Sport
- NHL draft: Undrafted
- Playing career: 2011–present

Henrik Koivisto (born 9 April 1990) is a Finnish professional ice hockey player. He is currently on a tryout contract for HIFK of the Finnish Liiga.

Koivisto made his Liiga debut playing with Jokerit during the 2013-14 Liiga season.
