= Erikoisjoukot =

Finnish reality television program

- Genre: Reality television Tracking reality
- Based on: SAS: Who Dares Wins by Minnow Films
- Directed by: Edward Kojonen (1–2); Mikko Lehtonen (3–)
- Starring: Janne Lehtonen; Jan Knutti; Matias Petäistö; Robin Hendry
- Narrated by: Mikko Leskelä
- Country of origin: Finland
- Original language: Finnish
- No. of series: 4
- No. of episodes: 52 (list of episodes)

Production
- Executive producers: Alex Laszlo; Tatu Ferchen
- Producer: Maija Maukonen
- Production location: Lohja
- Running time: 45–67 minutes
- Production company: Banijay Finland

Original release
- Network: Ruutu; Nelonen
- Release: 2 January 2023 – present

Related
- International versions

Erikoisjoukot (Finnish, 'Special Forces') is a Finnish quasi-military training television programme based on the British SAS: Who Dares Wins format. The show first premiered on streaming service Ruutu in May 2022, and later premiered on Nelonen network early 2023. The second season began to air in March 2024, with a third season being confirmed by the channel to air in 2025.

During the three first seasons of the program, it became the most viewed finnish original series of Ruutu streaming service ever, with over 400,000 launches on the platform. Before the end of the 3rd season, one of the instructors of the show, Jan Knutti told in an estonian YouTube podcast that they have already confirmed two further seasons, set to be filmed back-to-back in summer of 2025.

== Format ==
Following the premise of the original, British adaption, a group of celebrities are put into a shortened version of the Special Forces’ selection course. Over the course of two weeks, the recruits must face their fears and complete in various tasks designed for those who aspire for the Finland's Defence Forces' Special Forces. At the end of the course, the Head Instructor and his fellow Directing Staff will decide, who has passed the selection process.

The conditions of the recruits during the course are considered rudimental as they reflect a real combat base. They are accommodated at the Abandoned Limestone Factory in the town of Lohja, the surrounding environment of which is not only versatile, but one of the roughest in the country. The recruits will not receive any special treatment, but will be completely at the mercy of the Directing Staff.

Unlike many other reality competition series, there are no straight eliminations. However, the recruits can be culled by the Staff, or withdrawn, in case of any injuries or medical reasons to be quitted from the course. The recruits can also decide themselves, to voluntarily withdraw from the competition, if the pressures are getting too high – and hand their armband to one of the Directing Staff instructors.

== Cast ==
The Directing Staff consists of four ex-Special Forces soldiers of the Finnish Defence Forces, with the combined experience of over four decades of war fighting and operations. The Head Instructor ('Pääkouluttaja') is Janne Lehtonen, an ex-Finnish Navy Special Forces Sergeant, Combat Diver, Scout Sniper and Combat Medic in Counter-Terrorism contracts, with over 13 years of experience on the fronts. The other Directing Staff instructors are: Jan Knutti, a former Navy Combat Diver and Finnish Border Guard's Officer for the Counter-Terrorism unit; Matias Petäistö, a former Pioneer and team leader for the Finnish Army's Utti Jaeger Regiment; and Robin Hendry, a former Navy's Combat Diver and Combat Medic. Keeping up the medical supervising of the recruits is Antti Oksanen, ex-military, and professional surgeon.

Name	Position	Series					
Name	Position	1 (2022)	2 (2024)	3 (Spring 2025)	4 (Autumn 2025)	5 (Spring 2026)	6 (Autumn 2026)
Sgt. Janne Lehtonen	Head Instructor	Main					
Jan Knutti	Directing Staff	Main					
Matias Petäistö	Directing Staff	Main					
Robin Hendry	Directing Staff	Main					
"Aspen"	The Hunting Dog / DS	—N/a	Guest	Main			
"Rossi"	Hunting Dog / DS	—N/a				Guest	—N/a
Jessica Reiman	Undercover Mole	—N/a		Guest	—N/a		
MD. Antti Oksanen	Head Medical	Main					
Vilho Ahola	Psychologist	—N/a				Main	—N/a

== Seasons ==
=== Series overview ===
Series	Title	Episodes	Originally released	
Series	Title	Episodes	First released	Last released
1	Toughest Reality on Finnish TV	10	2 January 2023 (Note: The show was first introduced on Ruutu streaming service in summer 2022, and the first episode actually aired on television that year. However, the full official run on TV, with all episodes, started in January 2023.)	27 February 2023
2	Breaking Point	13	12 March 2024	4 June 2024
3	At The Limits of Tolerance	13	18 March 2025	10 June 2025
4	Fight, Break, Rise.	16	4 September 2025	18 December 2025
5	Only Strongest Survive	16	24 February 2026	9 June 2026

=== Winners ===
Season	Winners
1	Elias Kaskinen, Amanda Harkimo and Viivi Altonen
2	Aleksi Hakanen, Elina Gustafsson, Oona Tolppanen and Noora Räty
3	Riku Nieminen and Hanna Tikander
4	Mika Poutala
5	Joonas Vuorela and Martina Aitolehti

=== Season 1 (2023) ===
The filming began on early August 2021 at Abandoned Limestone Factory, in the city of Lohja, Finland. 14 well-known finnish Celebrities took part in this Season.

==== Recruits ====
Recruit	Celebrity	Known for	Episode left	Status
1	Ville Lång	Badminton player	10	Culled
2	Henna Virkkunen	Member of the European Parliament	4	Culled
3	Sauli Koskinen	Media personality	7	Voluntarily Withdrew
4	Amanda Harkimo	Reality TV star, DJ	10	Passed
5	James Nikander	Rap-artist, "The Black Barbarian"	3	Culled
6	Sara Chafak	Miss Finland 2012	1	Voluntarily Withdrew
7	Heikki Sorsa	Snowboarder	7	Voluntarily Withdrew
8	Sami Jauhojärvi	Former cross-country skier	6	Voluntarily Withdrew
9	Amin Asikainen	Former professional boxer	6	Culled
10	Sunneva Sjögrén	Beauty entrepreneur	1	Voluntarily Withdrew
11	Kimmo Ohtonen	Journalist	10	Culled
12	Tom Packalén	Member of Parliament	7	Medically Withdrew
13	Viivi Altonen	Miss Finland 2020	10	Passed
14	Elias Kaskinen	Singer-Songwriter	10	Passed

==== Episodes ====
No.	Title (in English)	Timeslot (EET)	Original release date	Finnish viewers
1	"Character"	Monday 9:00 pm	2 January 2023	N/A
2	"Fear"	Monday 9:00 pm	9 January 2023	N/A
3	"Aggression"	Monday 9:00 pm	16 January 2023	N/A
4	"Control"	Monday 9:00 pm	23 January 2023	N/A
5	"Decisionmaking"	Monday 9:00 pm	30 January 2023	N/A
6	"Sisu"	Monday 9:00 pm	6 February 2023	N/A
7	"Trust"	Monday 9:00 pm	13 February 2023	N/A
8	"Power of Mind"	Monday 9:00 pm	20 February 2023	125,000
9	"Survival"	Monday 10:00 pm	27 February 2023	64,000
10	"Pressure Tolerance"	Monday 11:00 pm	27 February 2023	N/A

=== Season 2 (2024) ===
The 15 celebrity recruits of the second season were revealed in January 2024. Like the first season, this season was filmed at the abandoned Limestone Factory in Lohja, in autumn of 2023. At the end of the season, there is an "Aftermath" episode, in which the recruits and instructors gather to discuss about their journey.

==== Recruits ====
Recruit	Celebrity	Known for	Episode left	Status
1	Mika Parikka	Reporter, radio presenter	2	Voluntarily Withdrew
2	Susanna Koski	Politician	7	Culled
3	Tuomas Kauhanen	Rap-artist	1	Voluntarily Withdrew
4	Mandimai Sundberg	Social media influencer	2	Voluntarily Withdrew
5	Aleksi Hakanen	Social media personality	12	Passed
6	Vertti Harjuniemi	Fitness influencer, Gladiators-star "Titan"	12	Culled
7	Mari Valosaari	Radio presenter, former fitness athlete	6	Culled
8	Pierlin Mpaka Makumbu	Rap-artist, "PapiPike"	1	Voluntarily Withdrew
9	Petra Gargano	Former singer of Tiktak	4	Voluntarily Withdrew
10	Helmeri Pirinen	Professional scooterist	8	Medically Withdrew
11	Oona Tolppanen	Fitness entrepreneur, Gladiators-star "Sapphire"	12	Passed
12	Anni Vuohijoki	Former Olympics weightlifter	4	Voluntarily Withdrew
13	Sami Garam	Cook	5	Voluntarily Withdrew
14	Noora Räty	Ice hockey goaltender and coach	12	Passed
15	Elina Gustafsson	Ex-boxer	12	Passed

==== Episodes ====
No.	Title (in English)	Timeslot (EET)	Original release date	Finnish viewers
1	"Character"	Tuesday 9:00 pm	12 March 2024	227,000
2	"Fortitude"	Tuesday 9:00 pm	19 March 2024	245,000
3	"Leadership"	Tuesday 9:00 pm	26 March 2024	233,000
4	"Tolerance"	Tuesday 9:00 pm	2 April 2024	272,000
5	"Performance"	Tuesday 9:00 pm	9 April 2024	263,000
6	"Sisu"	Tuesday 9:00 pm	16 April 2024	259,000
7	"Control"	Tuesday 9:00 pm	23 April 2024	245,000
8	"Instinct"	Tuesday 9:00 pm	30 April 2024	206,000
9	"Confidence"	Tuesday 9:00 pm	7 May 2024	238,000
10	"Endurance"	Tuesday 9:00 pm	14 May 2024	241,000
11	"Fear"	Tuesday 8:00 pm	21 May 2024	178,000
12	"The Final Test"	Tuesday 9:00 pm	28 May 2024	218,000
13	"Aftermath"	Tuesday 9:00 pm	4 June 2024	156,000

=== Season 3 (Spring 2025) ===
The third season was filmed at the factory on Lohja in October 2024, and is airing in Spring 2025. Seventeen celebrity recruits took part in this season. As a gamechanging feature for the season, one of the recruits, Jessica Reiman is the "spy" or "mole" set by the Directing Staff, whose mission is to constantly keep up with the recruits, and leak information about them to the staff.

During the airing of the season, the show became the most watched finnish Original series on Ruutu service with over 400,000 monthly launches, whilst the live TV channel viewing numbers decreased notably.

==== Recruits ====
Recruit	Celebrity	Known for	Episode left	Status
1	Michael Ntima	Entrepreneur	2	Voluntarily Withdrew
2	Janne Kopari	Entrepreneur	8	Culled
3	Ansku Bergström	Choreographer from Tanssii tähtien kanssa	1	Voluntarily Withdrew
4	Jessica Reiman	Personal trainer, former lieutenant of the Defence Forces	5	Undercover Mole
5	Kerttu Rissanen	Fitness trainer, former Salatut elämät actress	12	Culled
6	Eino Heiskanen	Actor	7	Culled
7	Mira Ahola	Well-being coach	9	Culled
8	Ömer Acar	Private dentist and nature photographer	9	Culled
9	Viljami Harjuniemi	Advertisement entrepreneur	12	Culled
10	Riku Nieminen	Actor	12	Passed
11	Ville Kaunisto	Politician	2	Medically Withdrew
12	Daniel Ahola	Media personality	11	Culled
13	Jasmine Pajari	Presenter	4	Culled
14	Rami Hietaniemi	Ex-greco roman wrestler	7	Culled
15	Hanna Tikander	Podcast-host	12	Passed
16	Paula Joukanen	Miss Finland 2023	1	Voluntarily Withdrew
17	Jari Sorsa	Personal trainer	5	Culled

==== Episodes ====
No.	Title (in English)	Timeslot (EET)	Original release date	Finnish viewers
1	"Character"	Tuesday 9:00 pm	18 March 2025	188,000
2	"Trust"	Tuesday 9:00 pm	25 March 2025	188,000
3	"Self-control"	Tuesday 9:00 pm	1 April 2025	187,000
4	"Leadership"	Tuesday 9:00 pm	8 April 2025	162,000
5	"Motivation"	Tuesday 9:00 pm	15 April 2025	157,000
6	"Responsibility"	Tuesday 9:00 pm	22 April 2025	171,000
7	"Panic"	Tuesday 9:00 pm	29 April 2025	182,000
8	"Fear"	Tuesday 9:00 pm	6 May 2025	168,000
9	"Control"	Tuesday 9:00 pm	13 May 2025	170,000
10	"Tolerance"	Tuesday 9:00 pm	20 May 2025	133,000
11	"Survival part 1"	Tuesday 9:00 pm	27 May 2025	193,000
12	"Survival part 2"	Tuesday 9:00 pm	3 June 2025	189,000
13	"Aftermath"	Tuesday 9:00 pm	10 June 2025	107,000

=== Season 4 (Autumn 2025) ===
Filming of the fourth season began in May 2025 in Lohja, making it the program's first season filmed in the summer conditions of Finland. 16 more celebrity recruits embark on the course, that airs from September 2025. As a new element, the directing staff split the recruits into two "teams" ("Alpha" & "Bravo") in which they work together for the first part of the season. For this season, the staff also follow the recruits' well-being more close than ever, including with real-time heart rate monitoring and recovery statistics, to get a larger-scale view on the recruits.

==== Recruits ====
Recruit	Celebrity	Known for	Episode left	Status
1	Karoliina Blackburn	Actress	3	Culled
2	Mika Poutala	Politician, former speed skater	16	Passed
3	Nico Salo	Floorball player	16	Culled
4	Sonja Aiello	Well-being coach	13	Culled
5	Mauro Severino	Clothing designer	2	Voluntarily Withdrew
6	Iida Ketola	Hairdresser	7	Culled
7	Arttu Kuosmanen	Rock artist, "Archie Cruz"	1	Voluntarily Withdrew
8	Aleksi Rantamaa	Podcast host	1	Voluntarily Withdrew
9	Noora Toivo	Sports reporter on Yle	16	Culled
10	Mikko Kekäläinen	Journalist, presenter	15	Culled
11	Elina Mäkinen	Ice swimmer	13	Culled
12	Mikael Renwall	Content creator	4	Voluntarily Withdrew
13	Robert Helenius	Ex-boxer	16	Culled
14	Tiia Aalto	Miss Suomi contestant	4	Voluntarily Withdrew
15	Nino Ärling	Content creator	12	Culled
16	Markus Pöyhönen	Coach, former sprinter	1	Voluntarily Withdrew

==== Episodes ====
No.	Title (in English)	Timeslot (EET)	Original release date	Finnish viewers
1	"Character"	Thursday 9:00 pm	4 September 2025	157,000
2	"Aggression"	Thursday 9:00 pm	11 September 2025	146,000
3	"Leadership"	Thursday 9:00 pm	18 September 2025	137,000
4	"Surrender"	Thursday 9:00 pm	25 September 2025	132,000
5	"Tolerance"	Thursday 9:00 pm	2 October 2025	112,000
6	"Panic"	Thursday 9:00 pm	9 October 2025	114,000
7	"Readiness"	Thursday 9:00 pm	16 October 2025	118,000
8	"Conflict"	Thursday 9:00 pm	23 October 2025	115,000
9	"Fear"	Thursday 9:00 pm	30 October 2025	112,000
10	"Motivation"	Thursday 9:00 pm	6 November 2025	119,000
11	"Terror"	Thursday 9:00 pm	13 November 2025	126,000
12	"Decision"	Thursday 9:00 pm	20 November 2025	95,000
13	"Self-esteem"	Thursday 9:00 pm	27 November 2025	124,000
14	"Suffering"	Thursday 9:00 pm	4 December 2025	134,000
15	"Freedom"	Thursday 9:00 pm	11 December 2025	N/A
16	"Finale"	Thursday 9:00 pm	18 December 2025	N/A

=== Season 5 (Spring 2026) ===
15 new Celebrity recruits undergo 11-day Special forces training camp. The season was filmed after the fourth season in June 2025, at Lohja. New psychologist Vilho Ahola joins the instructors, with a duty of ensuring nobody quits this season with ease.

==== Recruits ====
Recruit	Celebrity	Known for	Episode left	Status
1	Samuli Jaskio	Actor	2	Voluntarily Withdrew
2	Pinja Sanaksenaho	Social media personality	16	Culled
3	Joona Puhakka	Social media personality	2	Voluntarily Withdrew
4	Tuomo Kasanen	Content creator, active reservist	8	Voluntarily Withdrew
5	Julia Kykkänen	Ski jumper	7	Voluntarily Withdrew
6	Tomi Långstedt	Speaker	4	Medically Withdrew
7	Osmo Ikonen	Artist	13	Culled
8	Janne Nevalainen	Content creator	5	Medically Withdrew
9	Martina Aitolehti	Entrepreneur, wellness coach	16	Passed
10	Pinja Perholehto	Politician	3	Culled
11	Tero Heikkilä	Content creator	12	Voluntarily Withdrew
12	Terhi Lumme	Weightlifter, Gladiators star "Cobra"	12	Culled
13	Joonas Vuorela	Podcast host	16	Passed
14	Mira Potkonen	European champion boxer	16	Culled
15	Melina Mäkelä	Radio host	5	Culled

==== Episodes ====
No.	Title (in English)	Timeslot (EET)	Original release date	Finnish viewers
1	"Deep End"	Tuesday 9:00 pm	24 February 2026	262,000
2	"Breaking Point"	Tuesday 9:00 pm	3 March 2026	151,000
3	"Limit"	Tuesday 9:00 pm	10 March 2026	156,000
4	"Drop"	Tuesday 9:00 pm	17 March 2026	160,000
5	"Firing Line"	Tuesday 9:00 pm	24 March 2026	142,000
6	"Shame"	Tuesday 9:00 pm	31 March 2026	141,000
7	"Close Combat"	Tuesday 9:00 pm	7 April 2026	126,000
8	"Danger of Life"	Tuesday 9:00 pm	14 April 2026	152,000
9	"Reconnaissance"	Tuesday 9:00 pm	21 April 2026	118,000
10	"Leadership"	Tuesday 9:00 pm	28 April 2026	128,000
11	"Falling"	Tuesday 9:00 pm	5 May 2026	163,000
12	"At Surface"	Tuesday 9:00 pm	12 May 2026	118,000
13	"Decision"	Tuesday 9:00 pm	19 May 2026	124,000
14	"Endurance"	Tuesday 9:00 pm	26 May 2026	113,000
15	"Trust"	Tuesday 9:00 pm	2 June 2026	147,000
16	"The End"	Tuesday 9:00 pm	9 June 2026	N/A

=== Season 6 (Autumn 2026) ===
A further, sixth season of the program was announced in the late 2026 Nelonen Media's official programme. Filmed during Spring of 2026, it is teased to be even more intense than its previous seasons.

No.	Title (in English)	Timeslot (EET)	Original release date	Finnish viewers
1	"First Shock"	Thursday 9:00 pm	3 September 2026	174,000
2	"Starting Point"	Thursday 9:00 pm	10 September 2026	N/A
3	"Acid Test"	Thursday 9:00 pm	17 September 2026	N/A
4	"Extremes"	Thursday 9:00 pm	24 September 2026	TBD
5	"Breaking point"	Thursday 9:00 pm	1 October 2026	TBD
6	"Fear"	Thursday 9:00 pm	8 October 2026	TBD
7	"Close combat"	Thursday 9:00 pm	15 October 2026	TBD

== Reception ==
=== Critical reception ===
The show has formed mixed reception. While some television viewers have been pleased and open minded towards the format, many people disagree with the physical and mental pain the recruits will have to go through in the series. Some authors of Helsingin Sanomat have criticed for the pointless "maltreatment" of the recruits, and that it "won't raise one's health". For the response, the Head Instructor of the program, Sergeant Janne Lehtonen has said, that "everything on the program has a purpose", and that "by stretching the limits of human body, people can find new sides and characteristics from themselves".

=== Awards and nominations ===
Year	Awards	Category	Nominated	Result	Ref.
2022	Golden Venla	Tracking Reality	Erikoisjoukot	Nominated	
2024	Golden Venla	Tracking Reality	Erikoisjoukot	Nominated	
2025	Golden Venla	Tracking Reality	Erikoisjoukot	Nominated	

== See also ==
- SAS: Who Dares Wins
