= Janne Lehtonen =

Finnish ex-soldier and television personality (born 1983)

- Born: 24 March 1983 (age 43); Helsinki, Uusimaa, Finland
- Military career
- Allegiance: Finland
- Branch: Finnish Navy
- Service years: 13
- Rank: Sergeant
- Nickname: Janezkyy (Note: Comes from his Instagram account and nickname/cover name in the Navy during international operations.)
- Unit: 5th Mine Warfare Squadron
- Conflicts: War in Afghanistan; Somali piracy
- Other work: Television personality; Entrepreneur; Firefighter; Author

Janne Lehtonen (born 24 March 1983), sometimes referred to by his nickname 'Janezkyy', is a Finnish entrepreneur, firefighter, and former Special Operation Forces soldier for the Finnish Navy, who is known for appearing in finnish reality television show Erikoisjoukot as the Head Instructor, and competing in adventure show Amazing Race Suomi. He is known to be one of the very first people to be recruited to the official Finnish Special Forces of the Navy.

== Career ==
=== Military service ===
Lehtonen, interested at visual arts when younger, served on the Finnish Navy's Special Operation Forces (SOF) unit for 13 years. In the early 2000's, he was one of the very first people that got in to the Finland's Special Forces of the Navy, upon the unit's discovery in the Gulf of Finland Naval Command, present day Coastal Brigade in Upinniemi. There he worked on the Finnish minelayer Pohjanmaa of the 5th Mine Warfare Squadron. Originally trained as a combat diver, Lehtonen served for the Defence Forces in multiple tours of duty, including in Iraq, Afghanistan and Somalia twice, and fought against terrorism and piracy. He also served as a sniper and combat medic for several years. During one of the operations, his group did catch 18 pirates. He was also rescuing Kenyan hostages stuck in their vessels.

In 2015, he moved to the private sector to work for a finnish private security company, which brought him back to Afghanistan for person security missions. Since the Russian invasion of Ukraine broke in 2022, Lehtonen has actively been standing for the Ukrainians, and offered them his military experience and trained them.

=== Television ===
In 2022, he started as the head instructor in finnish reality television show Erikoisjoukot, alongside other instructors, ex-soldiers Jan Knutti, Matias Petäistö and Robin Hendry. In 2023, Lehtonen competed in the first season of the Finnish version of The Amazing Race with his ex-Special Forces colleague Robin Hendry. Amongst the twelve competing teams, the pair placed third in the competition. He has also appeared in a finnish talk-show Puoli seitsemän.

During his appearance in Amazing Race Suomi with (Robin) Hendry, Lehtonen has told that he had become "more approachable" amongst the television viewers, who saw him first on Erikoisjoukot as a "tough instructor", and that showing his real human side has had "positive impact on his brand and work career".

=== Publications ===
Lehtonen is also an author; his first biography was officially published in May 2025 in corporation with Kati Pukki, publisher of WSOY. In his book, Lehtonen writes about his childhood, how he became a Special Forces operator and what some of the operations held in.

=== Other ===
Since leaving the Special Operations, Lehtonen has worked at the Helsinki Rescue Service and Fire Station, before shifting to the Helsinki-Vantaa Airport, as a firefighter and paramedic with former Special Forces colleague Robin Hendry. He has run his own tattoo studio and co-owns a CrossFit gym, CrossFit Woima, at his hometown Kerava. He has also regularly held public speeches about important topics; such as physical and mental health, motivation and leadership.

== Personal life ==
Lehtonen was born and raised in the capital region. In civil life, he was married to Mia-Riitta Lehtonen, his partner since teenage years. They have two children and they divorced in 2024.

He has post-traumatic stress disorder (PTSD), and has told that the traumatic "close call" experiences he had experienced on the Special Forces have still left marks in his head. He has however got help and spoken about it to be able to "control" the feelings better.

== Filmography ==
Year	Series	Role	Channel	Notes	Ref.
2022–present	Erikoisjoukot	Head Instructor	Nelonen	3 series	
2023	Amazing Race Suomi	Himself; contestant	Nelonen	1 series	
