= Sissi (Finnish light infantry) =

Sissi troops
- Active: Reserve unit
- Country: Finland
- Branch: Finnish Army; Finnish Border Guard; Finnish Navy
- Type: Light infantry

Sissi is a Finnish term for light infantry which conducts border security, commando style raids on key targets, guerrilla warfare, long-range penetration, reconnaissance, and sabotage operations behind enemy lines.

The word sissi, first attested in the modern meaning "patrolman, partisan, spy" in 1787, comes to Finnish from Slavic and refers either to a forest bandit or his yew bow.

The Finnish Army trained Sissi units to conduct commando style raids on key targets (short-duration strikes or small-scale offensive actions), conduct road side ambushes, frontline military intelligence gathering from concealed observation posts, long-range reconnaissance, pursue and destroy enemy commandos or special forces units, and sabotage enemy installations (especially supply depots).

In wartime, an unspecified number of reservists were to be assigned to Sissi battalions and would deploy and operate as small groups up to company size. They were meant to either infiltrate through enemy lines to their rear, or stay behind and clandestine operates against enemy forces in their area of responsibility even after regular friendly troops had been forced to retreat. Sissi battalions were part of Finnish Army "local troops", unlike the jäger and armored brigades meant for operational use.

In official Finnish military parlance, the word "sissi" has been largely phased out. For example, the Sissi company of the Lappi Border Guard of the Finnish Border Guard was renamed to "Border Jaeger Company" in 1994. The conscripts serving in the unit were concurrently renamed to Border Jaegers. Similarly, Finnish Army sissi units are now called "reconnaissance" units, and the personnel serving in them called "tiedustelija", "reconnaissance man". A notable exception are the sissiradisti or Sissi signalists.

== History ==
Wars between Russia and Finland have a long tradition of Finnish sissi warfare. Famous sissi leaders have included Pekka Vesainen (c. 1540–1627), Tapani Löfving (1689–1777, fought during the Greater Wrath), and Olli Tiainen (1770–1833, fought during the Finnish War).

Before the hostilities of Winter War, the Finnish Borderguard formed 25 Independent Battalions (Erillinen Pataljoona) from local reservists along the border area. After the outbreak of hostilities, a further five Sissi Battalions (Sissipataljoona) were formed from "auxiliary personnel". These battalions, especially those of the latter type, were below their nominal strength in both men and weaponry. These units proved to be effective in using motti tactics in their native area with light infantry weapons and skis.

In the Continuation War the ad hoc Sissi Battalions were replaced by Independent Battalions. For example, the 4th Independent Battalion was directly under the command of Supreme Headquarters doing LRRP and raiding missions deep inside Soviet area. In the Battle of Ilomantsi, soldiers of the 4th disrupted the supply lines of the Soviet artillery, preventing effective fire support.

In the Ladoga Karelia area of operations the length of the front, the absence of roads and a lack of troops prevented continuous front lines during the trench warfare period. Both armies used a chain of fortified field bases separated by the wilderness, monitoring and controlling the gaps with patrols. Both Finns and Soviet partisans launched raids and recon patrols into enemy territory. Battles were short clashes of lightly armed infantry groups from squadron to battalion in size, with little chance of support or reinforcements.

After the Second World War, Sissi units were decommissioned and Sissi training was officially discontinued, although many units gave Sissi training for their reconnaissance units. In the beginning of the 1960s, the Paratrooper School was established at Utti, and both infantry and border guard units established Sissi training companies thereafter.

== Famous Sissi troops ==
- Ilmari Honkanen, officer in 4th Independent Battalion (ErP 4). Known especially from the destruction of the Soviet military depot in Petrovski Jam.
- Lauri Törni a.k.a. Larry Thorne, a commander of "Detachment Törni", the reconnaissance company of the 12th Infantry Regiment during the Continuation War, had a bounty on his head by the Soviets, joined Waffen-SS in 1940 and was sent back home before the Continuation War. After the Finno-Soviet ceasefire he returned to Waffen-SS because he did not believe that Soviets would actually follow the ceasefire agreement. After the war Törni joined US Army and volunteered for the United States Army Special Forces (Green Berets).
- Mauno Koivisto, member of "Detachment Törni" during the Continuation War, later the President of Finland.
- Mikko Pöllä, most decorated member of the ErP 4.
- Onni Määttänen.
- Paavo Suoranta (Peltonen).
- Viljo Suokas.
- Paavo Ilmola, Finnish lieutenant general wrote operations manual Sissisota, sen edellytykset ja sodankäynnin suuntaviivat (Prerequisites and lineage of guerilla warfare). Written in 1958 it was declassified by Finnish Defence Forces (FDF) in 2016.

== Term and use ==
The Finnish terms "sissi" translates to English as "'guerrilla.'" This use of the terms is, however, misleading when referring to Finnish Defence Force Sissi troops. Sissi forces were not irregular guerrilla or militia forces. They were part of the regular FDF troops trained for operations behind enemy lines. Like most of the Finnish Defence Forces, Sissi battalions are composed of military reserve forces. Their closest foreign equivalents are the Swedish Armed Forces Jägare troops.

Despite the phasing out of the term in official use, "sissi" continues to be used in both in Finnish military slang and in everyday speech. The word "sissi" can also be used as a description is a person of extraordinary stamina (or Sisu) or as an adjective. It is also used as an umbrella term for all unconventional or "in-the-field" military applications. For example, MREs are known as "Sissi rations"; improvised and/or temporary repair to any equipment are called "sissiviritys" (literally "sissi fix" or "sissi patch") and improvised booby-traps, such as firearms rigged to fire at doorway of a building once someone opens the door, may be called "sissijäynä", literally "sissi prank". "Sissi weather" (Sissin sää) refers to the worst possible weather conditions, for sissi soldiers prefer these for their operations, since bad weather tends to distract enemy soldiers (any normal soldier tends to think about getting to shelter as soon as possible when bad weather strikes) and hide any noise caused by sissis.

== Training ==
The training of the Sissi troops was not centralized, but they were historically trained in several Finnish Defence Force brigades as well as in the Sissi companies of the Finnish Border Guard. Reserve officers for all Sissi troops were trained at Reserve Officer School (Reserviupseerikoulu). Officers receive more training in their course in Special Operations, etc.

The Sissi conscripts were given training in ambush tactics, artillery observer, building concealed observation posts, camouflaged to fit into the terrains, close-quarters battle, counter-sniper tactics, defusing and disposal of bombs and land mines, demolitions, extended small arms training as well as training in advanced evasion and escape techniques, extraction with helicopters, frontline military intelligence gathering, hand-to-hand combat, long-range reconnaissance, marksmanship, military communication, raiding with small unit tactics, subarctic terrain survival skills, tactical first aid, tactical hand and arm signals, using a military maps and compass, and using tactical skis and snowmobiles.

Those unable to cope for either physical or psychological reasons were either given deferments or transferred to a regular infantry training.

== Weapons and equipment ==
While the Sissi troops were not motorized or equipped with heavy weapons or equipment, they were primarily issued the same uniforms and weaponry as the regular infantry. Distinctive personal equipment used by Sissi were Savotta "Para Jäger" backpacks used because of extended hikes, camouflage paints and personal camouflage nets. Sissi units had fewer crew-served weapons and more sniper rifles than regular infantry.

Mines were an important part of the Sissi tactic of ambushing enemy convoys. They were also used to discourage pursuit after raids and served as defences of bivouac. Sissi training included construction of improvised explosive devices, as well as booby traps. Sissi units had at their disposal a wide variety of land mines and other explosive devices, such as:

- Track Mine TM 65 77 (AT mine)
- Pipe Explosion Device 68 95 (AP Explosion Device) sometimes called "ovikello", "doorbell."
- Anti-personnel mine 65 98 (AP mine)
- Side Explosion Device 87 (AT Mine)
- Side Explosion Device 81 (AT Mine)
- VP 88 Claymore (AP Explosion Device )
- VP 84 Claymore (AP Explosion Device )
- Mortar 81mm 81 KRH 71 Y both firing and producing guided-launched antipersonnel improvised charges

== Modern successors of the Sissi troops ==
Following a doctrine developmental decline that began in the 1990s, sissi activities began to disappear from Finnish Defence Forces (FDF) doctrine in the early 2000s , with the last sissi company was first renamed to a reconnaissance company in 2015 and disbanded completely in 2016.

At the same time, the FDF's reformed land warfare doctrine is a distributed fighting doctrine which requires every soldier in the army to understand basic principles of asymmetric warfare tactics. The Finnish Defence Forces continues to provide reconnaissance (formerly sissi) training in many major training formations, where they emphasize reconnaissance, forward observation and fire control but this training no longer leans towards special tactics, weapons, sabotage and woodland area fighting skills.

However, the Finnish Defence Forces paratroopers of the Utti Jaeger Regiment are trained in woodland area fighting, survival skills, unconventional methods and asymmetric warfare tactics though the major role is geared more towards special reconnaissance and special warfare operations.

The Finnish Border Guard, under the ministry of interior, has renamed its Sissi companies to Border Jaeger companies and has adopted the term (Special) Border Jaeger as a replacement for the term Sissi. These units are trained to operate behind the enemy lines with asymmetric tactics and unconventional weapons and methods as well as to conduct long term operational reconnaissance and aggressive short term reconnaissance and sabotage. Aside from classical Sissi training, the training also includes peacetime operational methods and the responsibilities of the Border Guard i.e. border control, patrol, and tracking and catching illegal intruders.

== See also ==
- Artillery Brigade (Finnish Army)
- Commando
- Long Range Reconnaissance Patrol
