= Planet Fun =

Planet Fun may refer to:

- Planet Fun, a traveling fun fair at Carrickfergus Castle, Northern Ireland that had a malfunctioning ride, see Incidents at European amusement parks
- Planet Fun, a television channel in Pakistan, run by Mimyuni Media Entertainment
- Planet Fun, a distributor in New Zealand for the Thunderbirds Are Go merchandise
- Planet Fun, a former moniker for KXBS
- "Planet Fun", a song from the episode "Fly Us to the Moon" on the show Wow! Wow! Wubbzy!

== See also ==
- Planet FunFun, a former indoor amusement park located in Kerava, Finland
- Planet Funk, Italian electronic band
