= Commando =

Elite light infantry combatant

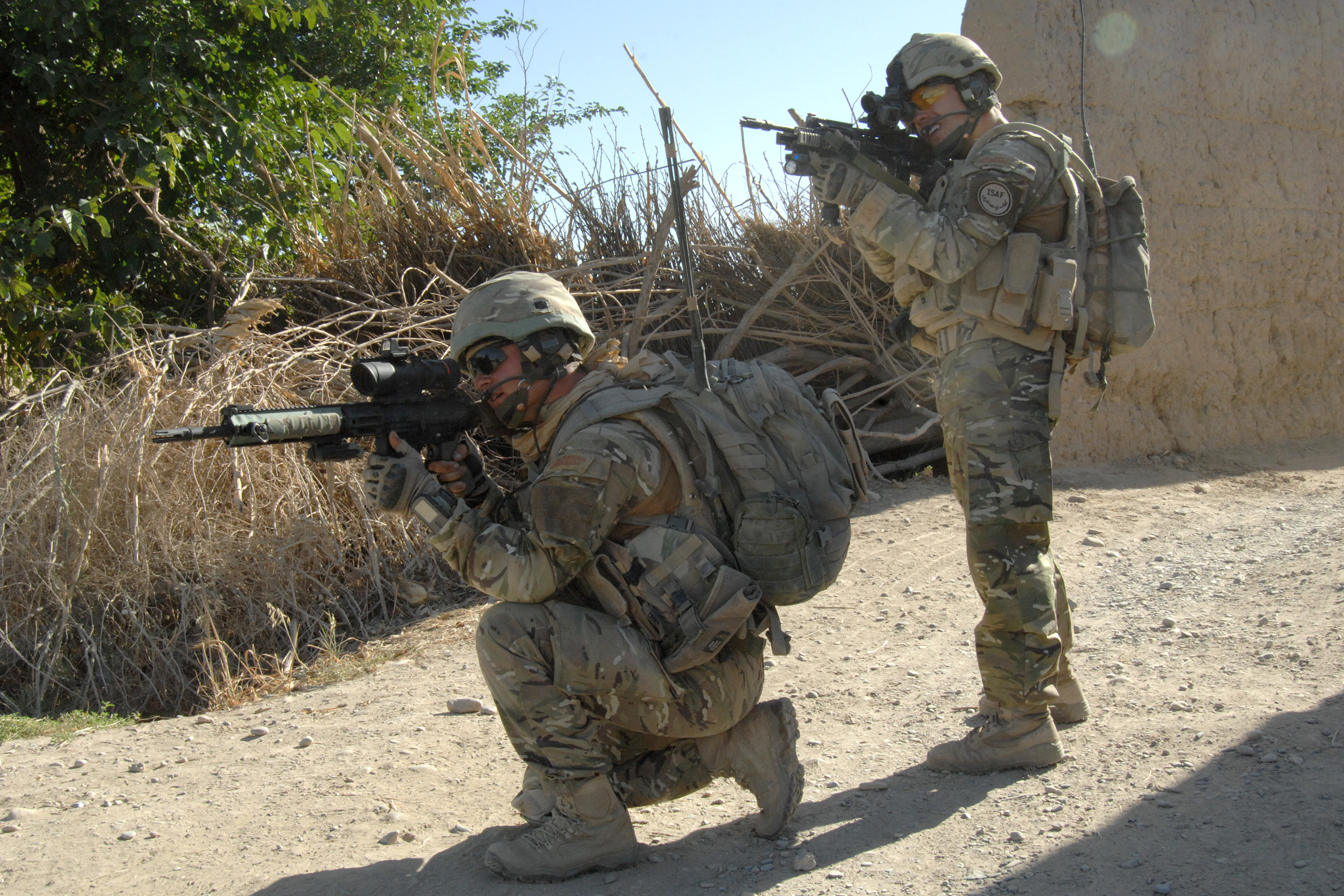
Royal Marines from 40 Commando on patrol in the Sangin area of Afghanistan are pictured

A commando is a soldier of an elite light infantry or special operations force, trained to carry out raids and work in small teams behind enemy lines. The word can also mean a unit of such soldiers. It comes from the Afrikaans kommando, meaning a Boer militia unit, and was adopted for British raiding units during the Second World War.

Commando units usually have demanding selection processes. Candidates are tested for physical fitness, mental resilience and motivation, and selection methods vary widely between units and countries.

Since the Second World War, commandos have been set apart by their tough training, which is often marked by the award of a green beret. The green beret began with the British Commandos, who helped found or train many other units, including the US Rangers and the Dutch Korps Commandotroepen. Today the term is used for special forces in many countries.

== Etymology ==
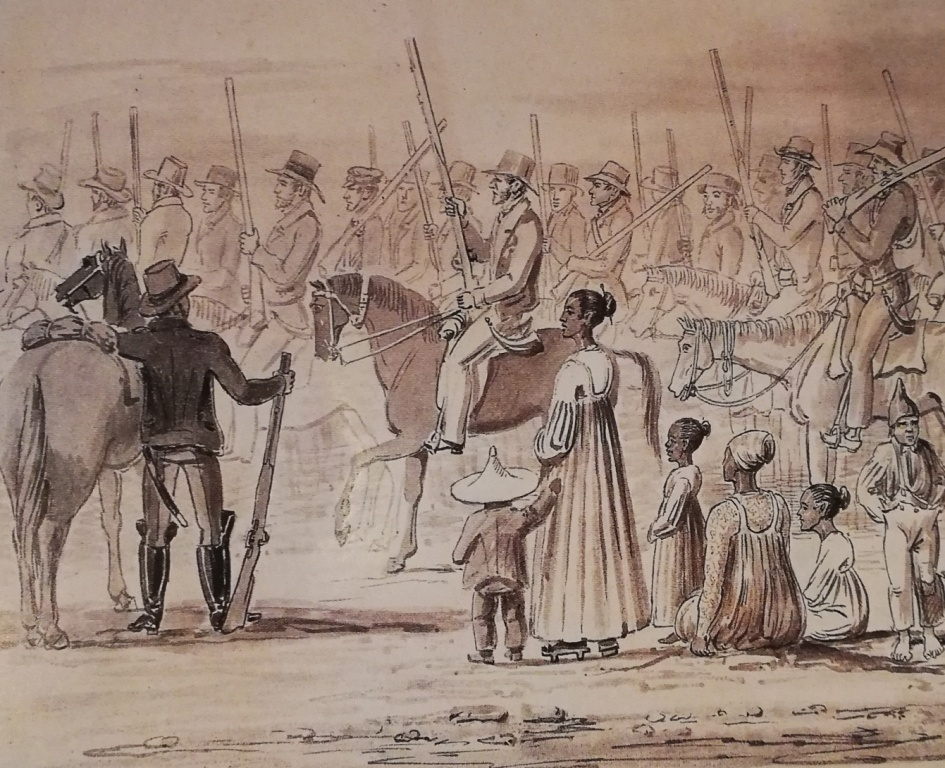
Cape Mounted Burghers, or "kommando," assembling for action in 1846 during the Seventh Xhosa War. The term originally referred to the mounted infantry of this type.

The term commando derives from the Latin word commendare ("to recommend") via the Dutch word kommando, which translates as "a command or order" and or roughly to "mobile infantry unit". Kommando in turn originated from the Portuguese word comando, which was used in Portuguese India to refer to an early type of special forces. Kommando was adopted into Afrikaans from Boer interactions with the Portuguese in neighboring African colonies. In Southern Africa, the term originally referred to units of locally raised mounted infantry which fought during the Xhosa Wars, Anglo-Zulu War and the First and Second Boer Wars. The British were exposed to the concept during the 19th and 20th centuries, in particular during the Boer Wars. During World War II, the British military established the Commandos, a special forces formation that conducted raids against German-occupied Europe. Wehrmacht special forces units were also referred to as "kommandos". Some historians have argued the term is a High German loan word originating from German colonists who settled in the Dutch Cape Colony.

The Oxford English Dictionary ties the English use of the word meaning "[a] member of a body of picked men ..." directly into its Afrikaans origins:

1943 Combined Operations (Min. of Information) i. Lt. Lieutenant-Colonel D. W. Clarke... produced the outline of a scheme.... The men for this type of irregular warfare should, he suggested, be formed into units to be known as Commandos.... Nor was the historical parallel far-fetched. After the victories of Roberts and Kitchener had scattered the Boer army, the guerrilla tactics of its individual units (which were styled 'Commandos')... prevented decisive victory.... His [sc. Lt.-Col. D. W. Clarke's] ideas were accepted; so also, with some hesitation, was the name Commando.

During World War II, newspaper reports of the deeds of "the commandos" only in the plural led to readers thinking that the singular meant one man rather than one military unit, and this new usage became established.

Originally, "a commando" was a type of combat unit, as opposed to an individual in that unit, although the term today can be used in both senses and also to refer to guerrilla warfare carried out by small units. In English, to distinguish between an individual commando and a commando unit, the unit is occasionally capitalized. In China, the term does not necessarily refer to a military unit as country's People's Armed Police also has commando units such as the Snow Leopards and Falcons.

The term "para-commando" may be used to combine the roles of paratrooper and commando.

== Selection ==
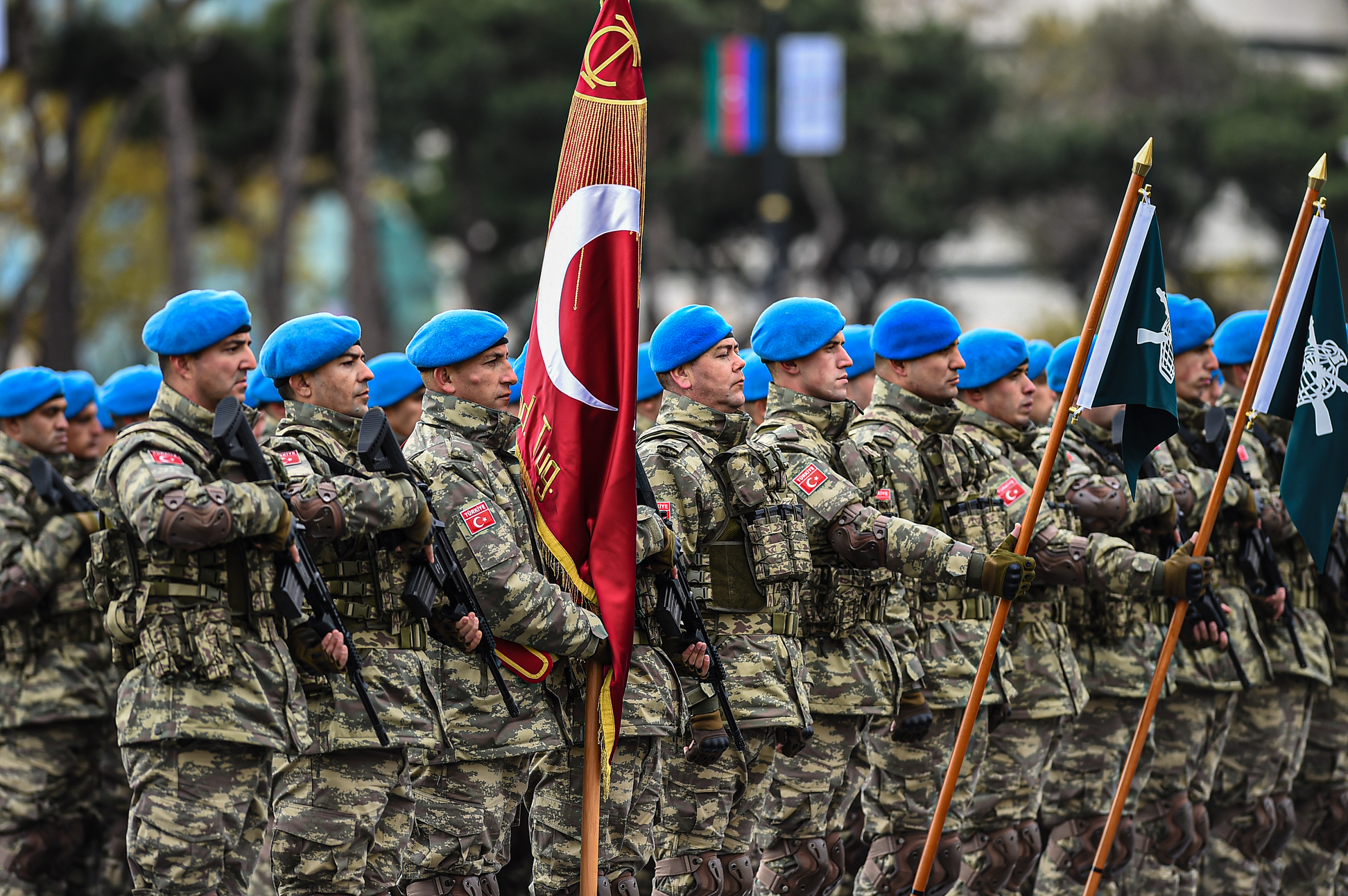
Turkish Land Forces commando units with their distinctive blue berets

Due to the special mental and physiological requirements imposed on applicants, there are restrictions on entry into "commando" units. Applicants have to fulfill special requirements. Selecting applicants with the highest motivation, modern special forces run special selection processes.

Historically, there is evidence of selection for the Otdelnly Gwardieskij Batalion Minerow, predecessors of the modern Russian spetsnaz. Soldiers had to be younger than 30 years, were mostly athletes or hunters, and had to show the highest motivation. During training and selection, some participants died since they were exhausted and left to their own devices.

The German Kommando Spezialkräfte (KSK) demands high levels of physical resilience, teamwork, willingness to learn, mental resilience, willpower, sense of responsibility, flexibility, secrecy, and adaptability from its applicants. These skills are proven during the assessment.

The fitness test of the U.S. Navy SEALs tests swimming speed over 500 yards, number of push-ups and sit-ups within 2 minutes, pull-ups, and running 1.5 miles.

Long Range Desert Group hired its personnel after a lengthy interrogation. First, SAS members had to complete a 50km march, and the Royal Marine commandos tested their applicants' motivation during an obstacle course that included real explosives and machine-gun fire near Achnacarry in Scotland. The French Foreign Legion assesses their applicants through medical, intelligence, logic, and fitness tests as well as interrogations, small drills, and solving small tasks.

== Boer name origin and adoption by Britain ==
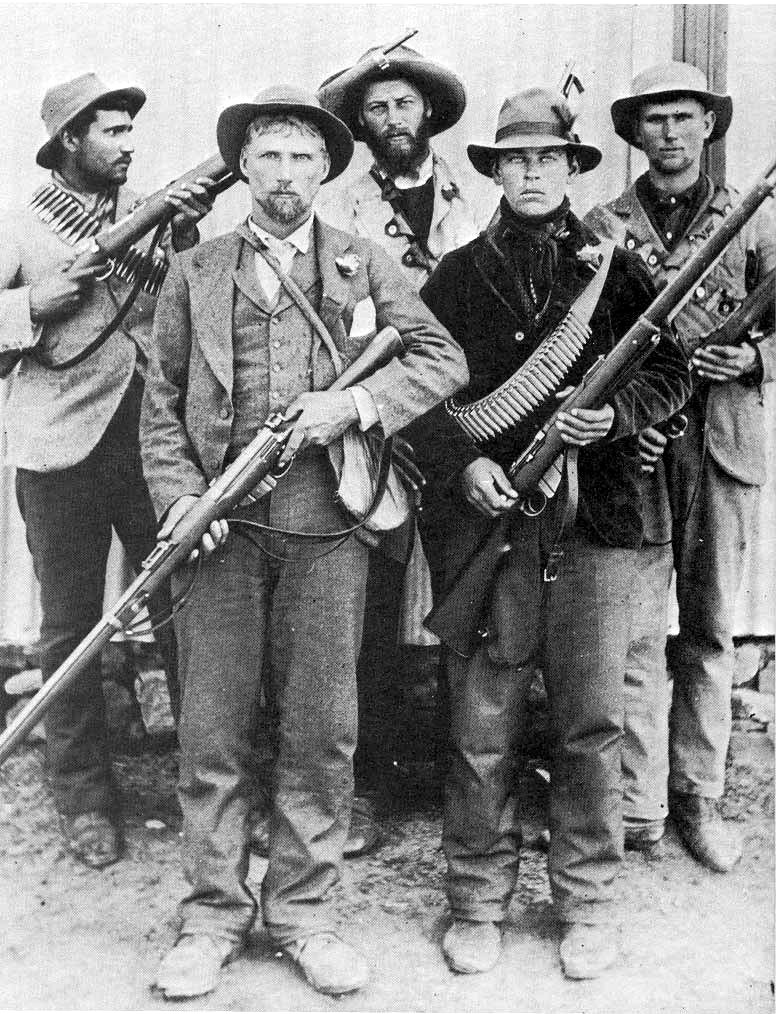
The first appearance and use of the term "commando" was taken from the Afrikaner guerilla units known as "Kommandos" in South Africa during the Second Boer War of 1899–1902

After the Dutch Cape Colony was established in 1652, the word was used to describe militia bands. The first "Commando Law" was instated by the original Dutch East India Company chartered settlements, and similar laws were maintained through the independent Boer Orange Free State and South African Republic. The law compelled burghers to equip themselves with horses and firearms when required in defense. The implementation of these laws was called the "Commando System". A group of mounted militiamen was organized in a unit known as a commando and headed by a commandant, who was normally elected from inside the unit. Men called up to serve were said to be "on commando". British experience with this system led to the widespread adoption of the word "commandeer" into English in the 1880s.

During the Great Trek, conflicts with Southern African peoples such as the Xhosa and the Zulu caused the Boers to retain the commando system despite being free of colonial laws. Also, the word came to be used to describe any armed raid. During this period, the Boers also developed guerrilla techniques for use against numerically superior but less mobile native bands, such as the Zulu, who fought in large, complex formations.

In the First Boer War, Boer commandos utilised superior marksmanship, fieldcraft, camouflage, and mobility to great effect against British forces, who wore conspicuous red uniforms and were poorly trained in marksmanship. These tactics continued to be used during the Second Boer War. In the final phase of the war, 25,000 Boer commandos engaged in asymmetric warfare against British Imperial forces numbering 450,000 strong for two years after the British had captured the capitals of the two Boer republics. During these conflicts, the word entered the English language, retaining its general Afrikaans meaning of a "militia unit" or a "raid". Robert Baden-Powell recognised the importance of fieldcraft and was inspired to form the scouting movement.

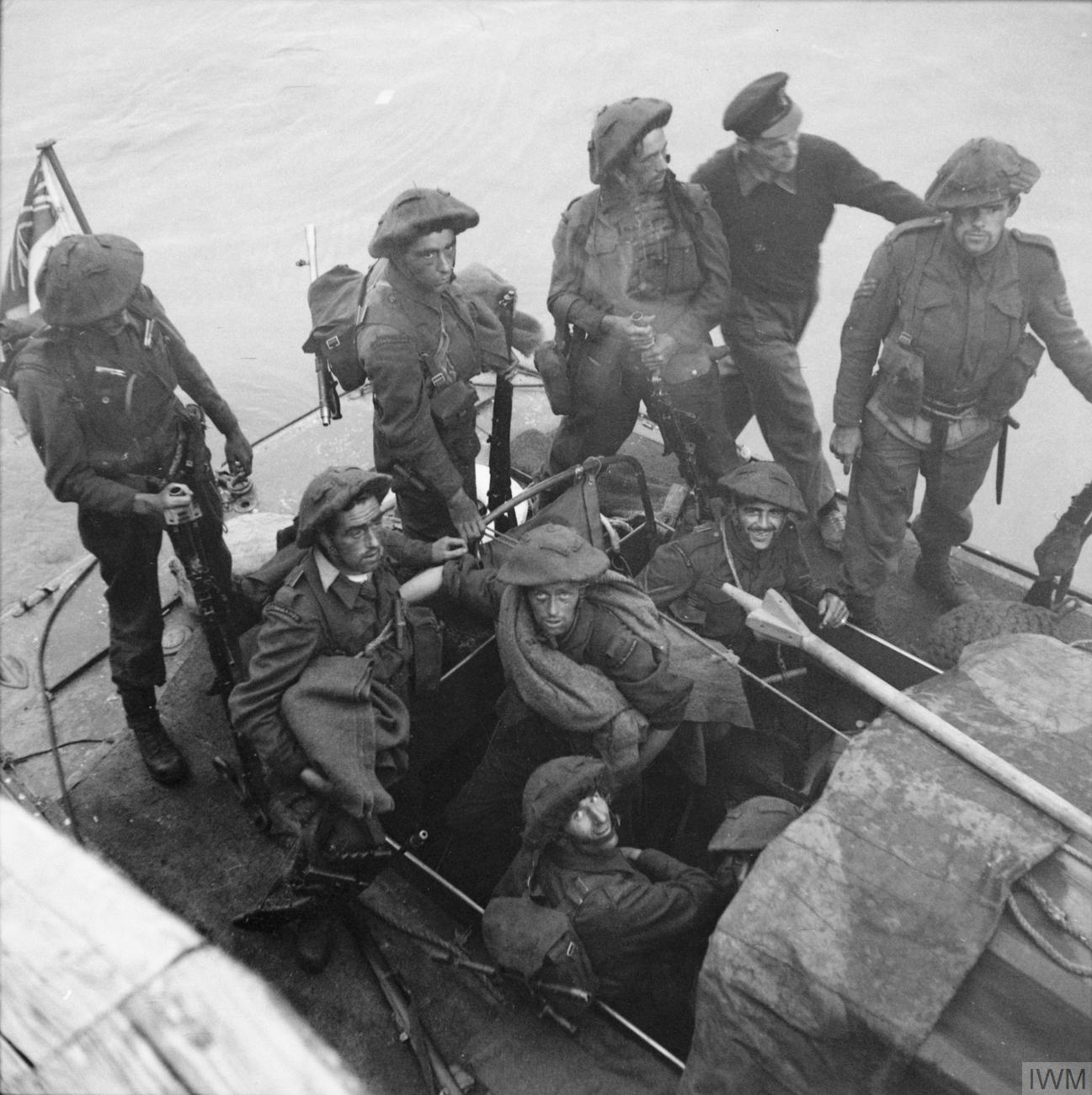
The "commando" name was permanently established with the introduction of the British Commandos in 1942 the elite special forces units of the British Army in World War II

In 1941, Lieutenant-Colonel D. W. Clarke of the British Imperial General Staff, suggested the name commando for specialized raiding units of the British Army Special Service in evocation of the effectiveness and tactics of the Boer commandos. During World War II, American and British publications, confused over the use of the plural "commandos" for that type of British military units, gave rise to the modern common habit of using "a commando" to mean one member of such a unit, or one man engaged on a raiding-type operation.

== Green berets and training ==
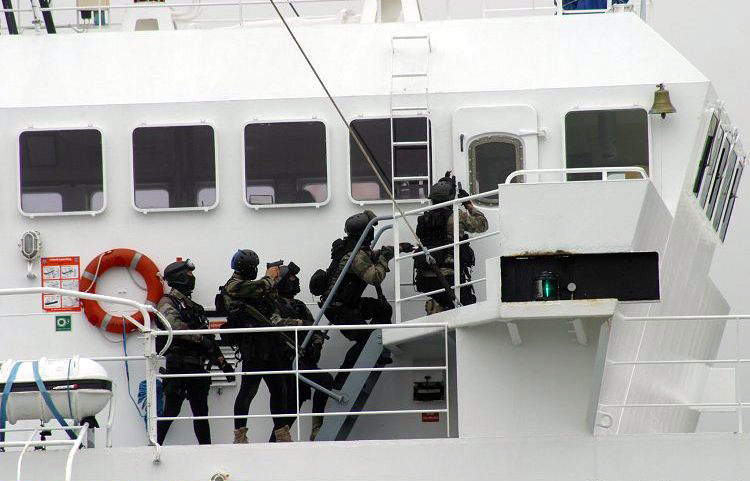
The French Navy commando unit Jaubert storms a naval vessel in a training assault

Since the 20th century and World War II in particular, commandos have been set apart from other military units by virtue of their extreme training regimes; these are usually associated with the awarding of green berets which originated with British Commandos. The British Commandos were instrumental in founding many other international commando units during World War II. Some international commando units were formed from members who served as part of or alongside British Commandos, such as the Dutch Korps Commandotroepen (who still wear the recognition flash insignia of the British Fairbairn–Sykes fighting knife), the Belgian 5th Special Air Service, or Greek Sacred Band. In 1944, the SAS Brigade was formed from the British 1st and 2nd SAS, the French 3rd and 4th SAS, and the Belgian 5th SAS. The French Army special forces (1er RPIMa) still use the motto Qui Ose Gagne, a translation of the SAS motto "Who Dares Wins".

In addition, many Commonwealth nations were part of the original British Commando units. They developed their own national traditions, including the Australian Special Air Service Regiment, the New Zealand Special Air Service, and the Rhodesian Special Air Service, all of which share (or used to) the same insignia and motto as their British counterparts. During the Second World War, the British SAS quickly adopted sand-coloured berets, since they were based almost entirely in the North African theatre; they used these rather than green berets to distinguish themselves from other British Commando units. (See History of the Special Air Service). Other Commonwealth commando units were formed after the Second World War, directly based on the British Commando units, such as the Australian Army Reserve 1st Commando Regiment (Australia), distinct from the Regular Army 2nd Commando Regiment (Australia), which originated from the 4th Battalion, Royal Australian Regiment in 1997.

The US Rangers were founded by Major General Lucian Truscott of the US Army, a liaison officer with the British General Staff. In 1942, he submitted a proposal to General George Marshall to establish an American unit "along the lines of the British Commandos". The original US Rangers trained at the British Commandos centre at Achnacarry Castle. The US Navy SEALs' original formation, the Observer Group, was also trained and influenced by British Commandos. The US Special Forces originated with the First Special Service Force, formed under British Combined Operations. The First Special Service Force was a joint American-Canadian unit, and modern Canadian special operations forces also trace their lineage to this unit and, through it, to British Commandos, despite having existed in their modern incarnation only since 2006.

Malaysian green beret special forces PASKAL and Grup Gerak Khas (who still wear the Blue Lanyard of the Royal Marines) were originally trained by British Commandos. The Portuguese Marine Corps Fuzileiros were originally trained by British Commandos in 1961. Other British units, such as the SAS, led to the development of many international special operations units that are now typically referred to as commandos, including the Bangladeshi Para-Commando Brigade, Pakistani Special Services Group, the Indian MARCOS, Jordanian Special Operation Forces and Philippine National Police Special Action Force.

A Dutch study found that a sample of Dutch male special forces operators was more emotionally stable and conscientious, but also more closed-minded than matched civilian controls and other types of soldiers.

== World War I ==
=== Austro-Hungarian assault units ===
During the winter of 1914–1915, large parts of the Eastern Front switched to trench warfare. To cope with the new situation, many Austro-Hungarian regiments spontaneously formed infantry squads called Jagdkommandos. These squads were named after the specially trained forces of the Russian army formed in 1886, which were used to protect against ambushes, conduct reconnaissance, and engage in low-intensity fighting in no-man's-land.

The Austro-Hungarian High Army command (Armeeoberkommando, AOK) realized the need for special forces and decided to draw on German experience. Starting in September–October 1916, about 120 officers and 300 NCOs were trained at the German training area in Beuville (near the village of Doncourt) to serve as the main cadre of the newly raised Austro-Hungarian army assault battalions. The former Jagdkommandos were incorporated into these battalions.

=== Italy ===
The first country to establish commando troops was Italy, in the summer of 1917, shortly before Germany.

Italy used specialist trench-raiding teams to break the stalemate of static fighting against Austria-Hungary, in the Alpine battles of World War I. These teams were called "Arditi" (meaning "daring, brave ones"); they were almost always men under 25 in top physical condition and, possibly at first, bachelors (due to fear of very high casualty rates). Actually, the Arditi (who were led to the lines just a few hours before the assault, having been familiarised with the terrain via photo-reconnaissance and trained on trench systems re-created ad hoc for them) suffered fewer casualties than regular line infantry and were highly successful in their tasks. Many volunteered for extreme-right formations in the turbulent years after the war and (the Fascist Party took pride in this and adopted the style and the mannerism of Arditi), but some of left-wing political persuasions created the "Arditi del Popolo" (People's Arditi) and for some years held the fascist raids in check, defending Socialist and Communist Party sections, buildings, rallies and meeting places.

== World War II ==
=== Australia ===
The Australian Army formed commando units, known as Australian independent companies in the early stages of World War II. They first saw action in early 1942 during the Japanese assault on New Ireland, and in the Battle of Timor. Part of the 2/1st Independent Company was wiped out on New Ireland, but on Timor, the 2/2nd Independent Company formed the heart of an Allied force that engaged Japanese forces in a guerrilla campaign. The Japanese commander on the island drew parallels to the Boer War and concluded that a 10:1 numerical advantage would be required to defeat the Allies. The campaign occupied the attention of an entire Japanese division for almost a year. The independent companies were later renamed commando squadrons, and they saw widespread action in the South West Pacific Area, especially in New Guinea and Borneo. In 1943, all the commando squadrons except the 2/2nd and 2/8th were grouped into the 2/6th, 2/7th, and 2/9th Cavalry Commando Regiments.

Later in the war, the Royal Australian Navy also formed commando units along the lines of the Royal Naval Commandos to go ashore with the first waves of major amphibious assaults, to signpost the beaches and carry out other naval tasks. These were known as RAN Commandos. Four were formed—lettered A, B, C, and D like their British counterparts—and they took part in the Borneo campaign.

Z Force, an Australian-British-New Zealand military intelligence commando unit, formed by the Australian Services Reconnaissance Department, also carried out many raiding and reconnaissance operations in the South West Pacific theatre, most notably Operation Jaywick, in which they destroyed tonnes of Japanese shipping at Singapore Harbour. An attempt to replicate this success, with Operation Rimau, resulted in the death of almost all those involved. However, Z Force and other SRD units continued operations until the war's end.

=== Canada ===
A joint Canadian-American Commando unit, the 1st Special Service Force, nicknamed the Devil's Brigade, was formed in 1942 under the command of Colonel Robert Frederick. The unit initially saw service in the Pacific, in August 1943 at Kiska in the Aleutians campaign. However, most of its operations occurred during the Italian campaign and in southern France. Its most famous raid, which was documented in the film Devil's Brigade, was the battle of Monte la Difensa. In 1945, the unit was disbanded; some of the Canadian members were sent to the 1st Canadian Parachute Battalion as replacements, and the American members were sent to either the 101st Airborne Division or the 82nd Airborne Division as replacements or the 474th Regimental Combat Team. Ironically, they were sent to serve in Norway in 1945, the country they were formed to raid.

=== Finland ===
The Finns fielded the Erillinen Pataljoona 4, and about 150 men were trained before the beginning of summer 1941. At first, the units had as few as 15 men, but during the war this was increased to 60. On July 1, 1943, the units were organised in the 4th Detached Battalion. In 1944, a special unit equipped with amphibious He 115 aircraft was formed to support the battalion. The total strength of the battalion was 678 men and 76 women (see Lotta Svärd).

In the Battle of Ilomantsi, soldiers of the 4th disrupted the supply lines of the Soviet artillery, preventing effective fire support. The battalion made over 50 missions in 1943 and just under 100 in 1944, and was disbanded on November 30 of that same year.

Sissiosasto/5.D is another Finnish Commando unit of the World War Two era. The Detachment was founded on August 20, 1941, under the Lynx Division (5th Division, Finnish VI Corps). It was a self-contained unit for reconnaissance patrolling, sabotage, and guerrilla warfare operations behind enemy lines.

=== Germany ===
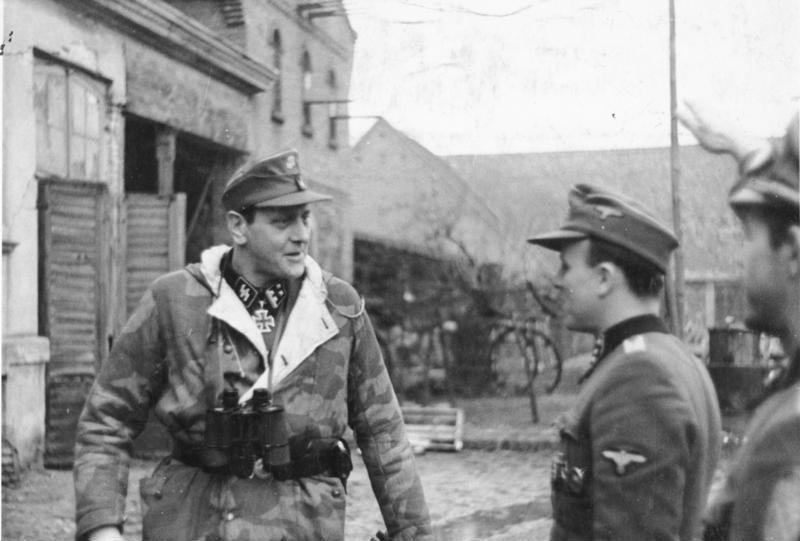
Skorzeny with soldiers of the 500th SS Parachute Battalion (1945)

In December 1939, following the success of German infiltration and sabotage operations in the Polish campaign, the German Office for Foreign and Counter-Intelligence (OKW Amt Ausland/Abwehr) formed the Brandenburger Regiment (known officially as the 800th Special Purpose Training and Construction Company). The Brandenburgers conducted a mixture of covert and conventional operations but became increasingly involved in ordinary infantry actions and were eventually converted into a Panzer-Grenadier Division, suffering heavy losses in Russia. Otto Skorzeny (most famed for his rescue of Benito Mussolini) conducted many special operations for Adolf Hitler. Skorzeny commanded Sonderlehrgang z.b.V. Oranienburg, Sonderverband z.b.V. Friedenthal, and SS-Jäger-Bataillon 502, 500th SS Parachute Battalion, SS-Jagdverband Mitte and all other SS commando units.

The German Fallschirmjäger were famous for their elite skills and their use in rapid commando-style raids and as elite "fire brigade" infantrymen. Fort Eben-Emael on the Belgian border was captured in 1940 by Fallschirmjäger troops as part of the German invasion and occupation of Belgium.

A report written by Major-General Robert Laycock in 1947 claimed that there was a German raid on a radar station on the Isle of Wight in 1941.

=== Greece ===
The Sacred band (Greek: Ιερός Λόχος) was a Greek special forces unit formed in 1942 in the Middle East, composed entirely of Greek officers and officer cadets under the command of Col. Christodoulos Tsigantes. It fought alongside the SAS in the Libyan Desert and with the SBS in the Aegean, as well as with General Leclerc's Free French Forces in Tunisia. It was disbanded in August 1945.

=== Italy ===
Italy's most renowned commando unit of World War II was Decima Flottiglia MAS ("10th Assault Vehicle Flotilla"), which, from mid-1940, sank or damaged a considerable tonnage of Allied ships in the Mediterranean.

After Italy surrendered in 1943, some of the Decima Flottiglia MAS were on the Allied side of the battle line and fought with the Allies, renaming themselves the Mariassalto. The others fought on the German side and kept their original name but did not operate at sea after 1943, being mostly employed against Italian partisans; some of its men were involved in atrocities against civilians.

In post-war years, the Italian marine commandos were reorganised as the "Comsubin" (an abbreviation of Comando Subacqueo Incursori, or Underwater Raiders Command). They wear the green Commando beret.

=== Japan ===
In 1944–45, Japanese Teishin Shudan ("Raiding Group") and Giretsu ("heroic") detachments made airborne assaults on Allied airfields in the Philippines, Marianas and Okinawa. The attacking forces varied in size from a few paratroopers to several companies. Due to the balance of forces involved, these raids caused little damage or casualties and destroyed the Japanese units involved. Considering that there were no plans to extract these forces, and the reluctance to surrender by Japanese personnel during that era, they are often seen in the same light as kamikaze pilots of 1944–45.

Nakano School trained intelligence and commando officers and organized commando teams for sabotage and guerrilla warfare.

The navy had commando units "S-toku" (Submarine special attack units, see Kure 101st JSNLF(in Japanese) ) for infiltrating enemy areas by submarine. It was called the Japanese Special Naval Landing Forces of Kure 101st, Sasebo 101st and 102nd.

=== New Zealand ===
New Zealand formed the Southern Independent Commando in Fiji 1942.

=== Poland ===
Cichociemni (Polish pronunciation: [t͡ɕixɔˈt͡ɕɛmɲi]; the "Silent Unseen") were elite special-operations paratroopers of the Polish Army in exile, created in Great Britain during World War II to operate in occupied Poland (Cichociemni Spadochroniarze Armii Krajowej).

=== Soviet Union ===
Voyennaya Razvyedka (Razvedchiki Scouts) are "Military intelligence" personnel/units within larger formations in ground troops, airborne troops, and marines. Intelligence battalion in the division, reconnaissance company in the brigade, a reconnaissance platoon in the regiment.

Soviet Naval Frogmen The legendary Soviet Naval Scout Viktor Leonov commanded an elite unit of naval Commandos. The 4th Special Volunteer Detachment was a unit of 70 veterans. Initially they were confined to performing small scale reconnaissance missions, platoon sized insertions by sea and on occasion on land into Finland and later Norway. Later they were renamed the 181st Special Reconnaissance Detachment. They began conducting sabotage missions and raids to snatch prisoners for interrogation. They would also destroy German ammunition and supply depots, communication centers, and harass enemy troop concentrations along the Finnish and Russian coasts. After the European conflict ended, Leonov and his men were sent to the Pacific theatre to conduct operations against the Japanese.

=== United Kingdom ===
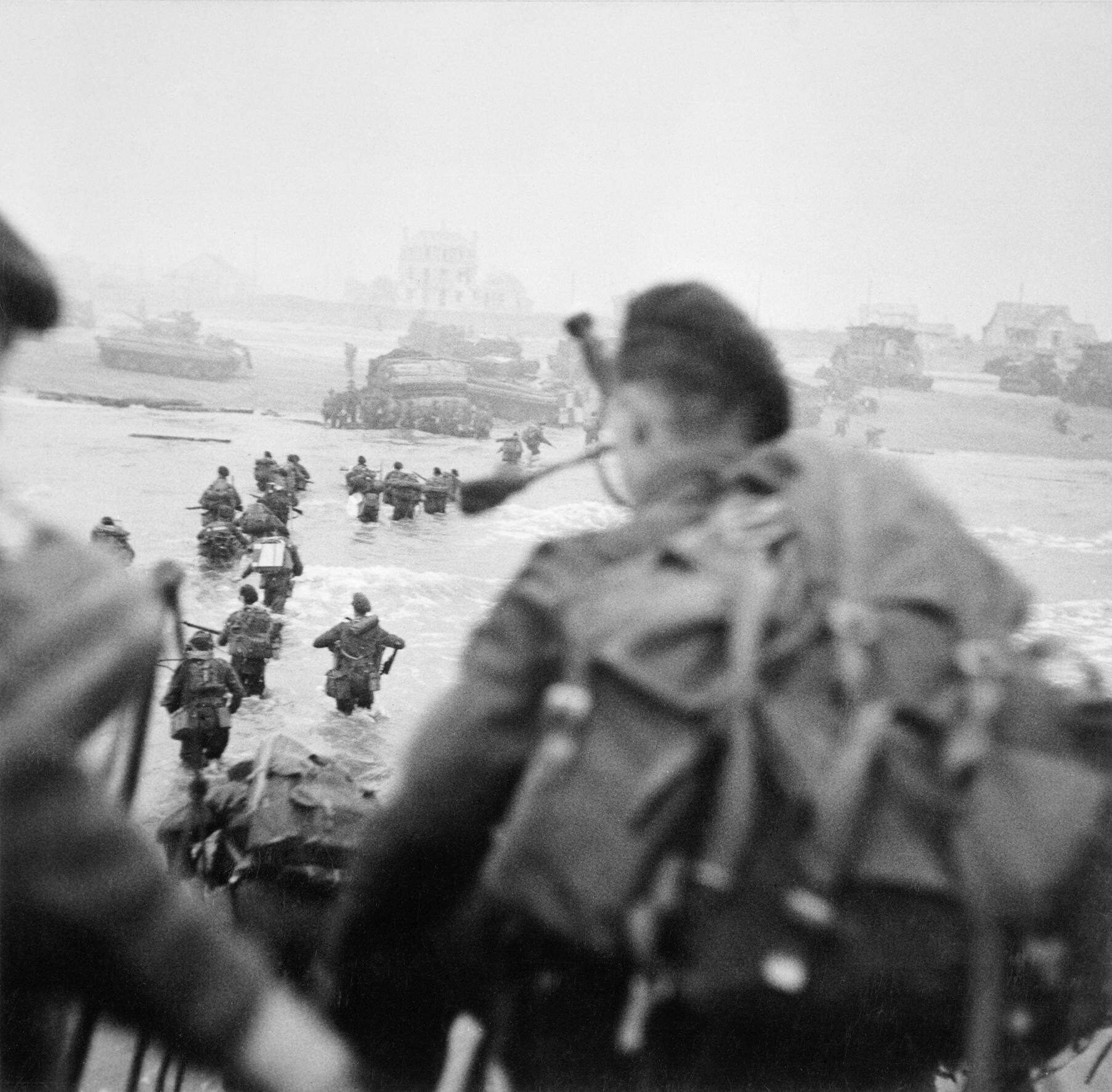
British Commandos wearing the green beret and carrying the Bergen rucksack during the Normandy landings, June 1944.

In 1940, the British Army formed "independent companies", later reformed as battalion sized "commandos", thereby reviving the word. The British intended that their commandos be small, highly mobile, surprise raiding and military reconnaissance forces. They intended them to carry all they needed and not remain in field operations for more than 36 hours. Army Commandos were all volunteers selected from existing soldiers still in Britain.

During the war, the British Army Commandos spawned several other famous British units, including the Special Air Service, the Special Boat Service, and the Parachute Regiment. The British Army Commandos themselves were never regimented and were disbanded at the end of the war.

The Special Operations Executive (SOE) also formed commando units from British and displaced European personnel (e.g., Cichociemni) to conduct raiding operations in occupied Europe. They also worked in small teams, such as the SAS, which consisted of 10 or fewer commandos, because that was better suited to special operations. One example is Norwegian Independent Company 1, which destroyed heavy water facilities in Norway in 1941.

The Royal Navy also controlled Royal Navy Beach Parties, based on teams formed to control the evacuation of Dunkirk in 1940. These were later known simply as RN Commandos. They did not see action until they successfully fought for control of the landing beaches (as in the disastrous Dieppe Raid of 19 August 1942). The RN Commandos, including Commando "W" from the Royal Canadian Navy, saw action on D-Day.

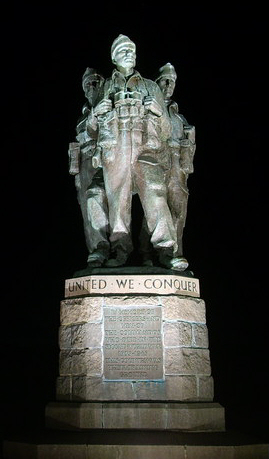
The Commando Memorial unveiled in 1952 in Scotland is dedicated to the British Commandos of the Second World War.

In 1942, the Royal Navy's nine Royal Marines infantry battalions were reorganized as Commandos, numbered 40 to 48, and joined the British Army Commandos in combined Commando Brigades. After the war, the Army Commandos were disbanded. The Royal Marines form an enduring Brigade-strength capability as 3 Commando Brigade with supporting Army units.

The Royal Air Force also formed 15 commando units in 1942, each of which was 150 strong. These units consisted of trained technicians, armourers, and maintainers who had volunteered to undertake the commando course. These Royal Air Force Commandos accompanied the Allied invasion forces in all theatres; their main role was to allow the forward operation of friendly fighters by servicing and arming them from captured airfields. However, due to the forward position of these airfields, the RAF Commandos were also trained to secure and make them safe and to help defend them against enemy counterattacks.

=== United States ===
During 1941, the United States Marine Corps formed commando battalions. The USMC commandos were known collectively as Marine Raiders. Orders from President Franklin D. Roosevelt, through a proposal from OSS Director Colonel William J. Donovan and the former Commander of the United States Marine Detachment, Major Evans F Carlson, directed the formation of what became the Marine Raiders. Initially, this unit was to be called Marine Commandos and was to be the counterpart to the British Commandos. The name Marine Commandos met with much controversy within the Marine Corps leading Commandant Thomas J. Holcomb to state, "the term 'Marine' is sufficient to indicate a man ready for duty at any time, and the injection of a special name, such as commando, would be undesirable and superfluous." President Roosevelt's son, James Roosevelt, served with the Marine Raiders. The Raiders initially saw action at the Battle of Tulagi and the Battle of Makin, as well as the Battle of Guadalcanal, the Battle of Empress Augusta Bay, and other parts of the Pacific Ocean Areas. In February 1944, the four Raider battalions were converted to regular Marine units. Additionally, as parachuting special forces units, Paramarines arguably also qualified as commandos- though they too were assimilated into regular Marine units in 1944.

In mid-1942, the United States Army formed its Army Rangers in Northern Ireland under William O. (Bill) Darby. The Rangers were designed along lines similar to those of the British Commandos. The first sizable Ranger action took place in August 1942 at the Dieppe Raid, where 50 Rangers from the 1st Ranger Battalion were dispersed among Canadian regulars and British Commandos. The first full Ranger action took place in November 1942 during the invasion of Algiers in Northwest Africa as part of Operation Torch, again by members of the 1st Ranger Battalion.

== After 1945 ==
=== Israeli ===
The primary commando units of the Israel Defense Forces include Shayetet 13, Sayeret Matkal, and the Shaldag Unit, as well as the Oz Brigade (which contains the subordinate commando units Duvdevan Unit, Egoz Reconnaissance Unit, and Maglan).

Shayetet 13 is the elite naval commando unit of the Israeli Navy. S'13 specializes in sea-to-land incursions, counter-terrorism, sabotage, maritime intelligence gathering, maritime hostage rescue, and boarding. The unit is one of the world's most well-reputed special forces units.

Sayeret Matkal (General Staff Reconnaissance Unit) is a special forces unit of the Israel Defense Forces (IDF) directly subordinate to the Directorate of Military Intelligence. Primarily a field intelligence-gathering unit specializing in special reconnaissance behind enemy lines, Sayeret Matkal is also tasked with counter-terrorism, hostage rescue, and foreign espionage. Modeled after the British Army's Special Air Service—from which it emulated the motto, "Who Dares, Wins"—the unit is considered to be the Israeli equivalent to the Delta Force of the United States. As one of Israel's most important commando units, the Sayeret Matkal has reputedly been involved in almost every major counter-terrorism operation since its inception in 1957.

The Egoz Reconnaissance Unit is a special forces commando unit in the Israel Defense Forces (IDF). Egoz specializes in guerrilla and anti-guerrilla warfare, intelligence gathering behind enemy lines, and more complicated ground activity. Egoz is part of the Commando Brigade but still completes basic training with the Golani Brigade.

Maglan (also known as Unit 212) is an Israeli special forces unit that specializes in operating behind enemy lines and deep in enemy territory using advanced technologies and weaponry.

Unit 217, frequently called Duvdevan, is an elite special operations force within the Israel Defense Forces, part of the Oz Brigade. Duvdevan is noted for undercover operations in urban areas, during which they often wear Arab civilian clothes as a disguise.

Shaldag Unit, also known as Unit 5101, is an elite Israeli Air Force commando unit. Shaldag's mission is to deploy undetected into combat and hostile environments to conduct special reconnaissance, establish assault zones or airfields, while simultaneously conducting air traffic control and commando actions.

=== Philippines ===
The Special Action Force (SAF) is the elite commando unit of the Philippine National Police. SAF candidates are required to undergo the SAF Commando Course to be allowed to wear the SAF Beret. It also serves as the foundation course or requisite for other SAF specialization trainings such as Explosives and Ordnance Disposal (EOD), Basic Airborne Course (BAC), Urban Counter Revolutionary Warfare Course (SURESHOCK), SCUBA-BUSROC (Basic Under-Water Search and Rescue Operations Course), SAF Seaborne Warfare Course (SSWC), and others.

=== Turkey ===
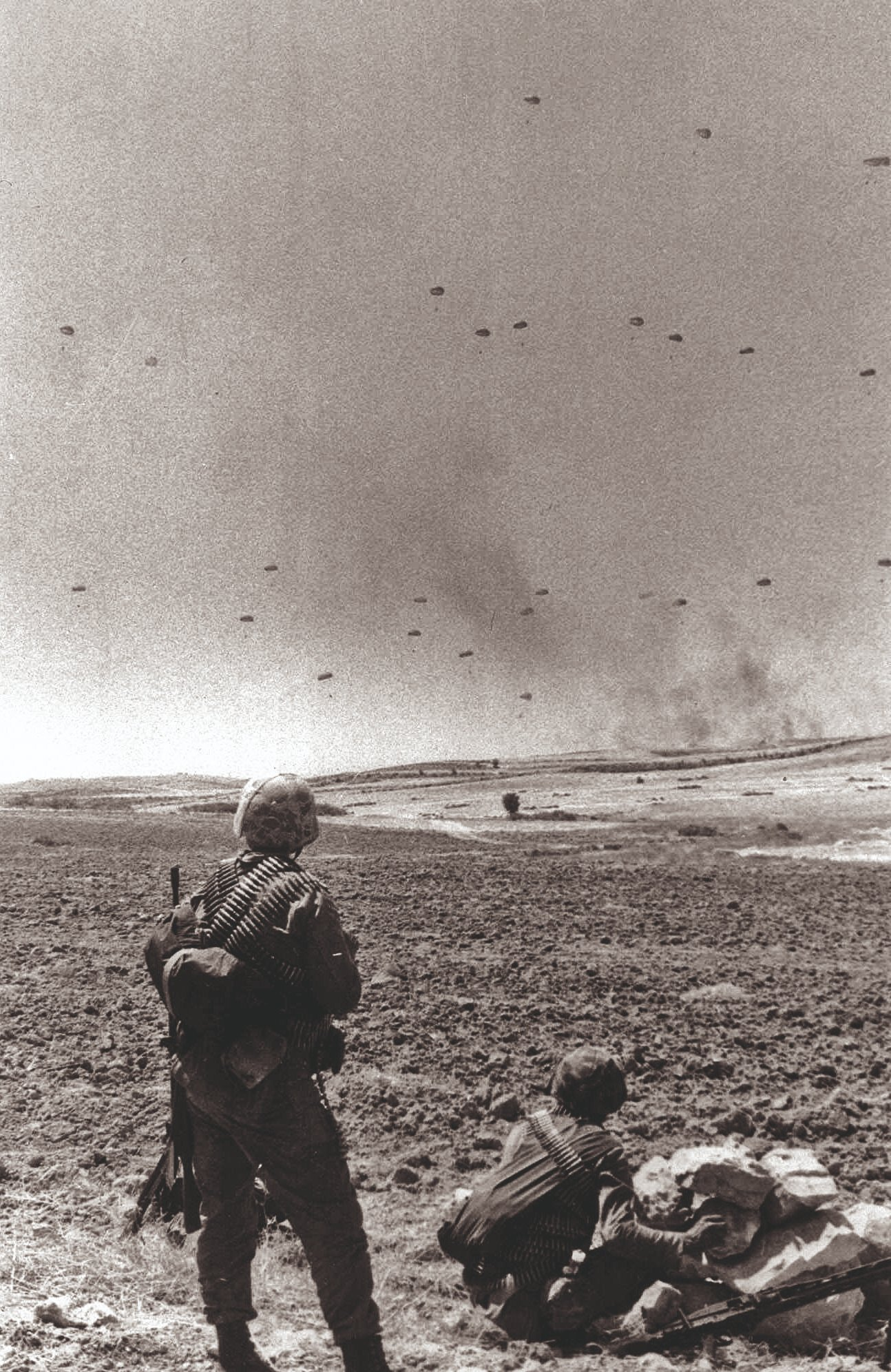
Turkish paratrooper commandos in Cyprus War

In 1963, the 1st Commando Brigade of Turkish Land Forces was officially established in Kayseri, marking the formal beginning of Turkey’s modern commando forces. Initially structured to handle high-altitude and unconventional warfare, these units quickly gained prominence within the Turkish Armed Forces. By the 1970s, the commandos had already demonstrated their operational value, most notably during the 1974 Cyprus War, where they executed airborne and amphibious landings under combat conditions.

Throughout the 1980s and 1990s, as the insurgency led by the PKK escalated, Turkish Army Commandos were heavily deployed in southeastern Turkey and northern Iraq. This period saw the expansion of commando units, including the formation of mountain and special operations brigades specifically trained for counter-terrorism, high-mobility engagements, and night operations in rugged terrain.

In the 2000s and 2010s, Turkish commandos participated in several cross-border military campaigns, including Operation Sun (2008), and later, Operation Euphrates Shield (2016), Operation Olive Branch (2018), and Operation Peace Spring (2019) in Syria. These missions aimed to secure Turkey’s borders, eliminate terrorist threats, and establish safe zones. The role of the commandos in these operations often involved spearheading assaults, securing urban areas, and conducting joint missions with armored and air support units.

=== United Kingdom ===
The United Kingdom Commando Force, Royal Marines is under the command of the Royal Navy's Commander-in-Chief Fleet. All Royal Marines (other than those in the Royal Marines Band Service) are commando trained on entry to the Corps, with supporting units and individuals from the other armed services undertaking the All Arms Commando Course as required.

The brigade is made up of 30 (IX) Commando, 40 Commando (home base: Taunton), 42 Commando (Bickleigh, South Hams, Plymouth), 43 Commando Fleet Protection Group (HMNB Clyde, Argyll and Bute), 45 Commando (Arbroath, Scotland), the Commando Logistic Regiment, the Royal Marines Armoured Support Group (Bovington Camp (Royal Armoured Corps Centre), Dorset), 539 Assault Squadron RM, 29 Commando Regiment Royal Artillery and 24 Commando Regiment Royal Engineers.

The Royal Marines are the largest force of its type in Europe and the second largest in NATO.

=== United States ===
The United States continues to have no designated "commando" units; however, the closest equivalents remain the U.S. Army's 75th Ranger Regiment and United States Marine Corps Reconnaissance Battalions, which specialize in most of the same tasks and missions.

During the Vietnam War, the U.S. Army's 5th Special Forces Group (Airborne) instituted "Special Operations Augmentation Recondo School," an acronym for Reconnaissance Commando. The school was at Nha Trang Air Base, north of the massive U.S. Navy and Air Force Base at Cam Ranh Bay. Recondo School trained small, heavily armed long-range reconnaissance teams in the art of patrolling deep in enemy-held territory. All students were combat veterans and came from the ranks of the U.S. Army, U.S. Marine Corps Force Recon Battalions, and the Army of the Republic of South Korea. The Army of the Republic of Vietnam had its own school. The modern U.S. Army's dismounted reconnaissance troops and former long-range surveillance (LRS) teams, and Marine Corps Reconnaissance Battalions (Division Recon) and Force Reconnaissance (Force Recon) all derive some portion of their legacies from the Recondo program and utilize the name "Recondos" informally.

== See also ==
- Going commando
- Gurkha
- List of commando units
- Long-range reconnaissance patrol
- Recondo School
- Special Forces Command (Turkey)
- United States Army Reconnaissance and Surveillance Leaders Course
- Yank Levy
