= Sissiosasto/5.D =

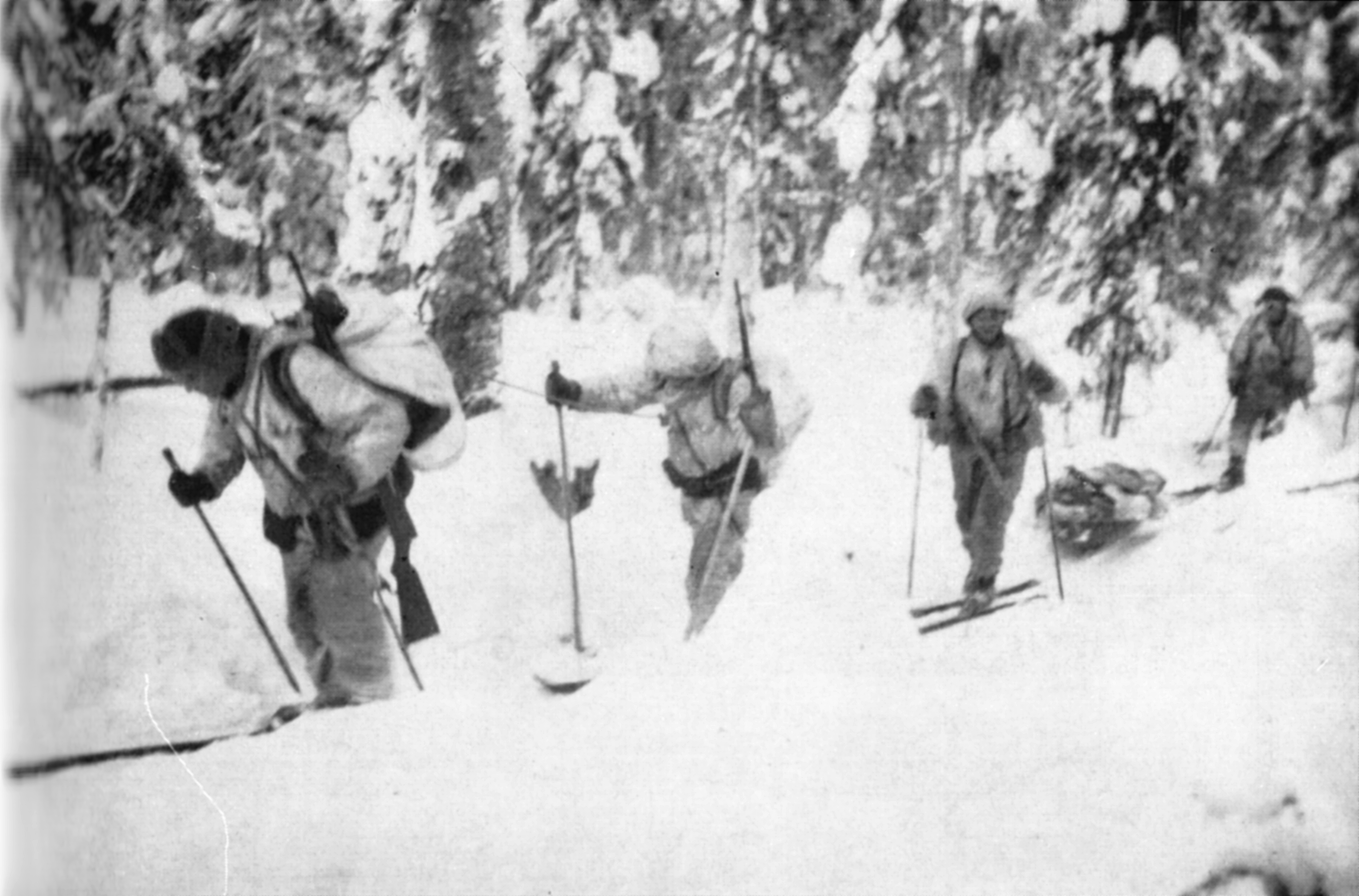
Finnish Ski Patrol in the Continuation War.

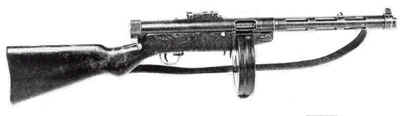
Suomi KP/-31, SMG used by SissiOs./5.D.

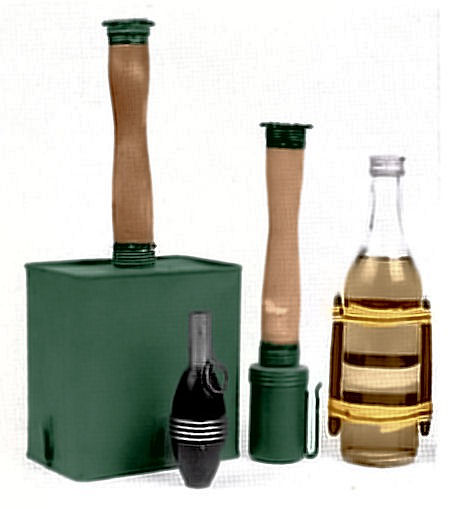
Demolition devices used by SissiOs./5.D. From left: satchel charge, hand grenades and Molotov cocktail.

Sissiosasto/5.D (5th Division Sissi Detachment, SissiOs./5.D, Unit Identification Code 2272) was a Finnish Army special sissiunit during the Continuation War. The Detachment was founded on August 20, 1941, under the Lynx Division (5th Division, Finnish VI Corps). It was a self-contained unit for reconnaissance patrolling, sabotage and guerrilla warfare operations behind enemy lines.

SissiOs./5.D was rounded up by Second Lieutenant V.I. Laajoki from the 51 volunteers he recruited from the 5th Division sub-units (e.g. JR 22). In the autumn of 1941 SissiOs./5.D did short reconnaissance patrols in the recently captured areas by the Svir River. From the beginning of 1942, the detachment took part on longer reconnaissance patrols, independently and together with other Sissiunits.

== Šemenski-Pertjärvi ==
In April 1942 Osasto Uimonen (ad hoc squad, size of a company) was formed from SissiOs./5.D, SissiOs./17.D and Osasto Vehniäinen, the squad was named after the commander of SissiOs./5.D Lieutenant E.A. Uimonen. They had an order to destroy a Soviet logistic centre, similar mission as Osasto Honkanen's highly successful destruction patrol to Petrovo-Jam's (Russian: Petrovskij Jam) logistics centre couple of months earlier. April 11 the squad was divided in two groups, as the plan was to surprise the Soviet troops in the front from both flanks. The group led by Lieutenant Uimonen faced the enemy soon and destroyed targeted squad, but they soon realised that they have been flanked by outnumbered enemy. The squad lost 7 men in the following battle, including Second Lieutenant V.J. Arponen and squadleader Uimonen, who stayed behind his withdrawing men with two volunteers to hold the enemy. The intel they had suggested the enemy strength on the area to be a platoon, but in reality Soviets had a whole battalion there. The Soviet troops Osasto Uimonen faced on the field were in fact preparing for a surprise attack, which they launched on the same day. After the mission failed and SissiOs./5.D lost all its acting officers, it was subordinated to Kevyt osasto 19 (KevOs 19) and took part in frontline battle in the Šemenski-Pertjärvi area until the end of April and Finnish defensive victory.

== SissiOs./5.D's K.I.A. ==
5th Division Sissi Detachment K.I.A.'s listed by the date of their death

Rank	Name	DoD
staff sergeant	Kärri, Kaarlo Einari	November 6, 1941
second lieutenant	Arponen, Viljo Johannes	April 11, 1942
officer student	Karttunen, Pentti Olavi	April 11, 1942
private first class	Klemetti, Väinö Olavi	April 11, 1942
private first class	Laine, Elis Vilho	April 11, 1942
sergeant	Onnela, Veikko Ilmari	April 11, 1942
private first class	Suontausta, Aarne Olavi	April 11, 1942
lieutenant	Uimonen, Erkki Armas	April 11, 1942
private first class	Kaspersson, Nils Birger	May 15, 1942
private first class	Väihkönen, Urho Uljas	April 27, 1943
sergeant	Saarinen, Esko Olavi	February 14, 1944
private first class	Alander, Sulo Aatos	June 25, 1944
private	Niva, Erkki Iisakki	June 25, 1944
corporal	Ahonen, Toivo Johannes	February 6, 1945

== See also ==
- Finnish conquest of East Karelia (1941)

== Sources ==
- Palmunen, Einar (1964). Hämäläisdivisioona jatkosodassa. Karisto.
- Palmunen, Einar (1966). Shemenskin Pertjärven taistelut. Karisto.
- Palmunen, Einar (1972). Hämäläisdivisioona etulinjasta kenttäsairaalaan. Karisto.
- Palmunen, Einar (1981). Ilvesdivisioona kuvissa. Karisto.
- "Suomen sodissa 1939-1945 menehtyneiden tiedosto". Arkistolaitos. 2007.
