= Matias Petäistö =

Finnish ex-soldier and television personality (born 1990)

- Born: 1990 (age 35–36); Kalajoki, North Ostrobothnia, Finland
- Military career
- Allegiance: Finland
- Branch: Finnish Army
- Service years: 10
- Rank: Staff Sergeant
- Unit: Special Jaeger Platoon
- Conflicts: War in Afghanistan; Iraqi War
- Other work: Television personality; Entrepreneur; Personal trainer

Matias Petäistö (born 1990) is a Finnish entrepreneur, personal trainer, and former Special Operation Forces soldier for the Finnish Army, with 10 years of experience on high-risk crisis management operations for the prestigious Utti Jaeger Regiment.

He runs an online training program called Petäistö Coaching, and is also the owner of Ski centre Sveitsi, at Hyvinkää. He is also known for appearing in television series Erikoisjoukot as one of the four instructors, alongside his Navy colleagues.

He worked for the Defence Forces' Army in several operations for Afghanistan and Iraq as a pioneer and deputy leader. His military rank in the Army was Ylikersantti (Staff Sergeant), a rank above the Sergeant in the Finnish military.

Born in Kalajoki and currently living in Porvoo, Petäistö is the godson of Finnish reporter Helena Petäistö. He was married to Anette Petäistö. They divorced in 2025, as a result of Matias being away from home for long period of time, and "no real relationship" has occurred.
