= Minna Aaltonen =

Finnish actress (1966–2021)

- Born: Minna Kaisa Aaltonen; 17 September 1966; Turku, Finland
- Died: 11 September 2021 (aged 54)
- Education: Mountview Theatre School
- Occupations: film actress, television actress and presenter

Minna Kaisa Aaltonen (17 September 1966 – 11 September 2021) was a Finnish film actress, television actress and presenter.

== Biography ==
Aaltonen was born in Turku, Finland. Her mother was Finnish actress Leena Takala.

Aaltonen studied acting at the Mountview Theatre School in London, England, during the late 1980s.

As a television actress, Aaltonen played Marianne in drama series London's Burning and Ingrid Coates in drama series Dream Team. She also appeared in The Bill, Dalziel and Pascoe, The World of Hemingway and Lexx. Aaltonen had a small uncredited part as a newsreader in the 1997 James Bond film Tomorrow Never Dies. Aaltonen appeared in beer advertisements in Ireland.

In her native Finland, Aaltonen starred in Kotikatu, Kadunlakaisijat, Vääpeli Körmy ja vetenalaiset vehkeet, Äidin tyttö and Kauas pilvet karkaavat. In 1994, Aaltonen was a co-host of MTV3's game show Gladiaattorit (Finnish Gladiators), presenting alongside Juha-Pekka Jalo.

Aaltonen died on 11 September 2021, due to complications after a surgery.
