= Martina Aitolehti =

Finnish actress (born 1982)

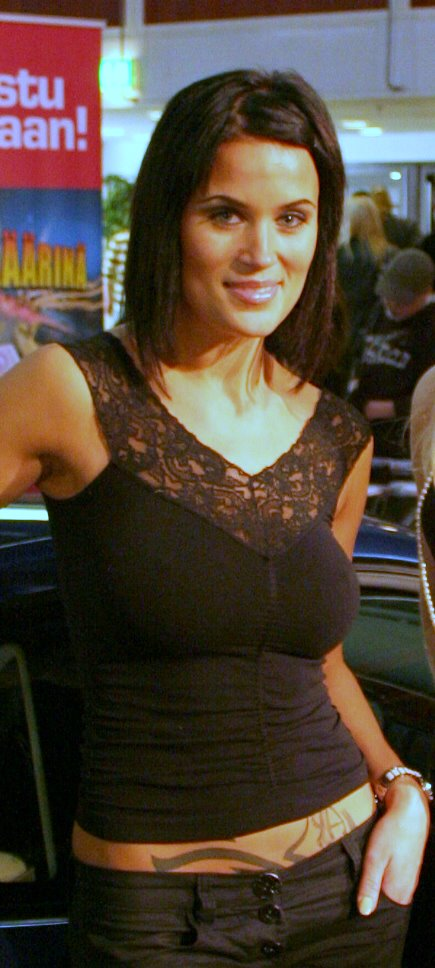
- Martina Aitolehti in 2007.
- Born: Minna Kortelampi; 16 July 1982 (age 44)
- Occupations: Model, singer, television personality

Martina Aitolehti (previously Martina Kortelampi) (born 16 July 1982) is a Finnish actress, TV host, model, singer and beauty pageant titleholder.

== Life and career ==
Aitolehti started her career as a beauty pageant titleholder, winning the title of Miss Earth Finland 2001. She represented her country at Miss Earth 2001 but was unplaced. She also represented Finland in Miss Hawaiian Tropic 2004. She ranked twice as a semi-finalist in the 2000 and 2001 Miss Finland pageants.

In 2004, Aitolehti became a household name and a tabloid celebrity because of her alleged secret affair with the famed Finnish soccer player Alexei Eremenko, who was in a relationship with another woman at the time. Nicknamed as a "Secret Lover" by the Finnish tabloid media, Aitolehti posed for the Finnish edition of Hustler magazine and recorded an album with another "secret lover" Marika Fingerroos.

During the following years, Aitolehti got married with Esko Eerikäinen, a member of the all-male erotic dance group Scandinavian Hunks, and started appearing in reality television shows, including Big Brother Finland, and had a small role in the Finnish daily soap opera Salatut elämät (Secret Lives). She also founded her own dance group Dazzling Ladies, dancing and singing with the group all around Finland.

Aitolehti and her then-husband Esko Eerikäinen starred in their own reality television series Martina & Esko: Vauvakuumetta (Martina & Esko: Baby Fever) and Martina & Esko: Isku Kolumbiaan (Martina & Esko: Strike to Colombia) on Sub in 2010 and 2011. The shows followed their everyday life from having a baby to visiting Eerikäinen's family and friends in Colombia.

In recent years, Aitolehti and Eerikäinen have divorced and she has started a career as a singer. She released her debut solo album Martina through the Universal Music Finland label in March 2011. She was let go by the record label six months later.

In 2012, Aitolehti was pregnant with her second child. She also appeared in a new reality television show called Viidakon tähtöset (The Stars of the Jungle), which is similar in format to the British reality show I'm a Celebrity...Get Me Out of Here!.

In 2014, Aitolehti featured as a presenter and somewhat bossy instructor in a lifeguard themed reality TV format, which is marketed internationally under the title All-Star Lifeguards!. The second season of the show premiered in 2015. The reality show features Kimmo Vehviläinen and Ola Tuominen as the narrators and Martina's cast of other Finnish celebrities such as: Janita Lukkarinen, Jasmin Voutilainen, Isabel Ljungdell, Sahra Ali, Melissa Roos, Jasmine Tukiainen, Kristina Karjalainen, Sabina Särkkä, Sara Sieppi, Belinda Heinonen, Minna Sara, Rosanna Kulju, Anne-Mari Miettinen, Amanda Harkimo, Evelina Lorek, Nora Vuorio, Rita Niemi, Suvi Pitkänen, Linda Danakas, Elina Tervo, Kimmo Kemppi, Jucci Hellström and Anne Hiltunen.

In 2017, Aitolehti participated in the Finnish Gladiators TV-series, Gladiaattorit, with a role name "Pantteri" (Panther). From 2020 to 2021, she was in a relationship with an Iraqi-born man who participated in the Nationalmuseum robbery in Sweden. Aitolahti also had a relationship with Stefan Therman since 2011 and later with ex-ice hockey star Hannu Pikkarainen, who was convicted of rape in 2022 to 2 years imprisonment.

== Criminal convictions ==
In 2010, Aitolehti was convicted of one count of assault, illegal threat and violation of domicilary peace.

In 2014, Aitolehti was convicted of one count of drunk driving.

In 2018, Aitolehti was convicted of one count of assault.

In 2020, Aitolehti was convicted of one count of driving without a driving licence.

== Discography ==
=== Albums ===
- Salarakkaat (Secret Lovers) with Marika Fingerroos (Edel Music, 2005)
- Martina (Universal Music Finland, 2011)

=== Singles ===
- "9 Digits" (Universal Music Finland, 2011)
- "Diamond Cuts Diamond" (Universal Music Finland, 2011)
- "Red Light On" (Universal Music Finland, 2011)
- "Checkmate" (Universal Music Finland, 2011)
