= Gladiaattorit =

Finnish game show

- Genre: Sports, game show
- Directed by: Renny Harlin
- Presented by: Juha-Pekka Jalo (1993–1994); Heikki Paasonen (2017); Viivi Pumpanen (2019)
- Narrated by: Katariina Ebeling (1993); Minna Aaltonen (1994); Antero Mertaranta (2019)
- Country of origin: Finland
- Original language: Finnish
- No. of seasons: 5

Production
- Producer: Markus Selin
- Production locations: Planet FunFun, Kerava (1993–1994); Tampere Exhibition and Sports Centre (2017)
- Running time: 45 minutes
- Production companies: Harlin & Selin Productions (1993–1994); MGM Television (2017); MTV Warner Bros. Finland (2019)

Original release
- Network: MTV3 (1993–1994, 2019); Nelonen (2017)
- Release: 1993 – 1994

Gladiaattorit is a Finnish competition television program part of the international Gladiators franchise.

== Original series ==
The show originally ran for three seasons from 1993 to 1994; it was directed by Hollywood director Renny Harlin, produced by Markus Selin, and filmed at Planet FunFun. It was hosted by Juha-Pekka Jalo alongside Katariina Ebeling in 1993 and Minna Aaltonen in 1994.

It was rerun on the original MTV3 channel in 2002.

=== Participants ===
Persons becoming famous from the show included Tony Halme (Viikinki—Gladiator Viking) who would become a member of the parliament and Virpi Butt (Timantti—Gladiator Diamond) who committed a murder in 2003.

Competitors Pirjo Litilia, Riikka Hartikainen, Jarmo Jousisto, and Tommi Vuoristo would later compete on International Gladiators 1. Gladiators Flash (Salama—Marjo Krishi) and Terminator (Terminaattori — Mikko Tukonen) would also appear on IG1.

== Revivals ==
On 6 April 2017, it was announced that the show, owned by MGM Television, will return to the airwaves in Finland for a revival on Nelonen. The new series will be hosted by Heikki Paasonen and recorded at Tampere Exhibition and Sports Centre.

It was announced that in 2019 a new series of Gladiaattorit would return to its original television channel MTV3. The relaunched series was hosted by Viivi Pumpanen and Antero Mertaranta. Filming of the series began on 11 February 2019 and is produced by MTV Warner Bros. International Television Production Finland. There were seven new Gladiators joining the team, with six staying from the previous series in 2017. Legendary original Gladiator Mohikaani (Mika Ounaskari) joined the show as the Gladiators coach and event expert.

== Events ==
Event name(s) in Finnish	English translation(s) or Event name	Included in the original series	Included in 2017 series	Included in 2019 series	Description of event
Läpimurto	Breakthrough and Conquer	Yes	No	Yes	Breakthrough and Conquer from the original American series (1989–96).
Kaksintaistelu	Duel (UK); Joust (US)	Yes	No	Yes	Duel (UK) or Joust (US).
Viidakon valtias / Teräsrenkaat / Ilmarenkaat	Hang Tough	Yes	Yes	Yes	Contestant tries to swing themselves to gladiator's platform with rings
Ihmiskuulat / Taistelupallo	Atlasphere	Yes	Yes	Yes	Contestants and gladiators score points by moving inside metal spheres
Kaupunkisota / Vaaran vyöhyke	Danger Zone (UK); Assault (US)	Yes	No	Yes	The game of Assault on the original US series.
Taistelupallo	Powerball	Yes	Yes	Yes	Contestants try to score balls on field, while gladiators tackle them
Luotikuja / Kouru	Gauntlet	Yes	Yes	No	Contestant tries to pass gladiators in a narrow alley
Cliffhanger / Seinä	The Wall	Yes	No	Yes	Wall climbing contest with chasing gladiators
Pyramidi	Pyramid	No	Yes	No	Gladiators attempt to prevent contestants from reaching the top
Kaksintaistelu	Suspension Bridge	No	Yes	No	From the UK version, Suspension Bridge.
Sieppaus	Swingshot	No	Yes	No	Swingshot (game on original US version)
Ilmapaini	Earthquake	No	Yes	Yes	Wrestling on a hanging sky platform
Hit and Run	Hit and Run	No	No	Yes	Contestants try to carry balls, while gladiators attempt to push them down with pendulums
Nopeusrata		No	No	Yes	Sports track, where two fastest contestants advance to the finals
Stunt-rata / Takaa-ajo / Loppurata	The Eliminator	Yes	Yes	Yes	The final stunt track, where winner will win the contest

== Gladiators ==
Season	Full name	Gladiator name	Signature move or costume
1990s	Virpi Butt	Timantti (Diamond)	
1990s	Tony Halme	Viikinki (Viking)	
1990s	Tuija Elo (nee Hokkanen)	Laser	
1990s	Pasi Paavisto	Retu	
1990s	Mikko Tukonen	Terminaattori (Terminator)	
1990s	Lisbet Hälikkä	Skorpioni (Scorpion)	
1990s	Marjo Krishi	Salama (Flash)	
1990s	Mika Ounaskari	Mohikaani (Mohican)	Mohican's face was painted with war stripes
1990s	Agneta Honkala (nee Granfors)	Cobra	
1990s	Timo Honkala	Turbo	Always happy and smiling
1990s	Merja Ryytty	Barbi (Barbie)	
1990s	Kari Pötrönen	Vääpeli (Feldwebel, a non-commissioned military officer rank)	Feldwebel yelled about the greatness of the Finnish army after he won a battle.
1990s	Kirsti Tapiola	Pantteri (Panther)	
1990s	Minna Ryynänen	Safiiri (Sapphire)	
1990s	Ilkka Kinnunen	Barbaari (Barbarian)	
1990s	Hanssi Fell	Lalli (Lalli, a Finnish historical figure)	
1990s	Annette Söderling	Hurrikaani (Hurricane)	
1990s	Matti Lindholm	Torpedo	
1990s	Jussi Hokkanen	Teräs (Steel)	
1990s	Timo Kangasluoma	Haukka (Hawk)	
1990s	Marianne Kiukkonen	Amazoni (Amazon)	
2017, 2019	Minna Pajulahti	Barbi (Barbie)	Jump to the splits
2017, 2019	Oona Tolppanen	Safiiri (Sapphire)	Big smile
2017, 2019	Milena AbbasMamode	Skorpioni (Scorpion)	
2017, 2019	Juha Mentula	Viikinki (Viking)	
2017, 2019	Vertti Harjuniemi	Titaani (Titan)	
2017, 2019	Terhi Lumme	Cobra	
2017	Martina Aitolehti	Pantteri (Panther)	Has the manner of being bad girl
2017	Suski Mantila	Salama (Flash)	
2017	Laura Saarinen	Hurrikaani (Hurricane)	
2017	Rita Niemi-Manninen	Laser	
2017	Jere Tiihonen	Mohikaani (Mohican)	Dressed in Native American imitation costume
2017	Hannes Hyvönen	Hurja (Ferocious)	
2017	Amin Asikainen	Kivinyrkki (Stone Fist)	
2017	Rami Hietaniemi	Häjy (Mean Troublemaker)	Dressed in Pohjanmaa area's traditional vest
2017	Jucci Hellström	Terminaattori (Terminator)	Flirted in show, e.g. by handing out roses
2017	Aki Manninen	Turbo	Slapped contestants' bottoms
2019	Janica Timonen	Seireeni (Siren)	Calls with hand gesture
2019	Antti Halmo	Tankki (Tank)	
2019	Piia Pajunen	Tornado	Tumbling and cartwheels
2019	Ivo Angel Gonzales	Matador	Moves imaginary cloak like a matador
2019	Jouni Viitanen	Haukka (Hawk)	Moves hands as if they were flying like a Hawk
2019	Arja Halmo	Tiikeri (Tiger)	
2019	Luukas Lindeman	Soturi (Soldier)	Shoots with imaginary arrow; Warrior stripes painted on face.
