= Planet FunFun =

Amusement park in Finland

- Previously known as Fanfaari
- Location: Kerava, Finland
- Status: Defunct
- Opened: 1991
- Closed: 1995
- Owner: Among others, Renny Harlin
- Operating season: All year round

Attractions
- Roller coasters: 1
- Water rides: 0

Planet FunFun was an indoor amusement park located in Kerava, Finland. Originally the park was called Fanfaari but soon after the opening, new owners took over and renamed the park Planet FunFun. Among others, the Hollywood director Renny Harlin was one of the new owners. The new name came partly as a pun from the old name (Fanfaari pronounced in Finnish sounds similar as FunFun in English), but partly it was influenced by the other business ventures of the new owners, especially Harlin's. At the time, Harlin was running a Planet Hollywood restaurant in Helsinki, so naming the amusement park Planet FunFun was also influenced by the name of the restaurant.

After few years of operation, it was clear to the new owners that Planet FunFun was not going to be commercially successful. This happened despite the fact that Harlin was one of the most followed Finnish celebrities at the time, and he brought many "Hollywood things" to the park, such as film props from his films.

In addition, he and producer Markus Selin started the Finnish version of the television show American Gladiators, called Gladiaattorit, which was shot in Planet FunFun. All of these efforts were short-lived and didn't do much to attract people to the park. So in 1995 the park was closed for good and the rides were sold other parks. The Planet Hollywood restaurant was also closed and the Gladiaattorit television show was cancelled, both around the same time that Planet FunFun closed.

Today not much remains of the Planet FunFun, except for the rides which were sold and relocated. Planet FunFun's only roller coaster is now in Fort Fun Abenteuerland, Germany and its new name is Devil's Mine. Many people still recognize the name "Planet FunFun" and remember it having been a park run by Renny Harlin - the original park name Fanfaari and previous ownership is not as well remembered, because of Harlin's "celebrity gossip" influence.

The building that housed the park was an old Nokia rubber factory building that was renovated to amusement purposes. The building is known today as Klondyke-house. After the park was closed, the building was once again suited for new purposes. Today it houses Kerava Art Museum, and parts of the building are used as restaurant space, floorball arena, conference and exhibition space, etc.
