= Olli Tiainen =

Finnish peasant chieftain (1770–1833)

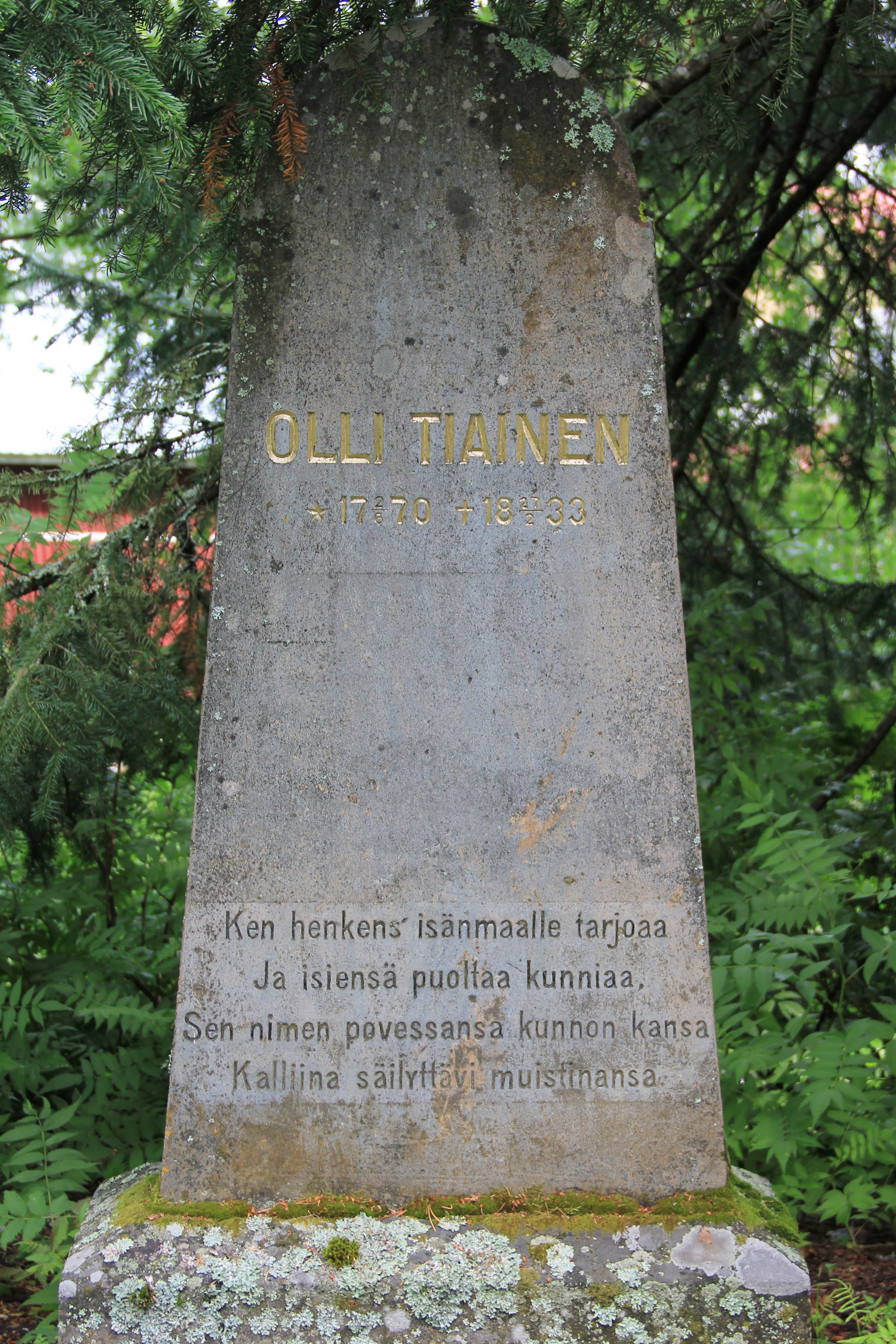
- Grave of Olli Tianen in Nurmes, Finland
- Native name: Olli Hemminginpoika Tiainen
- Born: 2 June 1770; Tiilikka village, Rautavaara
- Died: 27 February 1833 (aged 62) Ylikylä village, Nurmes
- Cause of death: Typhus
- Buried: Kirkkoharju Cemetery, Nurmes, Finland
- Allegiance: (Swedish Empire) Sweden
- Branch: Swedish Army
- Service years: 1788–1818
- Rank: Captain (Note: Border captain)
- Battles: Russo-Swedish War (1788–1790); Finnish War; Battle of Mönninvaara
- Awards: Gold bravery medal
- Spouse: Anna Tolvanen

Olli Tiainen (1770 – 1833), was a Finnish peasant chieftain and partisan leader. During the Finnish War, he successfully lead a free corps of Finnish peasants in several clashes with the Russians, with his most notable action being securing the rear of Johan August Sandels during his defence of Savo, and delaying a Russian advance towards Pielinen.

== Early life ==
Olli Tiainen, was born on 2 June 1770 to the peasants Hemminki Antinpoika Tiainen and Anna Niilontytär Leveinen in the village of Tiilikka in modern-day Rautavaara. The rest of his early life is mostly unknown.

== Service ==
It is known that Tiainen participated in the Russo-Swedish War (1788–1790) as a border guard in a peasant troop, the peacetime soldier job did not suit him, which is why he returned as a civilian after the war and became a tailor. In 1793, he would marry Anna Tolvanen from Ylikylä in Nurmes, he settled as an in-law on the home she owned.

Map visualizing the movements of Russian troops at the outbreak of the Finnish War.

=== Finnish War ===
In 1808, the peasants in the region of Pielis chose Olli as their leader, and when the Russians invaded Finland in 1808, they felt that Northern Karelia would be left to its fate. In response to this, Olli immediately travelled to Kuopio, where Johan Adam Cronstedt and the Savolax regiment was stationed. There, he received weapons for his peasant corps and was appointed border captain.

Battle of Mönninvaara

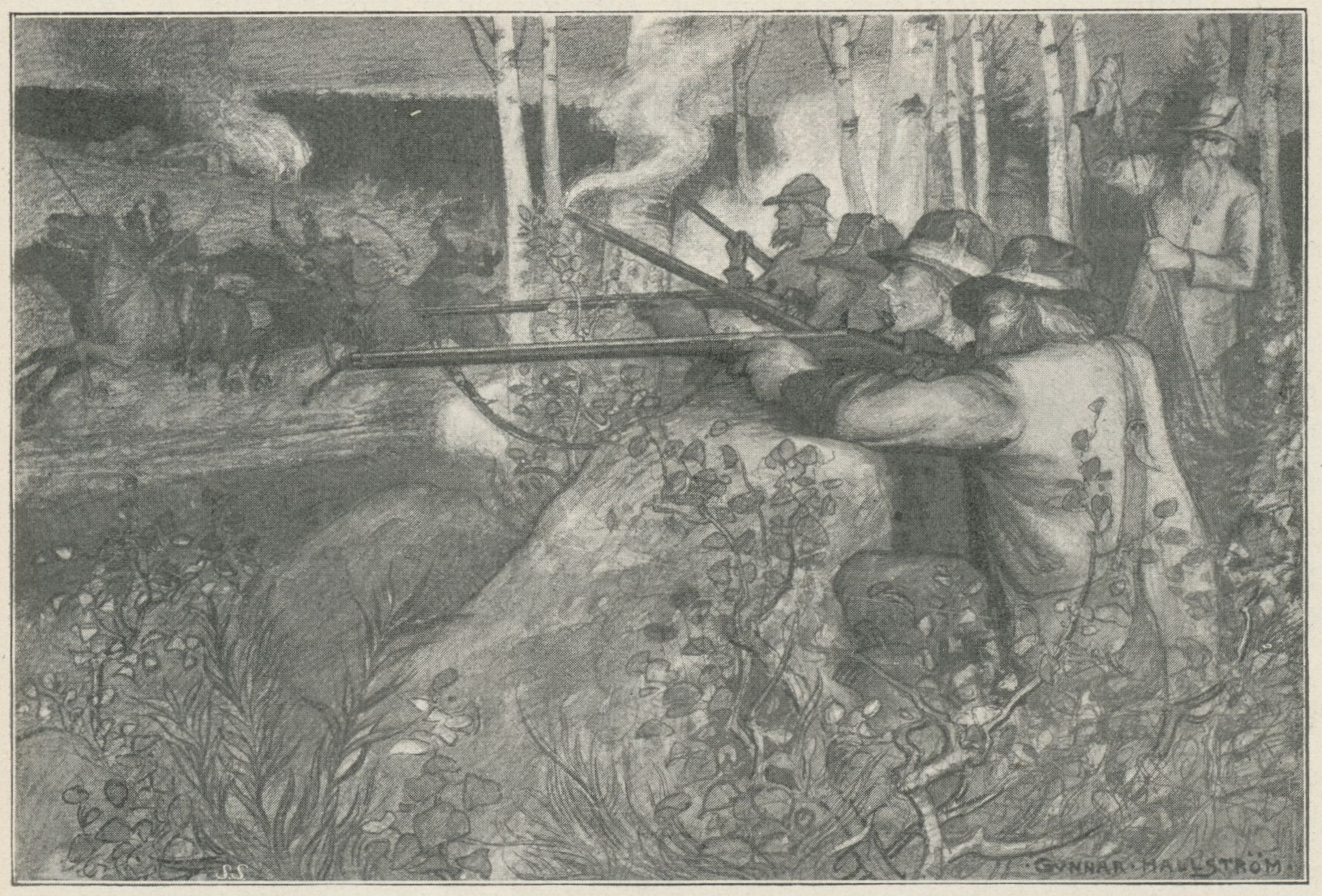
The Battle at Mönninvaara by Gunnar Hallström

==== Battle of Mönninvaara ====
In the summer of 1808, the hostilities in Northern Karelia would officially begin, with a Russian army under the command of Major General Alexejev attempting to march through Pälkjärvi to bypass Johan August Sandels and his troops in Toivola. Tiainen gathered up all the people around Pielisjärvi and in boats the peasants rowed to the south of the lake, after which they grouped up at Ahvenus on 30 July and then went to Mönninvaara to meet the Russian advance.

The vulnerable guard that was stationed in Mönninvaara quickly fled. Tiainen spread his forces in the rye fields and forest surrounding the road into Mönninvaara. On 31 July, the mobs of peasants under Olli and Isak Stenius attacked the Russian troops, which weren't able to pass. After a while, the Russians were able to get into an open field, but were attacked by the peasants again and Alexejev decided to retreat into Sordavala.

Mikhail Petrovich Dolgorukov

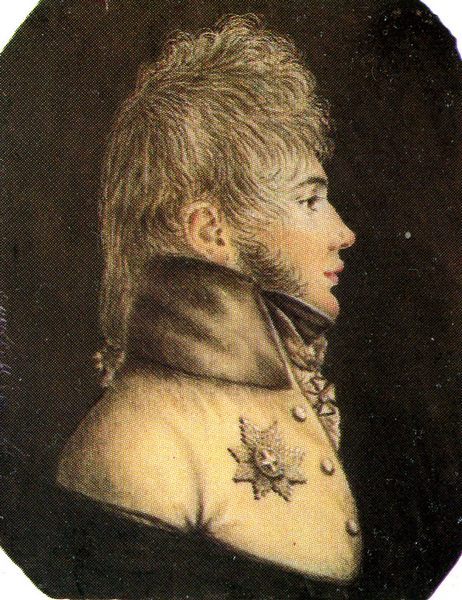
Mikhail Petrovich Dolgorukov (1780-1808)

=== Later clashes ===
In August, the Russians returned with 5,000 to Northern Karelia under the command of Mikhail Dolgoruky, who intended to cut off Johan August Sandels' retreat towards Idensalmi. Tiainen successfully lead his peasant forces and prevented the Russians from advancing west of Lake Pielisjärvi. Tiainens forces also clashed with the Russians at Kaltimonvirta, and when the Russians turned and attempted to advance towards east of Pielisjärvi, Tiainen met their advance at Jauhiaissalmi. According to the legend, Tiainen made his men wear armor and armed them with bayonets made from wood to make them appear like regular soldiers, after this, his men began marching in front of the Russian force multiple times, at a distance that made it harder to see the true strength of Tiainens force. The Russians believed that they were facing an overwhelming Swedish force and quickly withdrew to Joensuu.

From his base in Eno church village, Tiainen made several raids into Russian occupied territory, and in one of these raids Tiainen captured the Russian governor of Karelia, Otto von Fürstenberg along with his men. The Russians were so angered by this that they placed a 500 ruble bounty on Tiainens head, but nobody would be able to claim this bounty. After the truce in Olkijoki, Tiainen quickly disbanded his peasant corps and fled to Sweden, as he believed the Russians would not leave him at peace in Finland.

Gustav IV of Sweden

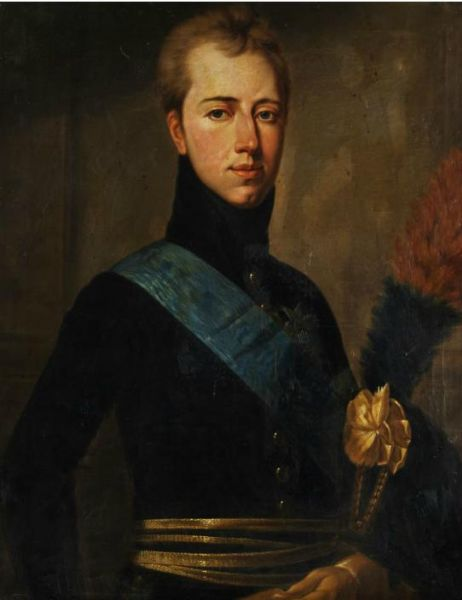
Portrait of Gustav IV in uniform by Per Krafft the Younger in 1801

== Later years ==
When Tiainen came to Stockholm, he was presented to King Gustav IV, who awarded him with a medal of bravery in gold and received a promise of a pension. He received the pension in 1810, but he still found himself in financial difficulties, despite this, he did not dare to return to Finland. He lived in Stockholm until 1816 when he moved to Haparanda and lived there until 1818 as a border guard corporal when he finally decided to return to Finland, more specifically Nurmes. To be safe, he remained as a Swedish subject until his death, and he refused to swear allegiance to the Russian Emperor.

== Death ==
In 1833, Tiainen would pass away from Typhus, and he was buried in Ylikylä village cemetery. Around a 100 years later, a memorial was unveiled in his honor in Joensuu.
