= Gulf of Finland Naval Command =

- Colour of the Command
- Active: 1998–2015
- Country: Finland
- Branch: Finnish Navy
- Role: Coastal defence
- Size: 850 career personnel, 1,400 conscripts
- Part of: Finnish Navy
- Headquarters: Upinniemi, Kirkkonummi
- Nickname: SLMEPA
- March: Suomenlahden marssi
- Equipment: MTO 85, 130 TK, Hamina class, Pohjanmaa

Gulf of Finland Naval Command (Finnish: Suomenlahden meripuolustusalue, Swedish: Finska vikens marinkommando) was a Finnish Navy unit headquartered in Upinniemi, Kirkkonummi.

The main duty of the Gulf of Finland Naval Command during normal condition was the surveillance of Finnish territorial waters and maintaining territorial integrity. In addition, the Command trained conscripts to fulfill duties in the war-time organisation of the Finnish Defence Forces. The readiness fortresses and particular other units of the Command were permanently in a state of high readiness. The Command was succeeded in 2015 by the Coastal Brigade.

== Organisation ==
- 7th Missile Squadron (7. Ohjuslaivue), operating Hamina class fast attack craft and Kiisla class patrol vessels.
- 5th Mine Warfare Squadron (5. Miinalaivue), operating Pohjanmaa and Pansio class minelayers. The squadron also includes the Finnish Navy Diving School, training conscripts and career personnel as combat and work divers.
- Suomenlinna Coastal Regiment, responsible for continuously keeping Isosaari fortress in state of readiness.
- Kotka Coast Battalion, responsible for the surveillance and defence of Kymenlaakso coast, including the major ports of Hamina and Kotka. The Battalion mans the Haapasaari Marine Surveillance Station and the maintains the fortress of Kirkonmaa at high readiness.
- Porkkala Coast Battalion (Porkkalan Rannikkopataljoona), responsible for providing logistics, force protection and coastal artillery support for the command headquarters in Upinniemi. In conscript training, the Battalion specializes in producing marine reconnaissance units of the Finnish Navy
- Navy Training Center (Merivoimien Koulutuskeskus), a unit responsible for the induction and basic training of most Finnish Navy conscripts. The Center also operates a large NCO school and provides training for rank-and-file logistics specialists. From time to time, the Center produced coastal infantry units.
- Logistics Centre (Huoltokeskus)
