= Amanda Harkimo =

Finnish reality TV star and DJ

Amanda Harkimo (born 30 November 1990) is a Finnish DJ and reality TV star.

== Early life ==
Harkimo was born in November 1990 in Sipoo, Finland, to Roy Juhani Harkimo and Johanna Ranne.

== Career ==
=== As a DJ ===
Harkimo is the official DJ for the Finnish KHL team Helsingin Jokerit, Finland men's national ice hockey team and Finland national basketball team. She played music at the IIHF World U20 Championship, Ice Hockey World Championships, IIHF World Women's Championships and European Basketball Championship. She started as a club DJ in 2012, and after played in several clubs; Finland, Sweden, Turkey, Spain, Estonia, Thailand and Malta. In 2013, she was the opening act for David Guetta at Weekend Festival in Helsinki.

=== As a reality TV star ===
Harkimo participated in many reality shows in Finland and one in Sweden. Her first TV show was Big Brother Finland where she spent 39 days. Harkimo won two of the TV shows she has participated in, Viidakon tähtöset in 2014 (similar to British TV show I'm a Celebrity...Get Me Out of Here!) and Martina ja hengenpelastajat. In 2015, she participated in one of Sweden's most watched TV shows, Paradise Hotel, and in 2018, she was a temptation on Temptation Island Suomi. She participated in Julkkisselviytyjät and Tuurin kyläkauppias ja kesäapulaiset. In 2016, Harkimo created her own TV show called Amanda ja pelimiehet where she traveled to Russia and North America to meet and interview KHL and NHL ice hockey players about their life and career. Harkimo is also known for winning in the first season of Erikoisjoukot, a Finnish reality series titled as the toughest in the country.

== Personal life ==
Harkimo's notable relatives include businessman and politician Hjallis Harkimo who is her paternal uncle, and cinematographer Osmo Harkimo who is her paternal grandfather. Through her paternal grandmother she is also a descendant of German-born Johan Friedrich Hackman who founded the Finnish cutlery and cookware company Hackman in 1790. A DNA test she took, showed that Harkimo is also 15.7% of Irish, Scottish and Welsh descent.
