= Utti Jaeger Regiment =

- Utin jääkärirykmentti
- Insignia of the Utti Jaeger Regiment
- Active: 1 July 1943 – 30 November 1944: Detached Battalion 4; 1 February 1962 – 31 December 1996: Parachute Jaeger School; 1 January 1997 – present: Utti Jaeger Regiment
- Country: Finland
- Branch: Finnish Army
- Type: Army aviation Special forces
- Size: 400 hired personnel, 220 conscripts (2018)
- Part of: Army Command Finland
- Garrison: Lentoportintie 11, Utti, Kouvola
- Motto(s): Excelsior
- Colors
- Equipment: RK 95 TP, MP5, Sako TRG, FN SCAR, RG-32 Scout, Polaris Sportsman
- Engagements: Winter War; Continuation War; Lapland War; War in Afghanistan
- Website: Official website

Insignia
- Cross of Merit

Aircraft flown
- Trainer: MD 500 (7)
- Transport: NH90 (20)

The Utti Jaeger Regiment (Finnish: Utin jääkärirykmentti, (UTJR) Special jaegers) is the Finnish Army training and development centre for special forces and helicopter operations in charge of the Army Special Forces Unit and the Special Forces Qualification Course.

== Function ==
=== Regiment ===
The Utti Jaeger Regiment is responsible for training special forces for the Finnish Army as well as upkeeping high readiness of the Army Special Forces Unit and helicopter operations and performing executive assistance tasks. The regiment consists of around 400 hired personnel and 220 conscripts according to sources from 2018. Its Special Jaeger Company (Finnish: erikoisjääkärikomppania) served during the War in Afghanistan, training security officials in medical care, firearms, and operational planning, and has been in standby duties as a part of the European Union Battlegroups and NATO Response Force. The Finnish special forces trace their history to the four long-range reconnaissance patrol detachments (Finnish: kaukopartio-osastot) and Detached Battalion 4 (Finnish: Erillinen pataljoona 4), which fought in the Winter War, Continuation War and Lapland War during 1939–1944. After the wartime units were demobilized in November 1944, the Army reinitiated organized special forces training in February 1962 by establishing the Parachute Jaeger School (Finnish: Laskuvarjojääkärikoulu, (LjK)) at Utti, near the city of Kouvola. On 1 January 1997, the Utti Jaeger Regiment was formed by merging the Parachute Jaeger School, Military Police School and Helicopter Wing. The Parachute Jaeger School was later reformed into the Special Jaeger Battalion and the Helicopter Wing reinforced into the Helicopter Battalion.

=== Special Jaeger ===
According to the newspaper Helsingin Sanomat, a typical special forces soldier has served in the Defence Forces for seven years and is around 28–29-years-old. On average, they run 3,180 m (3,480 yd) in a Cooper test and bench press 110 kg (240 lb). Before applying for and attending the year-long Special Forces Qualification Course, they often have served as a paratrooper or a combat diver during conscript service. Approximately 12 students are chosen for the course out of a 100 applicants after a four-day exam. All of the course attendees are trained in communications, engineer and medical care, and receive specializations later, such as sniper, vehicle, high-altitude military parachuting, military intelligence or forward air control training. Those chosen for career tracts after the basic course serve at either Utti Jaeger Regiment or Special Operations Detachment of the Naval Reconnaissance Battalion of the Coastal Brigade.

== Organisation ==
As of 2018, the Utti Jaeger Regiment is divided into three battalions in addition to the headquarters:

- Special Jaeger Battalion
  - Special Jaeger Company – hosts the special jaeger non-commissioned officers, maintains special forces readiness and capabilities of the Army, and oversees the Special Forces Qualification Course.
  - Paratrooper Company – trains conscripts in basic long-range reconnaissance patrol, sissi, urban and air assault operations.
- Helicopter Battalion – equipped with 20 NH90 tactical transport helicopters and 7 MD 500 light helicopters; responsible for all helicopter operations and training of the Defence Forces.
  - 1st Helicopter Company – high readiness unit supporting special operations forces and crisis management.
  - 2nd Helicopter Company – basic flight training and helicopter support for other forces.
  - Aircraft Maintenance Company
- Support Battalion
  - Support Company – trains conscripts in support tasks and handles logistics in cooperation with the Logistics Centre.
  - Logistics Centre

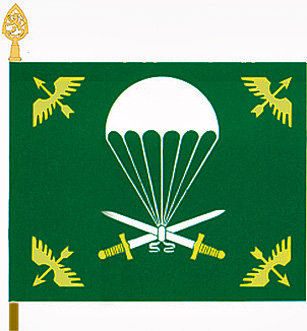
The traditional colours of the Special Jaeger Battalion, the colours of the former Parachute Jaeger School

== See also ==
- Finnish Border Guard
- Finnish Defence Intelligence Agency
- Jäger (infantry)
- Lauri Törni
- Police Rapid Response Unit (Finland)
