= Detached Battalion 4 =

- Erillinen Pataljoona 4 (ErP4)
- Active: 1 July 1943 – 30 November 1944
- Country: Finland
- Role: Special operations Long-range reconnaissance patrol
- Size: 4 operative companies, around 650 soldiers rotated during wartime; 1 transport aviation unit; 1 training center
- Part of: Intelligence Division
- Engagements: Continuation War, Lapland War
- Website: erillinenpataljoona4.fi

Detached Battalion 4 (Finnish: Erillinen Pataljoona 4 (ErP4)) was a special forces unit of the Finnish Army during the Continuation War and Lapland War, serving from July 1943 to November 1944. The battalion was founded under the Intelligence Division of Defence Command from the already operational long-range reconnaissance patrol detachments (Finnish: kaukopartio-osastot) created during the Interim Peace.

== History ==
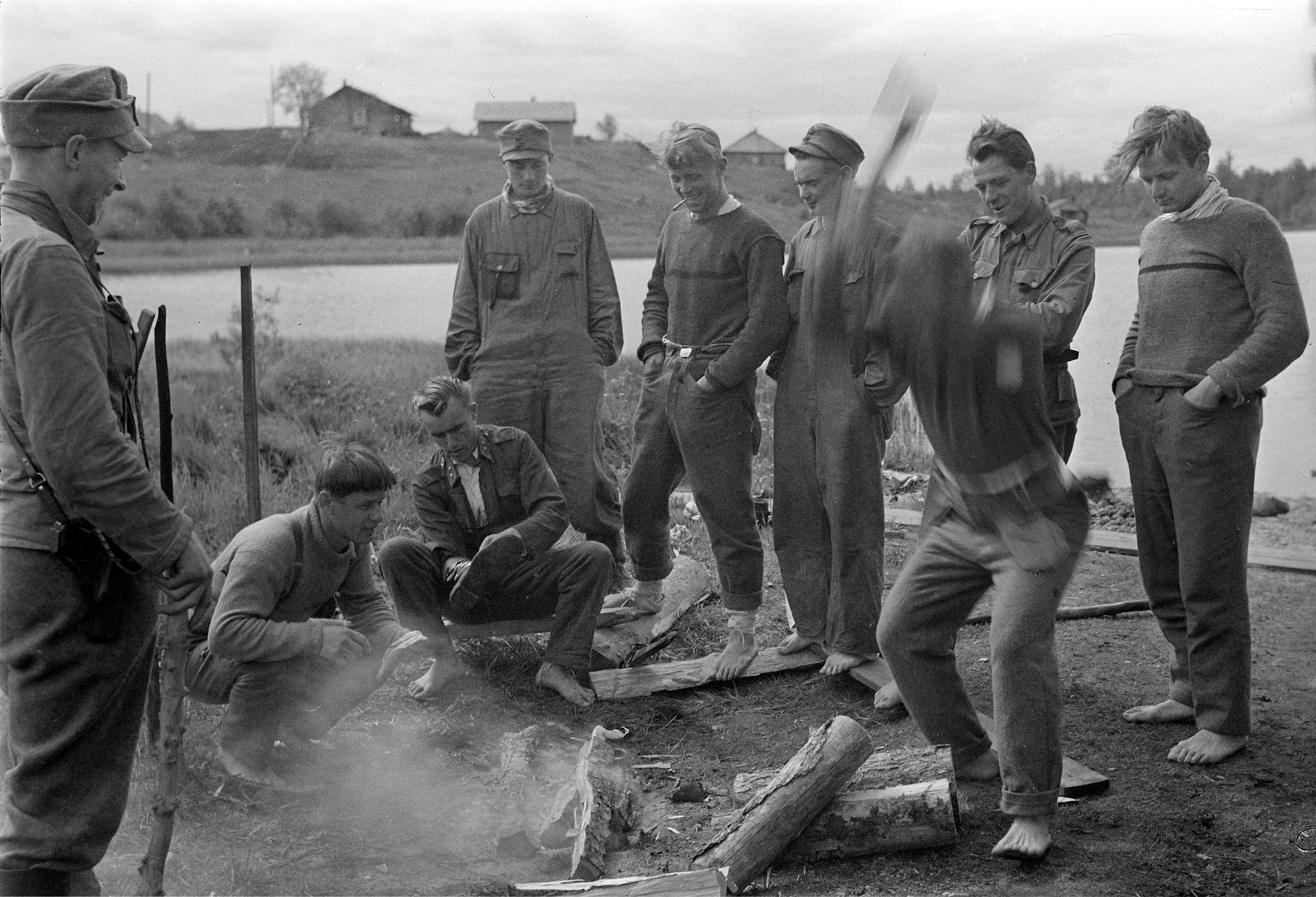
A team from Detached Battalion 4 waiting near Medvezhyegorsk in 1944 for Finnish forces to withdraw so they could enter Soviet territory to monitor troop movements "and stuff like that"—as phrased by the photographer

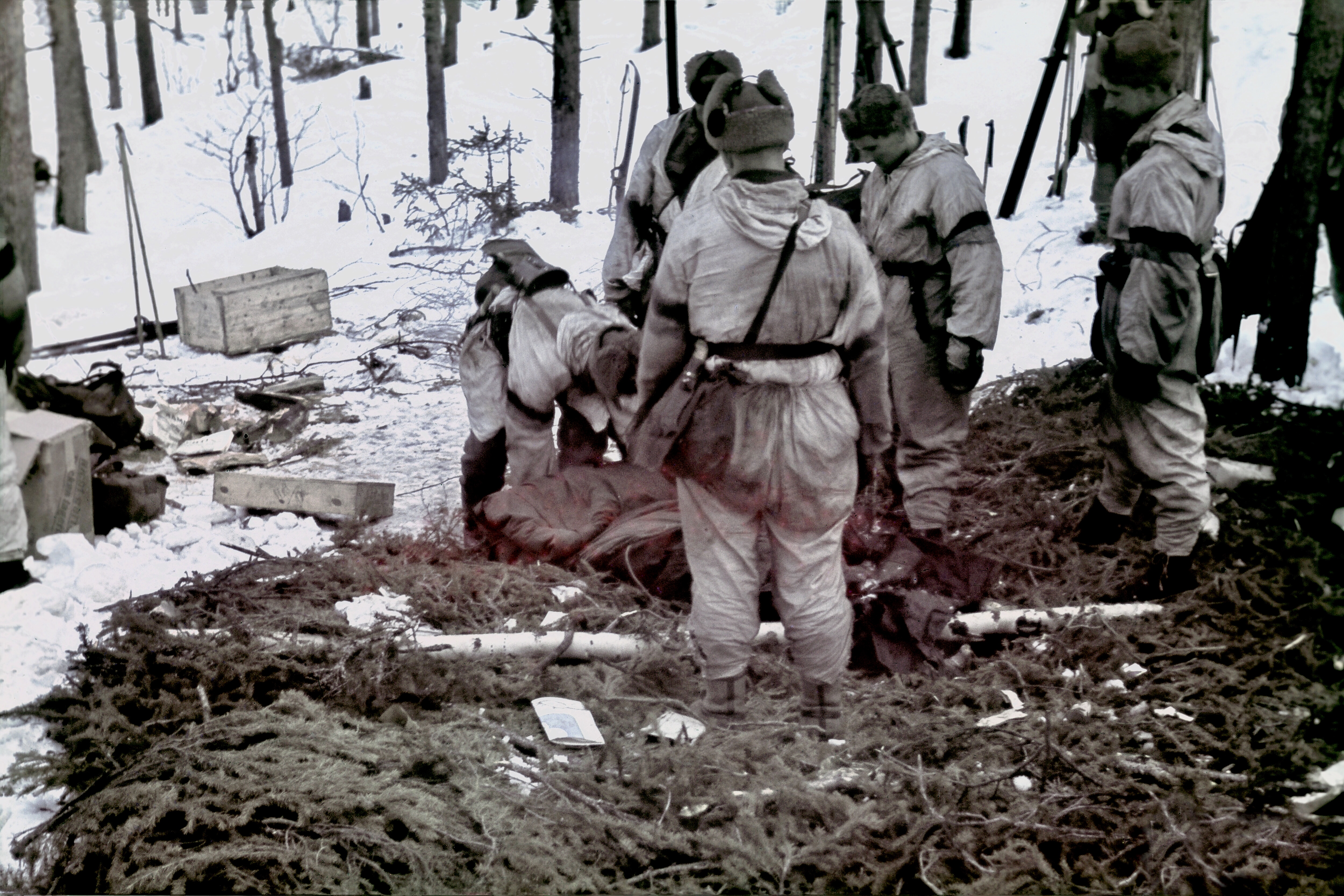
Soldiers of Detachment P breaking camp. Petsamo, 13 April 1942.

Long-range reconnaissance patrols (LRRP) were not used during the Winter War of 1939–1940. Immediately after the war ended, training was commenced to create patrol detachments for peacetime intelligence and prepare for a possible war. Most of the recruits were veterans from the Winter War; some were refugees from East Karelia and Ingria. Around 150 soldiers were trained and equipped before the Continuation War started on 25 June 1941. Four detachments were mobilized and tasked with missions to destroy enemy personnel and material assets, disrupt supply and communication lines as well as to interrogate prisoners and develop special forces tactics. At first, the detachments comprised only as few as 14 soldiers, but as the war progressed, their ranks were increased up to 40–60 men.

On 1 July 1943, the units were reorganised as companies of Detached Battalion 4 since direct command of the patrols became too consuming for the Intelligence Division. On 23 June 1944, a special operations aviation unit with amphibious Heinkel He 115 transport planes was established to support the battalion with insertions and extractions. Around 350 LRRPs were conducted during the wars. A total of over 650 soldiers served in the patrols during wartime and 90 died or went missing, including 2 from the Lotta Svärd female auxiliaries. The unit played a significant role during the Battle of Ilomantsi by disrupting Soviet supply lines. The battalion was demobilized on 30 November 1944 when the Lapland War came to an effective end. The modern Utti Jaeger Regiment was established in Detached Battalion 4's footsteps.

== Organisation ==
The operative units of the battalion were created during the Interim Peace and named after their commanders. They were reformed as companies within Detached Battalion 4 in July 1943:

- 1st Company / Detachment Vehniäinen, base of operations in Viipuri
- 2nd Company / Detachment Kuismanen, base of operations in Joensuu
- 3rd Company / Detachment Marttina, base of operations in Kajaani
- 4th Company / Detachment Paatsalo, base of operations in Rovaniemi
- Flight Detachment (or Detachment Jauri), base of operations in Mikkeli – founded 23 June 1944
- Training Center – founded 1 July 1944

== See also ==
- Erna long-range reconnaissance group
- Finnish Defence Intelligence Agency
- Lauri Törni
- Sissiosasto/5.D
