= Helmuth Ternberg =

Swedish Army major and intelligence officer

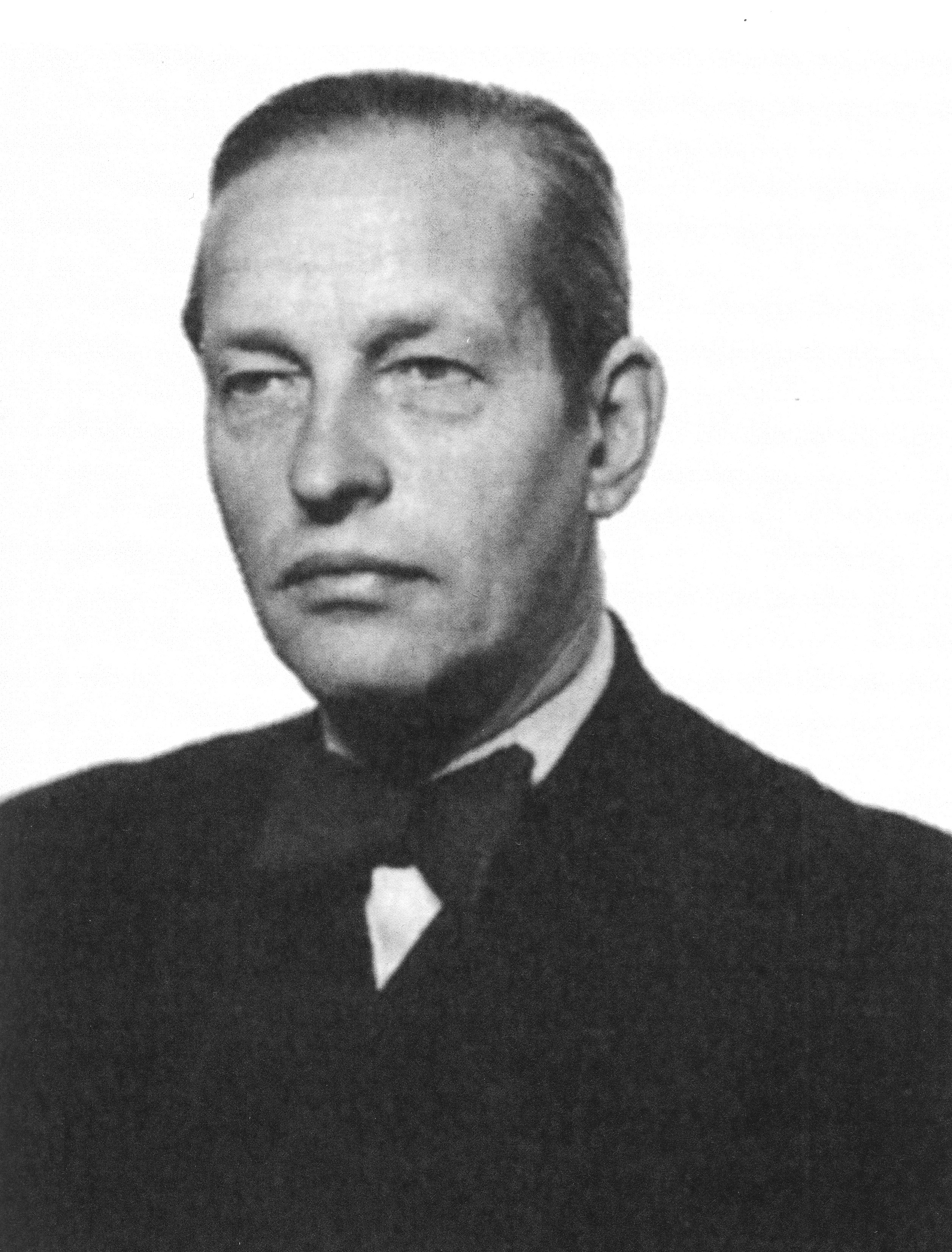
- Born: Ernst Axel Hellmuth Ternberg; 13 September 1893; Stockholm, Sweden
- Died: 24 May 1971 (aged 77); Worms, Germany
- Other name: "Teddy"
- Occupation: Intelligence officer
- Known for: Work for C-byrån
- Spouse: Brita Dahl (divorced 1938)
- Partner: Ebba Ridderstad

Ernst Axel Hellmuth "Teddy" Ternberg (13 September 1893 – 24 May 1971) was a Swedish Army major and intelligence officer who led, together with Carl Petersén, the intelligence service C-byrån during World War II. One of the most spectacular intelligence operations under Ternberg's leadership was the recruitment of the German Erika Wendt, also known as Erika Schwarze, as an agent of C-byrån. Wendt was active, as a secretary, within the German intelligence service Abwehr in Stockholm and provided Ternberg with information about, among other things, Gestapo activities in Sweden. He was also good friends with German spymaster Wilhelm Canaris, the head of Abwehr in Berlin. Ternberg continued his intelligence activities under a cover name after the war at T-kontoret, the successor organization to C-byrån.

== Early life ==
Ternberg was born on 13 September 1893 in Stockholm, the second son of Robert Ternberg, a naval engineer, and his wife Augusta Ottilia (née Limberg). The mother had German-Russian parents and grew up on the Marienhof estate in Livonia. The parents met in Sevastopol in the Crimea where his father worked to build up the Imperial Russian Navy. In 1889 they married and settled in Sweden. Robert Ternberg was employed by the Swedish Navy and participated in the construction of coastal defence ships and torpedo cruisers. The mother was educated at Dorpat University and worked as a teacher. Through his parents, he and his older brother (Egon, later a commander in the navy) became both German and Russian speakers. Ternberg grew up in Östermalm in Stockholm and passed studentexamen at Östra Real in 1912. Ternberg's family socialized regularly with the family of Olof Palme, Sweden's future prime minister.

== Career ==
Ternberg was commissioned as an officer in 1915 and was assigned to Dalarna Regiment in Falun as a second lieutenant. He was promoted to lieutenant in 1918. Ternberg left the army in 1920 and lived a bohemian life in Berlin. During the 1920s, Ternberg probably made many valuable contacts in Germany in politics and in the military. He re-entered service in 1922 with, among other things, probationary service at the aerial reconnaissance school and service with the Norrbotten Regiment. Back at the Dalarna Regiment, he became a captain in 1930 and then began civilian activities. Ternberg was employed at Törnbloms Annonsbyrå in Stockholm, but quit after a few years and went to sea as a sailor and stoker on ships in the North Sea and the Mediterranean. For a time he lived in Marseille, France. Back in Sweden, Ternberg became sales manager at Marabou (he became close friends with the owner Henning Throne-Holst) and then came to work for the newspaper tycoon Torsten Kreuger. He spent a lot of time in Germany on behalf of Kreuger and made many important acquaintances. It is said that during this time Ternberg met Admiral Wilhelm Canaris (later head of the Abwehr) and built up a large network of contacts in business and politics.

Towards the end of the 1930s, Ternberg was back at the Dalarna Regiment. In early December 1939, Ternberg was called up for duty as an intelligence officer and head of Department 1B, VI Army Division in Norrbotten near the Finland–Sweden border. The entire department consisted of three people: Captain Ternberg and two interpreters, a docent in Turkish from Lund, Gunnar Jarring, (who later made a career as a diplomat) who knew Russian and Fahle Isberg who knew Finnish. He quickly built up a network of contacts with the local population and people within the forest companies. Through these, Ternberg came across maps, which were used in the courier operations to report Russian activity. In the beginning of April 1940, Ternberg was stationed as an intelligence officer in Värmland with headquarters in Arvika. There he established a network of observers with the task of monitoring all movements of foreigners on the border with Norway. One of these strangers Ternberg was able to identify as Ernst Wollweber, the leader of an anti-fascist saboteur organization. He was arrested and jailed in Sweden. During the time hostilities occurred in Norway (until May/June 1940), Ternberg and his associates made several "excursions" to various war zones and were able to map German troop movements and also visit Norwegian combat units.

One of the first to be recruited to C-byrån was Gunnar Jarring. In the spring of 1940, Ternberg was contacted by Carl Petersén, who had been tipped off about Ternberg by Jarring (who worked as an interpreter for Ternberg at the Finnish border). According to Jarring, Ternberg was a rare fit for intelligence service. Ternberg became Petersén's closest collaborator and responsible for controlling what happened in Germany and the Soviet Union. One of the reasons for the enrollment was that Ternberg mastered both the German and Russian languages and had a large network of contacts, especially in Germany. Ternberg often traveled to Germany and met there politicians and military. He regularly visited the Abwehr and its head Wilhelm Canaris. On 20 May 1941, Ternberg received information that the German battleship Bismarck had passed Kullen on its way north. Ternberg immediately contacted Norwegian naval attaché Ragnvald Alfred Roscher Lund in Stockholm, who in turn alerted British naval attaché Henry Denham. It was the prelude to the chase of Bismarck, which was finally sunk by the British off the west coast of France on 27 May.

Ternberg traveled a lot and visited various theaters of war, mainly in the east. The Baltics were in the fall of 1941 in German hands. Ternberg, with the Abwehr's permission, made an extensive trip to survey the situation. On many occasions, Ternberg visited various front sections, including during the German siege of Leningrad. Very early on, Ternberg came into contact with the resistance movements in Denmark and Norway and established good personal relationships with leading resistance men and women, including Jutta Graae. The Swedish security service searched for a long time for the possibility of getting an "agent in place" at the German legation in Stockholm. Through wiretapping of the Abwehr employees at the German legation, it was concluded that the 24-year-old secretary Erika Wendt was anti-Nazi and a possible "agent in place". Ternberg was entrusted with the task of trying to recruit Erika Wendt, which he succeeded in doing. Erika Wendt worked for Sweden under the cover name "Onkel" from 1942 to the late summer of 1944. After the end of the war, Ternberg was promoted to major in the Swedish Army in 1946, and participated in the dismantling of the C-byrån and the creation of the successor T-kontoret. Jan Rydström, a lawyer at C-byrån, became very good friends with Ternberg and when Rydström became head of the East Economic Bureau after the war (part of the intelligence service), Ternberg was given the task of being knowledgeable through extensive traveling in Europe. Until his death in 1971, Ternberg, just like before, traveled a lot and lived most of the year in Worms. There he had a large network of contacts with post-war politicians, soldiers, scientists and financiers.

The journalist Bobo Scheutz has described Ternberg as "experienced, articulate, a ladies' man and something of a charming playboy, qualities that came in handy for someone who would rub shoulders in the salons and embassies of Stockholm and Berlin".

== Personal life ==
For a few years in the 1930s, Ternberg was married to fashion designer Brita Dahl, but the couple divorced in 1938. After the divorce, Ternberg met Ebba Ridderstad (née Pauli) and together with her he built a home on Fångö in the Gryt archipelago in Östergötland.

== Death ==
Ternberg died on 24 May 1971 in Worms, Germany. He was at the time of his death living in a cabin on the small island of Stora Horskär in Gryt Parish in Valdemarsvik Municipality, Östergötland County. Ternberg was interred on 18 April 1972 at Galärvarvskyrkogården in Stockholm. The epitaph of his gravestone reads: "Major Hellmuth Ternberg, born 13/9 1893, died 25/5 1971. The fatherland's eye and ear 1940-1945".
