= Jane Horney =

Swedish World War II spy (1918–1945)

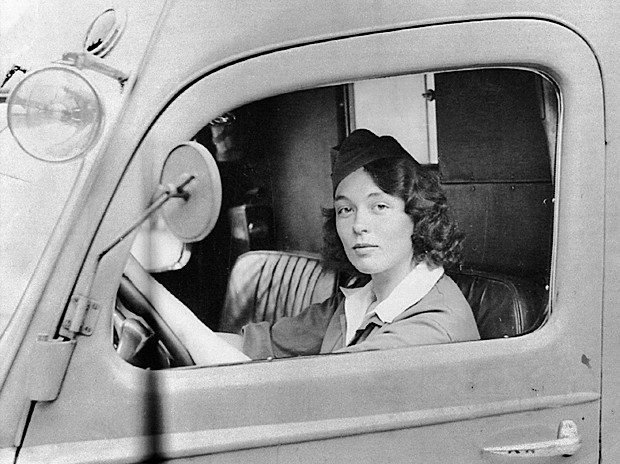
- Jane Horney in 1940
- Born: Ebba Charlotta Horney; 8 July 1918; Gustaf Vasa församling, Stockholm, Sweden
- Died: 20 January 1945 (aged 26); Øresund, Sweden
- Cause of death: Assassination
- Spouse: Herje Granberg (m. 1939–1943)

Jane Horney (born Ebba Charlotta Horney; married Granberg; 8 July 1918 – 20 January 1945), was a Swedish woman, believed to have spied in Denmark, and to have been killed by the Danish resistance movement on a fishing boat at Øresund, but it has never been confirmed for which nation she actually worked. The Gestapo in Denmark believed that she was an agent for the British or Soviet Union, and after World War II it was denied that she had been a Gestapo agent. Abwehr officers likewise denied, when asked by Swedish intelligence SÄPO, that she had been their agent.

== Background ==
Ebba Charlotta Horney was born in Sweden as the daughter of Swedish civil engineer Fredrik Horney. Her mother was a Danish nurse. There were two younger siblings: Johan and Britt-Marie. Horney grew up in Sweden, and from the age of 14, she was educated in London in an English private school for girls. In 1934, she took the name Jane, and became known as Jane Horney. In 1937–38, she travelled to Greenland, and then sold her travel experiences to the newspapers in Stockholm, where she later worked as a secretary and journalist. She married the Swedish journalist Herje Granberg, who worked for the newspaper Aftonbladet, in Bromma church in December 1939.

== Agent ==
In the autumn of 1941, her husband became his newspaper's correspondent in Berlin, and she followed him there. The couple divorced in 1943, and she moved to Denmark, where she was employed at Skandinavisk Telegrambureau (Scandinavian news agency) in Copenhagen. She then returned to Sweden. During her stay in Berlin, Horney had socialized with diplomats and reporters. This made intelligence officers take an interest in her. The German Horst Gilbert (born 1889) had served as an officer in the German army during the First World War; afterwards he went to the Soviet Union, where he participated in the construction of the Red Army. He also became friendly with Alexandra Kollontai. In 1934, Gilbert was mixed up in the Ernst Röhm-affair, as well as Kurt von Schleicher's attempted coup d'etat against Adolf Hitler. He was consequently imprisoned, but in 1936, transferred to Denmark as an intelligence officer. He was regarded as one of Admiral Wilhelm Canaris' men. Like the Admiral, he was supposedly involved with the 20 July plot in 1944. On 14 October 1944, Gilbert was shot down in his office in central Copenhagen by a Danish resistance group led by the former nun Ella von Cappeln. He died from his wounds one month later.

Gilbert was also suspected of being an agent for the Soviets because he, in January 1944, with Horney as a courier, succeeded in arranging a meeting with his old friend Kollontai in Stockholm. The same winter, Horney had also met Regierungsrat Ernst Züchner at Gilbert's. The two men had discussed the possibility of a separate peace between Germany and the USSR. According to Züchner, Gilbert acted on behalf of Admiral Canaris.

In Sweden, Horney had discussions with Allied intelligence personnel, such as the Special Operations Executive's Head of Danish cases, Ronald Turnbull. She also reported to Swedish intelligence staff members, Martin Lundqvist and Otto Danielsson. Danielsson considered using her further, as she "did not have moral scruples" when it came to approaching agents and pretending to be enamoured with them. When interrogated, Horney informed Säpo that she had helped Gilbert in meeting Kollontai by contacting the TASS correspondent Alexander Pavlov in Stockholm; Pavlov was an agent for the NKVD. Reportedly, she also informed the Swedish Communist Per Meurling about German troop transports along the east coast of Sweden.

According to author Jan Bergman's book, "Sekreterarklubben", from 2014 Horney actually worked for the Swedish military intelligence bureau C-byrån under the code name Eskimå. There was a vicious competition between this and the Swedish secret police, not least due to the latter's strong pro-German and part pro-Nazi tendencies. According to Bergman, the secret police deliberately gave the Danish resistance a highly one-sided and negative version of Horney and her activities.

In Stockholm, Horney was also in contact with Heinz Thorner, who in August 1944 wanted her help to get photos of German victims of Allied air raids printed in the American magazine Life. This failed, although Horney did take the photos to a flat in Rindögatan 42. In the same building, she had meetings with members of the German resistance, and here the Norwegian Kai Holst either committed suicide or was murdered in June 1945.

== Assassination ==
In the summer of 1944, "Flame" informed another member of the Danish resistance, Frode Jakobsen, that he had been ordered to assassinate a Swedish woman, Jane Horney Granberg, and asked how Jakobsen felt about that. While "Flame" did not survive the war, Jakobsen says that he replied to Flame that he had never heard of her, and so had no opinion on the matter. "Flame" attempted in vain to assassinate Horney when she visited Copenhagen in July, and in August, he left for Stockholm, hoping to succeed there. According to Jakobsen, the murder was ordered by the English, via SOE, but in Sweden "Flame" explained that the order came from Denmark. SOE's management in Stockholm reportedly prevented it, and a week later "Flame" returned to Denmark.

On 14 August 1944 the illegal paper Information printed a warning about Jane Horney, accusing her of being a spy and informant and describing her social circle. She was arrested by Swedish police on 19 September, but released after extended interrogations. At a party just after Christmas in 1944, members of the Danish resistance Sven Aage Geisler and Asbjørn Lyhne met Horney, who was attracted by Geisler's charm. Keeping her company in the following weeks, Geisler and Lyhne spent a fortune of the movement's money on the hectic Stockholm nightlife. Danes could not execute a Swedish citizen on Swedish territory. Instead, they planned to make her trust them, and then lure her into returning to Denmark to clear herself of the allegations of espionage. On 17 January 1945, she took the night train to Malmö, accompanied by Geisler, Lyhne and her friend Bodil Frederiksen (a female member of the Danish resistance who was going home, and thought the same about Horney). In Malmö, the four of them spent the night at the Grand Hotel, where Horney's assassin had checked in already. Here they were waiting for an illegal passage across Øresund. A hotel porter later told the police that he, judging from their behaviour, thought Horney and Geisler were engaged to be married. When Horney was informed that Geisler and Lyhne were not coming over to Denmark with her, she insisted on hosting a farewell dinner at the hotel, nowadays named Savoy, on the evening of 19 January. After dinner at 10 pm, Horney and Frederiksen left with the assassin in different taxis, until they reached Höganäs outside of Helsingborg. Just after midnight, they left the harbour in the fishing vessel Tärnan (the tern).

Early on the morning of 20 January Jane Horney was shot, her body entangled in iron chains and dropped in the sea. The murder was claimed to be undertaken on Swedish territory, at Laröd north of Helsingborg, while Danish authorities claim that it happened on Danish territory. Those present were probably only the captain on Tärnan and the student "Jens", later identified as Hjalmar Ravnbo, who shot her.

Most likely the Danish intelligence officer Nils Bjarke Schou ordered the murder on behalf of SOE. The historian Hans Christiansen Bjerg claims in his book Ligaen that SOE was behind the assassination, but without sufficient documentation, whereas the journalist Erik Nørgaard in his book seems to think that the initiative came from the Danes, with the British taking on the responsibility in aftertime.

== Postwar investigation ==
Horney's father reported the case to the police. On his request, the Swedish Foreign Office undertook an investigation of her death in July 1945. In July 1946, there was a meeting with, among others, the later prime minister Tage Erlander, Head of the Danish Home Office Eivind Larsen, and Frode Jakobsen. The Danes regarded it as proven that Horney had been a spy for the Germans, was liquidated as an act of war, and that this had taken place in Danish waters. Säpo however doubted that Horney had been a German agent. As prime minister, Erlander stated in 1956 that Swedish police investigations had not proven Horney to be a spy: "That does not necessarily imply that she was innocent." In the following year, the Malmö police concluded that it was not agent activity, but "love of adventure and sexual desire" which had motivated Horney to contact Germans.

At the meeting in July 1946, Frode Jakobsen presented both a written and an oral statement about the case. It was untrue in central points, and Swedish police continued their investigation well into the 1950s. In October 1947 Asbjørn Lyhne (who in May that year had been sentenced to three months of jail for the forging of documents) claimed to the police in Helsingborg to have participated in the murder. He claimed to be the one who had pretended to be Horney's boyfriend during the last two weeks ahead of the liquidation. Later however he tried to withdraw his confession. He was saved with the help of a phone call from Frode Jakobsen. In September 1983, Jakobsen explained about the phone call to the newspaper B.T. According to Jakobsen, Swedish police did not let Lyhne go until Jakobsen had assured them that the confession was "just bragging". Afterwards, he had enjoined on Lyhne that he would be unable to help him a second time. About Geisler and Lyhne he stated that they were not "someone one wanted to have involved". Lyhne explained Jakobsen's helpfulness by claiming that he "knew something" about Jakobsen. In September 1948, Sven Aage Geisler was arrested in Malmö, suspected of the murder, but he denied this. Geisler was found killed in Denmark in November 1968.

== Rumoured survival ==
Some contend that Horney was not killed, but was replaced by her friend Bodil Frederiksen, who was killed in her place. Under this theory, Horney was taken to England, where she became a spy in service of the British intelligence during the Cold War, and died on 3 April 2003, but this is not confirmed or considered to be likely, as Bodil Frederiksen is known to have lived until 1963. No documentation exists to prove that Horney was alive after January 1945. All documentation stating otherwise has been revealed as falsified.

An alternative theory is that her 1945 death was falsified as a deception prior to her involvement in the smuggling of Danish Princess Margrethe and another royal family member to safety in Sweden. This same source claims that Jane Horney is a pseudonym; she was actually named Janina Radziwill-Hamilton, daughter of Major Count Michael Jacek Radziwill-Hamilton. This version states that she died on 3 April 2003 in London of a heart attack at the age of 84 years.

== In culture ==
Jane Horney was the subject of a 1985 TV series by Lars Simonsen.

== See also ==
- Erika Wendt
- Karin Lannby

== Sources ==
- Flammen og Citronen – modstandsfolk og myter (on dk). Nationalmuseet, Copenhagen. Nationalmuseet – Flammen og Citronen. Read 25 October 2008.
- Lennart W. Frick; Lars Rosander: Bakom hemligstämpeln, Historiska Media, 2004, page 120, ISBN 978-91-85057-11-5.
- Svenskt biografiskt lexikon, book 19.
- Därför mördades Jane Horney
- Jane Horney by Erik Nørgaard, edited by Gyldendal, 2007, ISBN 978-87-02-05698-3
- René Rasmussen: En Pufedorf affære, Para-nyt (2007)
