= Thede Palm =

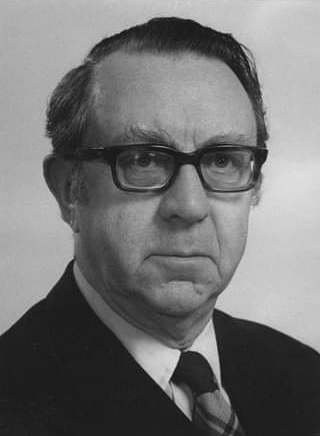
- Born: Carl Theodor Palm; 27 September 1907; Sala, Sweden
- Died: 18 February 1995 (aged 87); Östra Ryd, Sweden
- Education: Lund University
- Occupations: Intelligence chief, historian
- Years active: 1928–1972
- Known for: Head of T-kontoret
- Spouse: Elisabeth Wrangel (m. 1933)
- Children: 4

Carl Theodor (Thede) Palm (27 September 1907 – 18 February 1995) was a Swedish historian of religion, director of research and head of military intelligence.

== Early life ==
Palm was born on 27 September 1907 in Sala, Sweden, the son of Major Axel Palm and his wife Ebba (née Nordenfelt). He received a Bachelor of Arts degree from Lund University in 1928, a Licentiate of Philosophy degree in 1933 and a Doctor of Philosophy in 1937. His PhD research was on ancient Slavic cult places in Northern Germany.

== Career ==
Palm was employed at Svensk uppslagsbok from 1928 to 1936 and became a teaching assistant in 1933 (temporary staff in 1932). He was librarian at the Lund University Library from 1938 to 1956 and he was head of department at the Swedish National Board of Information (Statens Informationsstyrelse) from 1943 to 1944 as well as being an expert there in 1945.

In 1943, Palm put in a request for a leave of absence to operate under Carl Petersén at C-byrån, a secret intelligence organization within the Swedish Armed Forces during World War II. C-byrån's duty was to manage foreign intelligence gathering. He became director of operations in 1946 and it changed its name to T-kontoret. During the Cold War he was one of the heads of the Swedish stay-behind organization. In his posthumous notes he tells how he was subjected to American pressure that the Swedish intelligence service should be practically under direct CIA command, which Palm firmly resisted.

In 1965 the foreign-oriented T-kontoret was merged with the domestic-oriented B-kontoret (B-office) and became the Defence Staff's Special Bureau (Försvarsstabens särskilda byrå), more commonly known as IB. The head of B-kontoret, Birger Elmér, took over as director of the merged organization. Palm was fired and transferred to the Swedish Armed Forces Staff College, where he was director of research from 1965 to 1972.

Palm became a member of the Royal Society of Arts and Sciences of Uppsala in 1976 (corresponding member in 1962) and of the Royal Swedish Academy of War Sciences in 1969. He wrote articles in Svenska Dagbladet from 1965 and was the co-editor of Svensk Tidskrift from 1967 to 1979.

== Personal life ==
In 1933, he married Elisabeth Wrangel (1905–2001), the daughter of Professor Ewert Wrangel and Baroness Ingrid (née Hermelin). They had four children: Anders (born 1933), Ebba (born 1936), Hedvig (born 1938), and Brita (born 1942). Palm and his wife settled in Östra Ryd in Söderköping Municipality when he retired.

== Death ==
Palm died on 18 February 1995 and was buried in Östra Ryd's cemetery.

== Awards and decorations ==
- (Sweden) Knight of the Order of the Polar Star
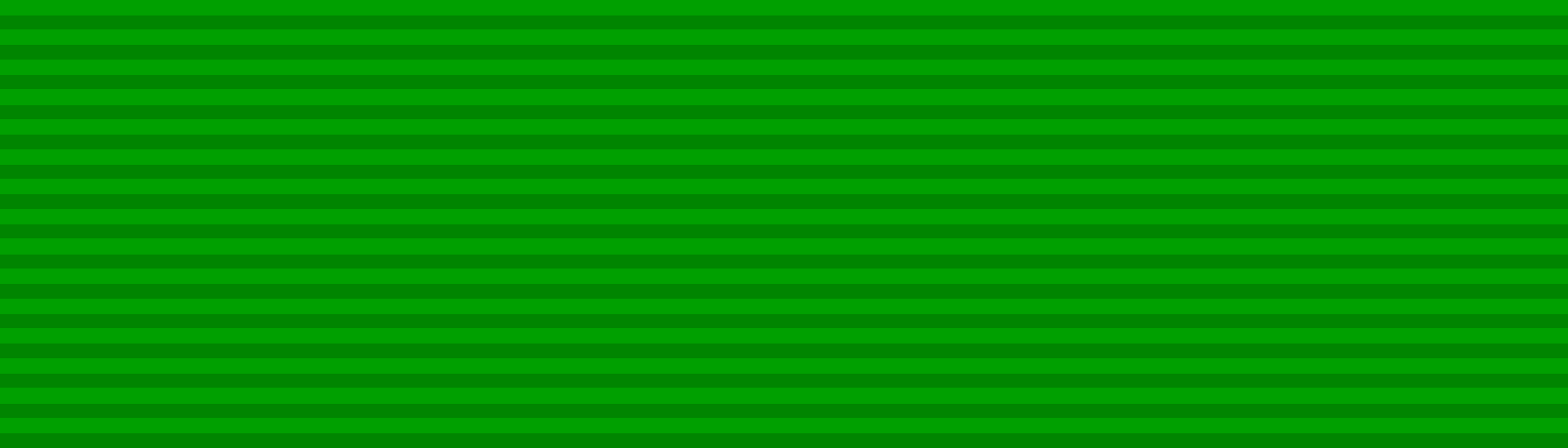
- (Sweden) Knight of the Order of Vasa
- (Norway) Commander of the Order of St. Olav (1961)
- (France) Officer of the Legion of Honour
- (Norway) King Haakon VII Freedom Cross

== Bibliography ==
- Palm, Thede (1937). Wendische Kultstätten: quellenkritische Untersuchungen zu den letzten Jahrhunderten slavischen Heidentums (in German). Lund. SELIBR 394442.
- Palm, Thede (1938). Bidrag till en bibliografi över professor Hjalmar Holmquists tryckta skrifter (in Swedish). Lund. SELIBR 3061951.
- Palm, Thede (1942). Uppsalalunden och Uppsalatemplet (in Swedish). Lund. SELIBR 1298690.
- Palm, Thede (1944). Kommunistpressen och krigsmakten (in Swedish). Stockholm. SELIBR 2444582.
- Palm, Thede (1948). Trädkult: studier i germansk religionshistoria. Skrifter utgivna av Vetenskapssocieteten i Lund, 0347-1772; 33 (in Swedish). Lund: Gleerup. SELIBR 383752.
- Palm, Thede (1971). The Finnish-Soviet armistice negotiations of 1944. Acta Academiae Regiae scientiarum Upsaliensis, 0505-3935; 14. Uppsala: Almqvist & Wiksell. SELIBR 433769.
- Palm, Thede; Enckell, Georg (1972). Vägen till vapenvila: de finländsk-sovjetiska vapenstilleståndsförhandlingarna 1944 [The road to armistice: The Finnish-Soviet armistice negotiations of 1944]. [Militärlitteraturföreningen]; [253] (in Swedish). Ekenäs. ISBN 951-9000-05-4. SELIBR 7982833.
- Palm, Thede (1976). Fältmarskalkens död och andra essäer. Militärlitteraturföreningen, 99-0119708-2; 258 (in Swedish). Stockholm: Militärhistoriska förl. ISBN 91-85266-05-1. SELIBR 7747320.
- Palm, Thede (1981). Nederlagets män och andra essäer (in Swedish). Stockholm: Militärhistoriska förlaget. ISBN 91-85266-19-1. SELIBR 7747330.
- Palm, Thede (1984). De vita och de röda och andra essäer (in Swedish). Stockholm: Militärhistoriska förl. ISBN 91-85266-31-0. SELIBR 7747341.
- Palm, Thede (1987). Historia kring en kyrka (in Swedish). Söderköping: Söderköpings bokh. ISBN 91-7810-848-9. SELIBR 7667266.
- Palm, Thede (1988). Motstånd och motståndsrörelser (in Swedish). Stockholm: Militärhistoriska förl. ISBN 91-85266-43-4. SELIBR 7747350.
- Palm, Thede; Wallberg, Evabritta (1999). Några studier till T-kontorets historia. Handlingar / Kungl. Samfundet för utgivande av handskrifter rörande Skandinaviens historia, 0347-8505; 21 (in Swedish). Stockholm: Kungl. Samf. för utgivande av handskrifter rörande Skandinaviens historia. ISBN 91-85104-24-8. SELIBR 7745565.
