= Axel Törneman =

Swedish painter (1880–1925)

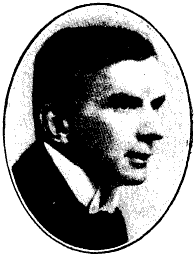
- Axel Törneman, in Nordisk familjebok
- Born: Johan Axel Gustaf Törneman; 28 October 1880; Persberg, Värmland, Sweden
- Died: 26 December 1925 (aged 45); Stockholm, Sweden
- Education: Värmland School of Art, Kunstakademie München, Adolf Hölzel, Académie Julian
- Known for: Modern art, Painting; graphic design
- Movement: Modernism, Expressionism
- Spouse: Gudrun Høyer-Ellefsen

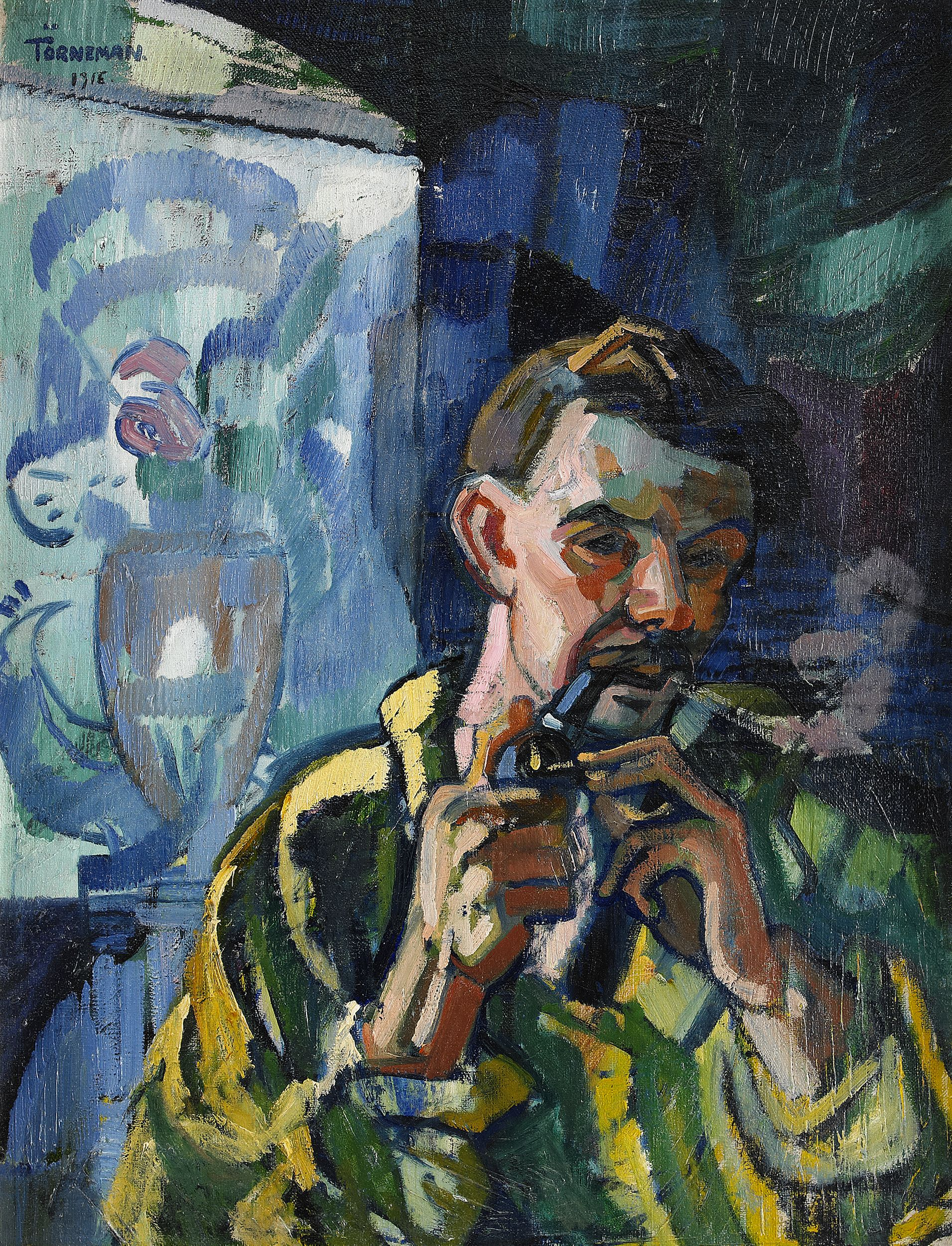
Självporträtt med pipa (self-portrait with pipe), 1916

Johan Axel Gustaf Törneman (28 October 1880 – 26 December 1925) was one of Sweden's earliest modernist painters. Born in Persberg, Värmland, in Sweden, he grew to work in several modernist styles, was one of the first Swedish expressionist artists, and became a part of the international avant-garde in art after embracing more abstract art styles in Germany and France that were evolving there during the early 1900s. He created his most famous paintings, Night Café I and II, and Trait, in France in 1905. These night café paintings, made from studies in the Place Pigalle, and in other nightclubs popular with artists such as Café du Rat Mort (Dead Rat Café), are seen as two of Swedish modernism's most important works, and are considered breakthrough work of Swedish modernism.

Törneman gained international stature in 1905 at the Salon d'Automne in Paris with Trait I, and with his Narragansett Café in 1906. He went on to paint murals and decorations in public buildings such as the Royal Institute of Technology (KTH) and Stockholm City Hall, and other Stockholm buildings such as Norra Latin, Ragnar Östberg's Östermalms läroverkl, and the second chamber in the Parliament House. Törneman's paintings were recognized with a gold medal at the U.S. Panama–Pacific International Exposition, in San Francisco in 1915. Törneman died in Stockholm at age 45 after only a further decade of creative work.

== Education, travel, and early work ==
Johan Axel Gustaf Törneman was born on 28 October 1880 in Persberg, Värmland Sweden, the son of John Algot Törneman, an engineer at an explosives factory; his grandmother was the cookbook author Gustafva Bjorklund.

Törneman studied at Värmland School of Art in Gothenburg in 1899 under Carl Wilhelmson, then toured the Nordic lands for a short while before traveling to study on the European continent in the years 1900–1905. In Europe, he first studied at the Kunstakademie München (now the Akademie der Bildenden Künste München), then went to Dachau to study under Adolf Hölzel. In Munich he was influenced by the Art Nouveau movement and symbolism, Arnold Böcklin, Franz Stuck, and others.

Törneman grew to work in several modernist styles, was one of the first Swedish expressionist artists, and became a part of the international avant-garde in art after having embraced the then-new, more abstract art style in Germany and France during the early 1900s.

== Career in France and Sweden ==
After leaving Germany, Törneman was active in Paris for four years, and also in the Breton village of Coudeville, Brittany. In Paris he studied at the Académie Julian, where after seeing van Gogh's and Gauguin's work, he brightened his palette. During his time in Paris, Törneman's friends were able to locate him by following the sketches he left in Paris cafés.

Törneman had a small studio in Paris at 7 rue de Bagneux. His night café paintings, based on studies in Place Pigalle, and a Paris nightclub popular with artists, Café du Rat Mort (Dead Rat Café), are two of Swedish modernism's most important works, though Törneman was less influenced by the French modernists than by the Germans. Three of these, his most famous paintings, Night Café I and II, and Trait, he painted in 1905 while in France. Törneman gained international stature in that same year, in the Salon d'Automne in Paris, for Trait I, and for Narragansett Café in 1906.

Returning from the continent, he moved to Stockholm, to Katarinavägen, next door to the studio of main competitor and critic of his work, Isaac Grünewald. Although another of his studios (on Södermalm in Stockholm) was in the same building as the sculptor and fellow Värmlander Christian Eriksson, he did not work with Eriksson's group at the Rackstad colony in Arvika. Some of Törneman's contemporaries included Sigrid Hjertén (1885–1948), Gösta Von Hennigs (1866–1941) and Leander Engström (1886–1927).

Törneman was recognized with a gold medal at the U.S. Panama–Pacific International Exposition, in San Francisco in 1915. Törneman traveled intermittently in relation to his art (e.g., in 1912, to Venice), and toward the end of his life, he largely abandoned his early dark palette, and instead worked almost entirely in the brighter colors from his Paris days.

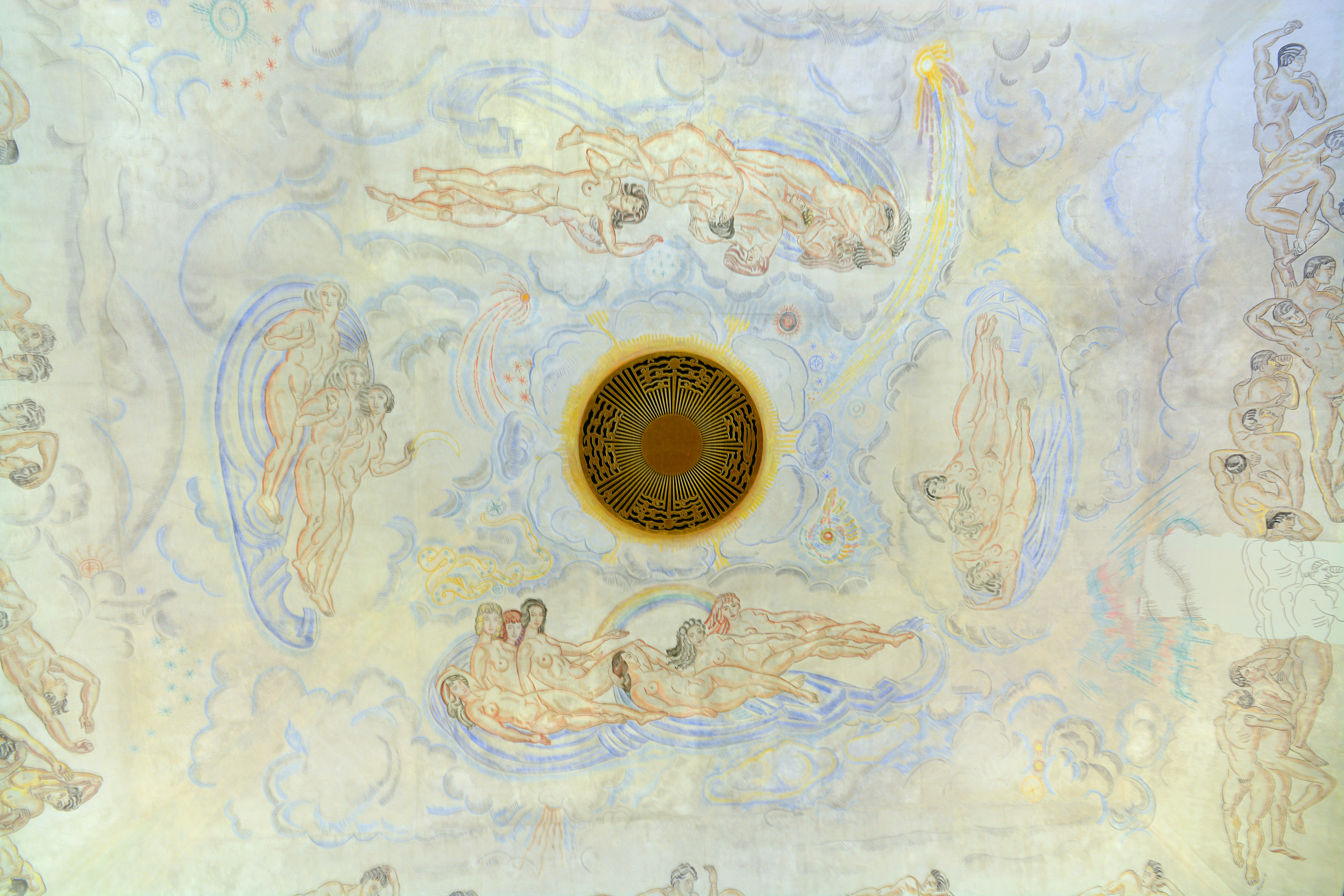
De elektriska strömmarna in the ceiling of lecture hall E1, KTH, Stockholm. The ventilation duct has been fitted with a suitable ventilator.

== Mural work ==
In addition to his many paintings on canvas, at various times in his career Törneman produced illustrations for commercial projects, as well as painting frescos and large scale murals in public spaces, such as the Royal Institute of Technology (KTH), Stockholm City Hall, other Stockholm buildings such as Norra Latin, Östermalms läroverk, Östra Real, and the second chamber of the Parliament House. Törneman began the ceiling mural De elektriska strömmarna (The electric currents), in 1918 in a lecture hall of the KTH. This very ambitions painting project was a subject of much discussion, and when completed was unanimously praised by critics, but disappeared from view until its rediscovery.

During the 1950s, the ceiling painting De elektriska disappeared, having been hidden behind a new ceiling during a renovation; with time, speculation arose that it had been destroyed during construction at its KTH site. After nearly 40 years, and its being near forgotten, De elektriska was found during 1993 repairs to its original building, intact, though a ventilation duct had been installed through it. The painting, still considered an important part of Swedish cultural heritage, was restored and moved—a thin layer of it was removed with great care and affixed to a new support in its new location—work that took a year and cost five-times as much as commission for the original artwork; it re-opened to the public in its new location, in 1994.

== Personal life ==
Törneman married the Norwegian chanteuse Gudrun Høyer-Ellefsen (1875-1963), whom he had met in Paris during his time there, in 1908. His son Algot Törneman, later became an artist in his own right, and it was he who Törneman pictured in his 1921 painting Algot med teddybjörn (Algot with teddybear). Axel Törneman died in Stockholm at 45, after several hospitalizations, from gastrointestinal causes (assigned at the time as bleeding ulcers).

== Legacy ==
Törneman has been referred to as "[o]ne of the most important pioneers of Swedish art". Törneman's letters, some sketchbooks, paintings, and some of his personal belongings are preserved at the Kungliga biblioteket ("Royal Library"), in the National Library of Sweden, in Stockholm.

In 1965 the Moderna Museet, in Stockholm ("Modern Museum", a museum of modern art) held a major retrospective exhibition of his work, 40 years after his death.

== Selected works ==
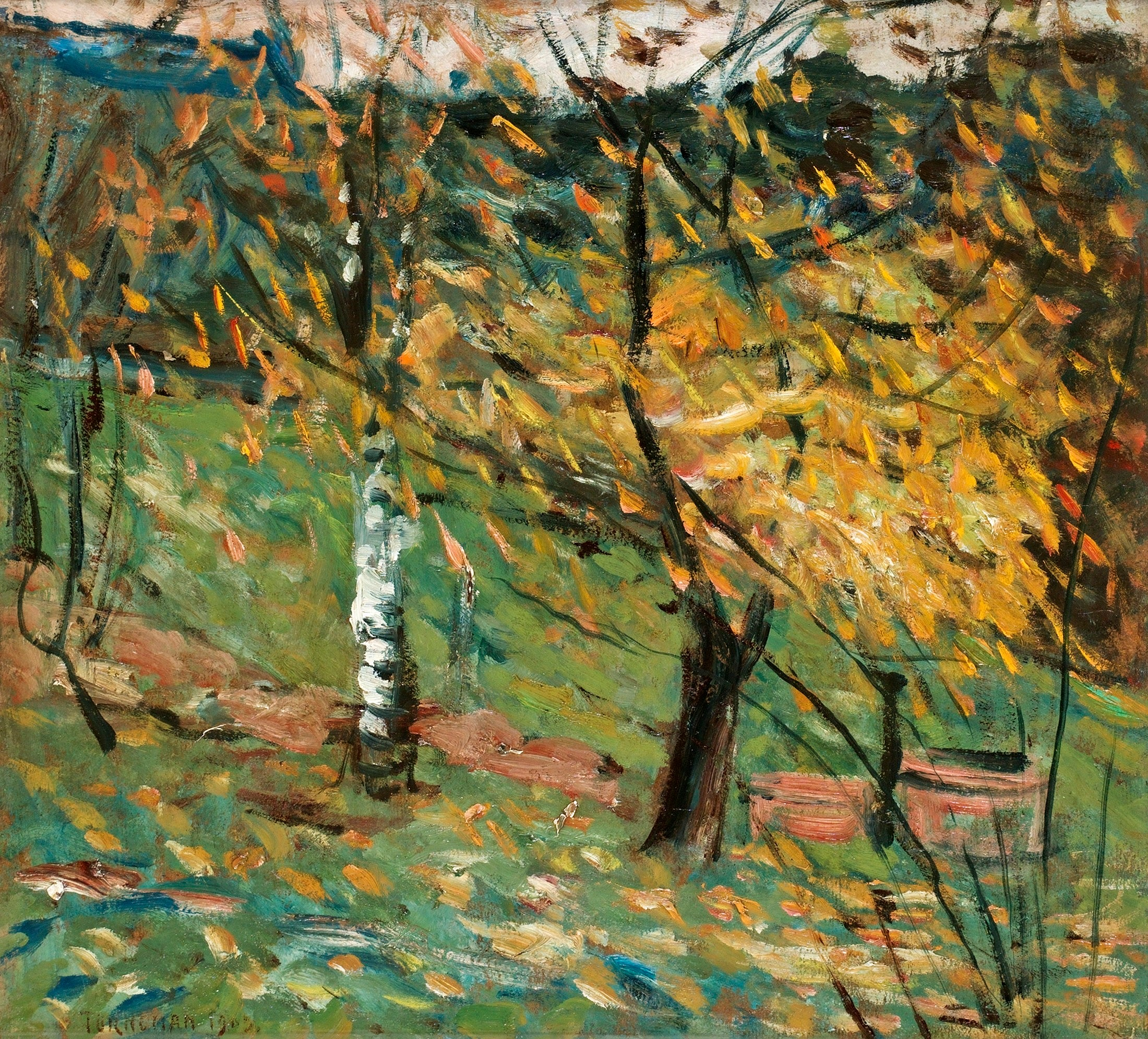
Den vita björken, 1902
(The White Birch)

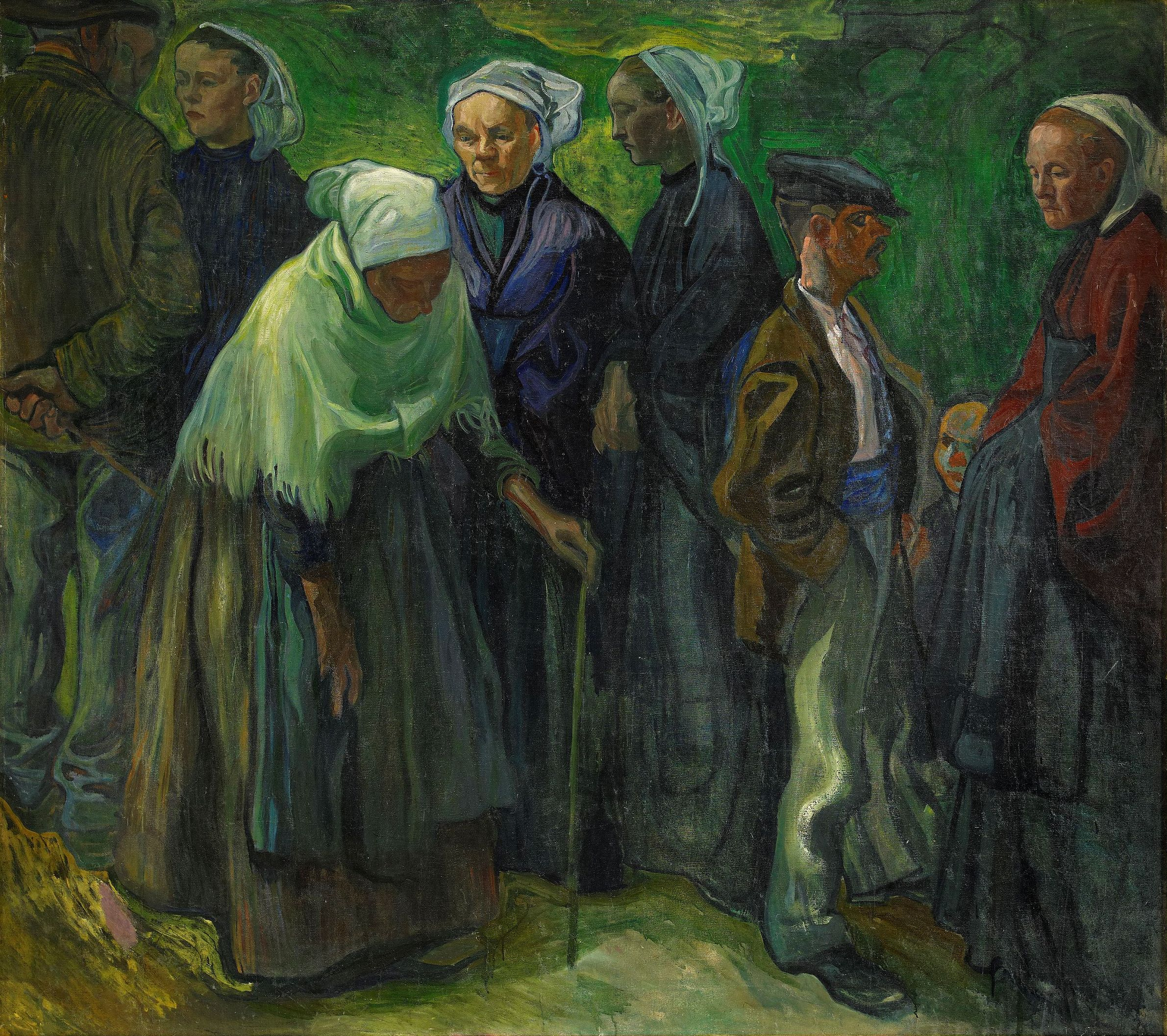
Bretagnare I, 1905
(Bretons I)

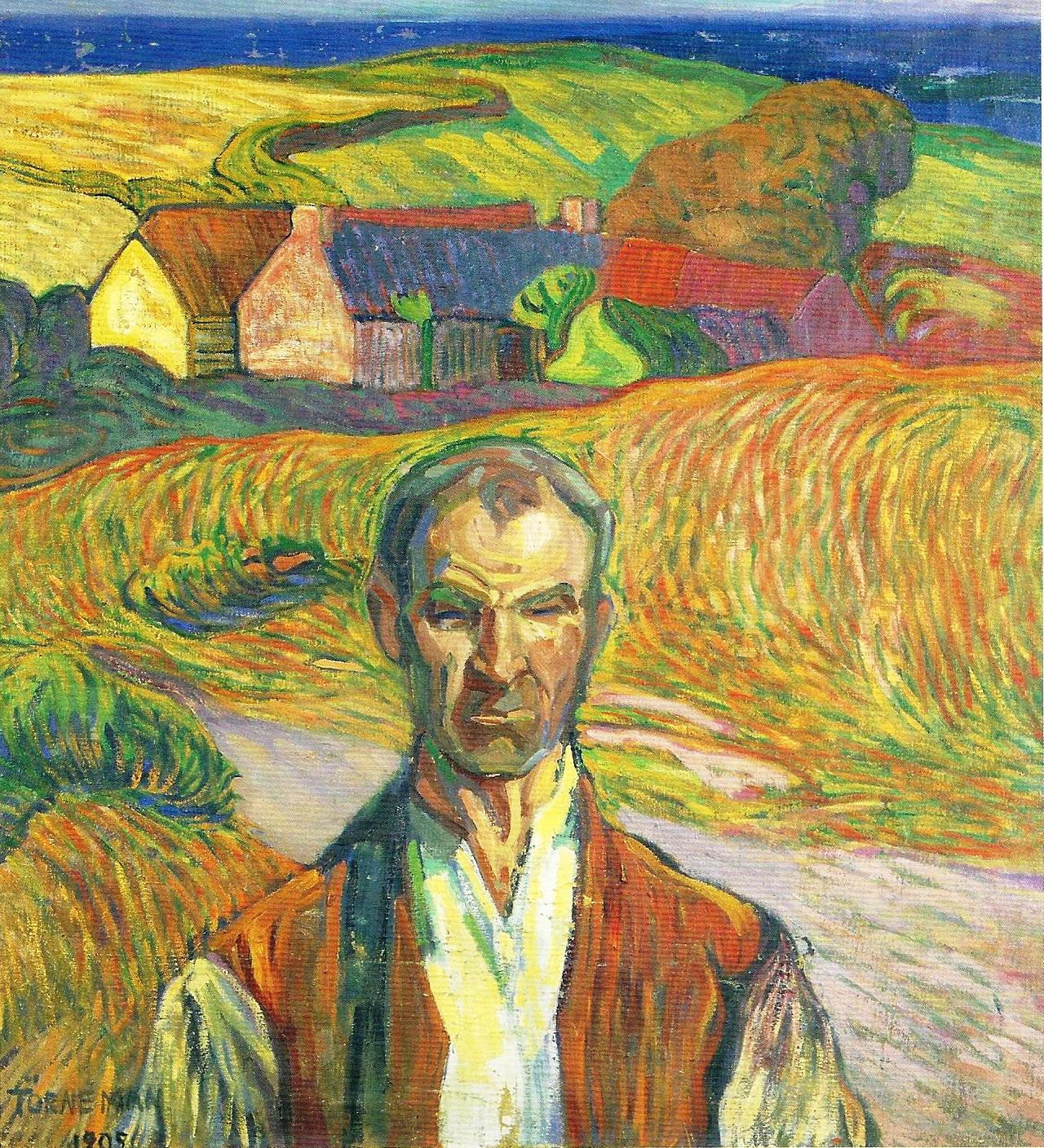
Bonden i Bretagne, 1905
(Farmer in Brittany)

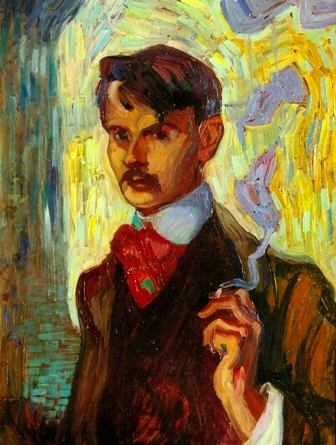
Självporträtt, 1905
(Self-portrait)

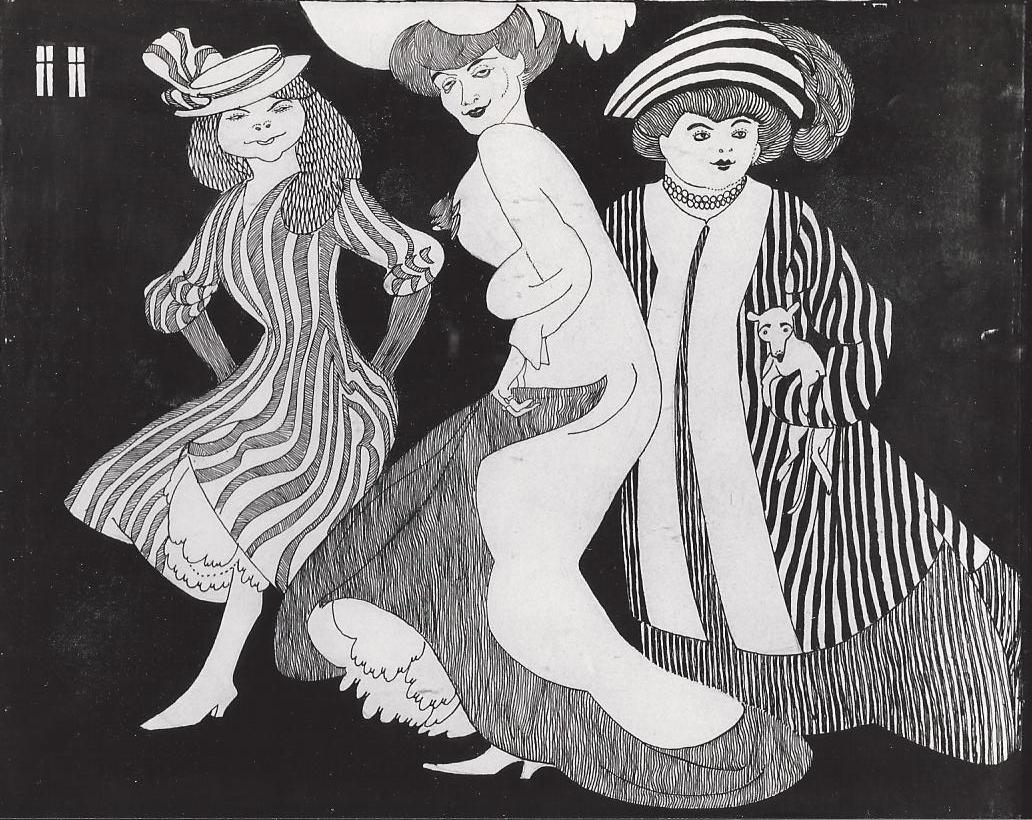
Kokotter, 1905
(Coquettes)

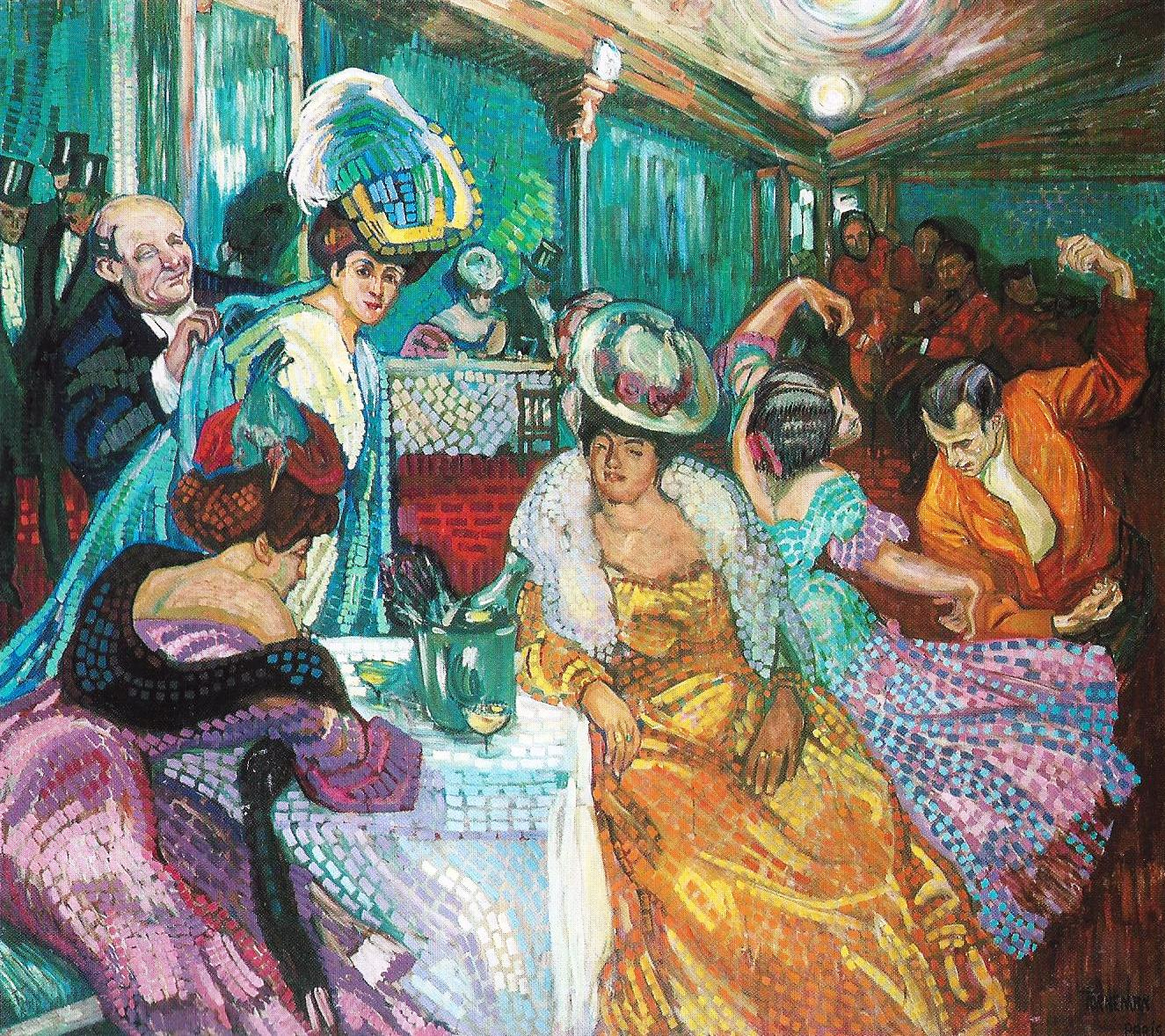
Nattcafé I, 1905–1906
(Night Café I)

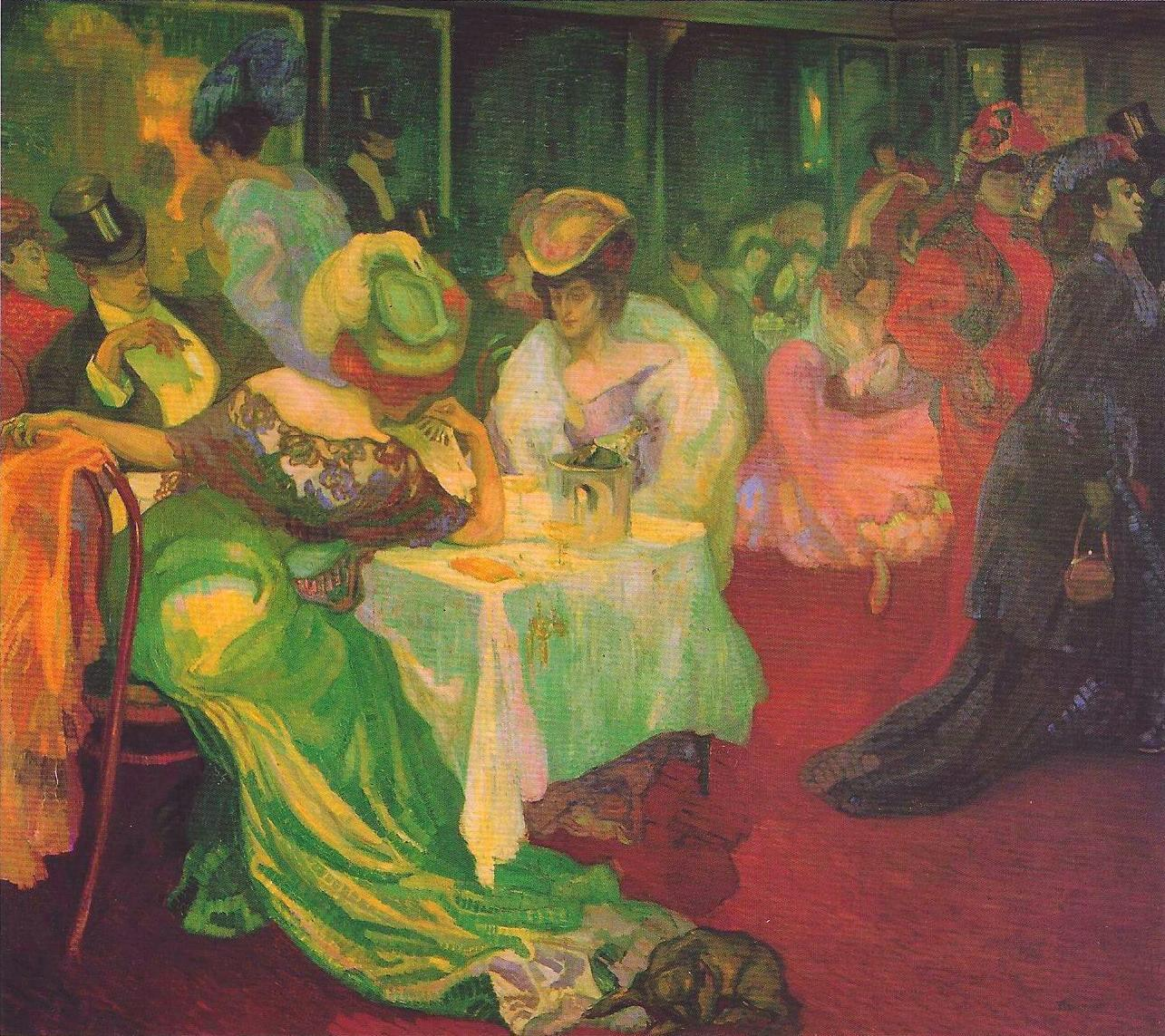
Nattcafé II, 1906
(Night Café II)

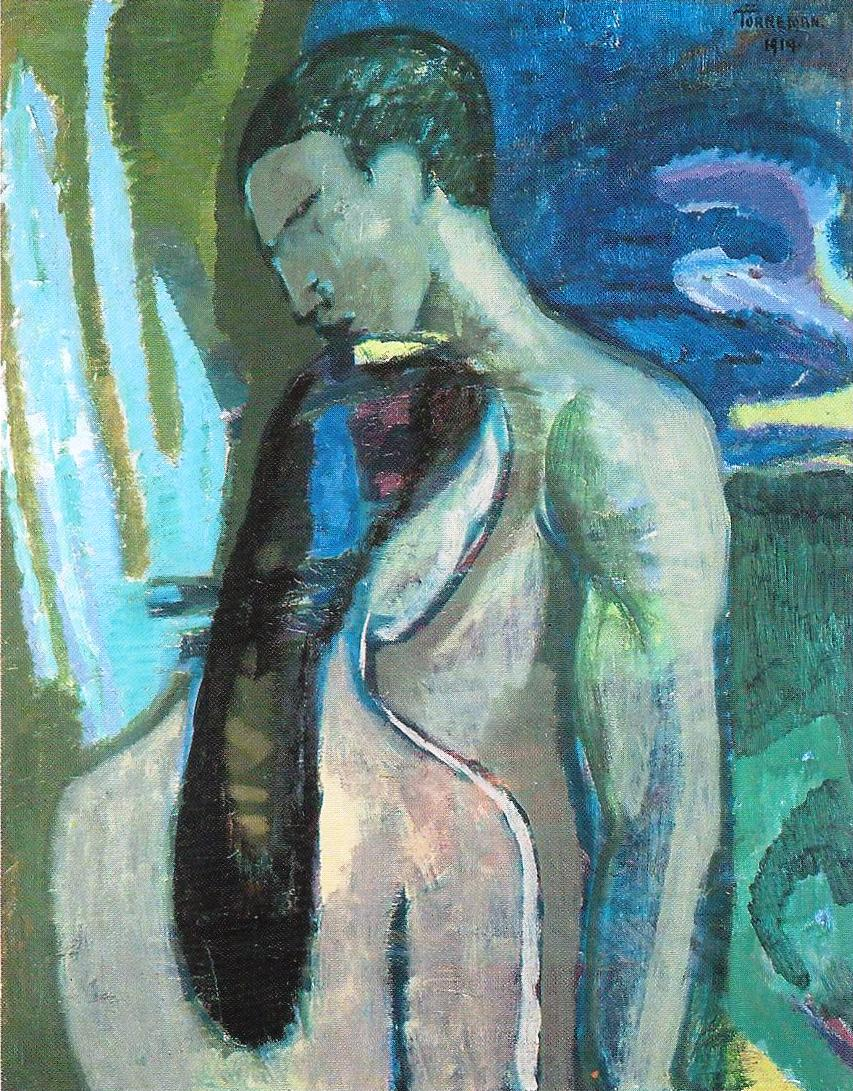
Ungdom, 1919
(Youth)

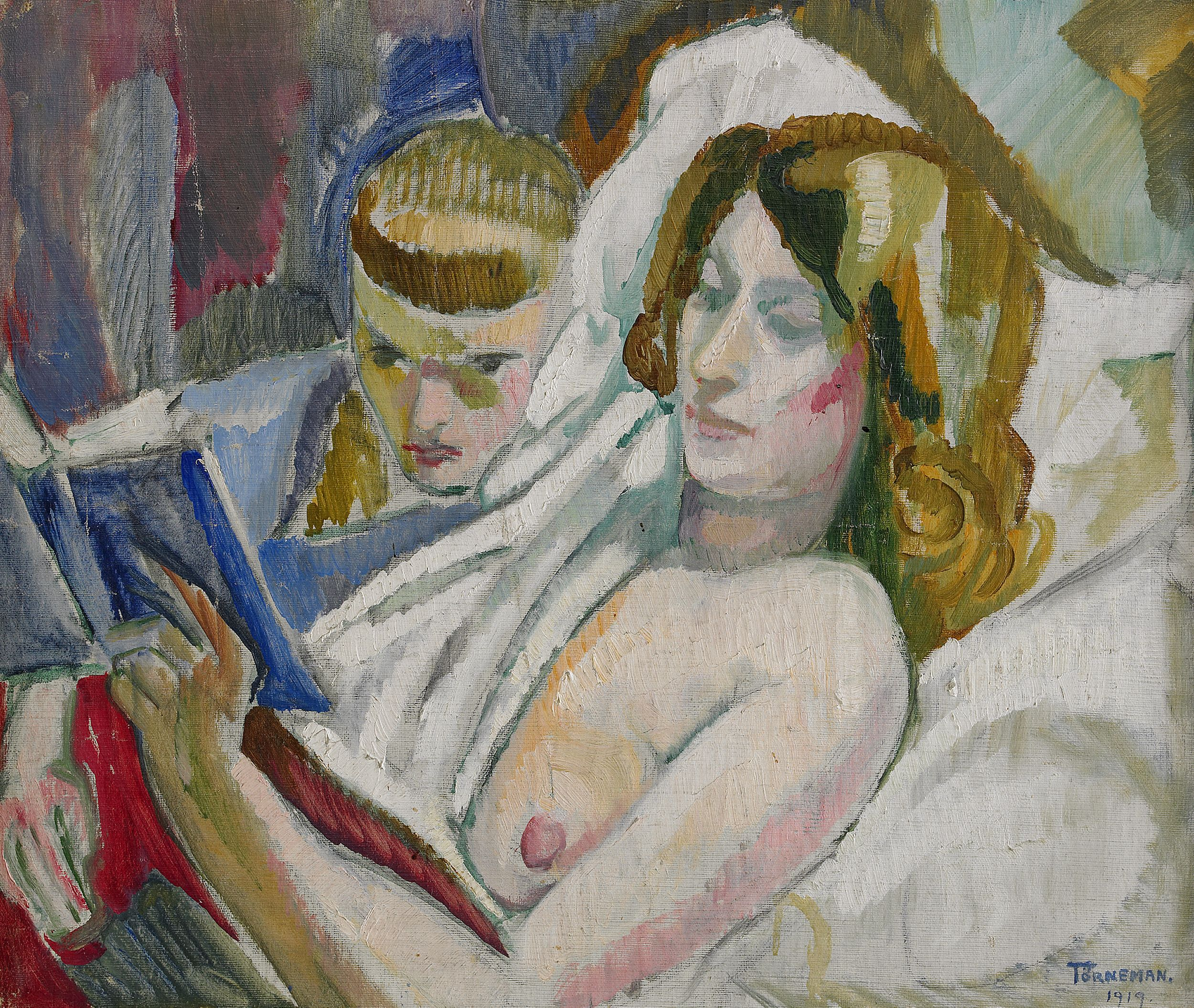
Sagostund, 1919
(Storytime)

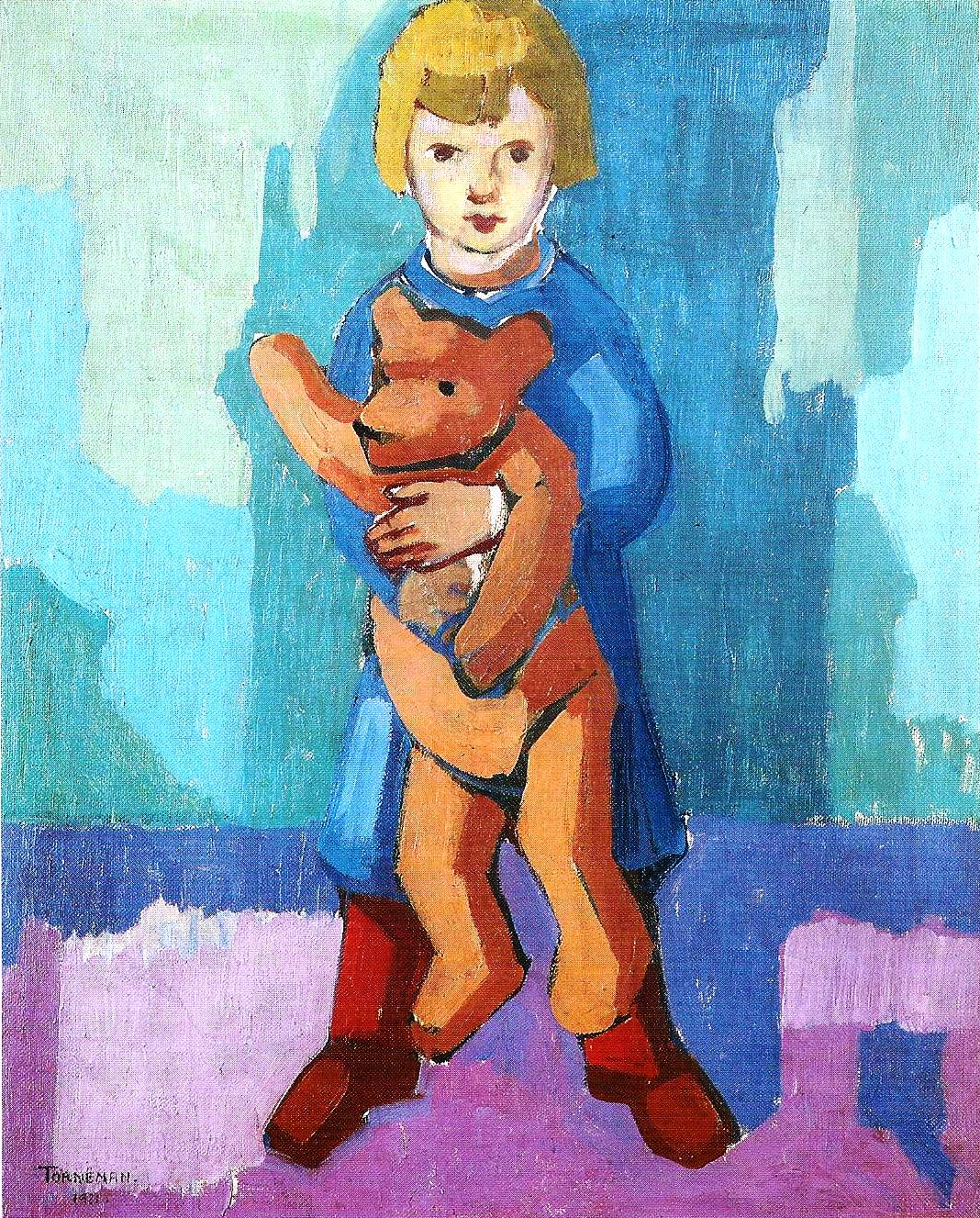
Algot med teddybjörn, 1921
(Algot with teddybear)

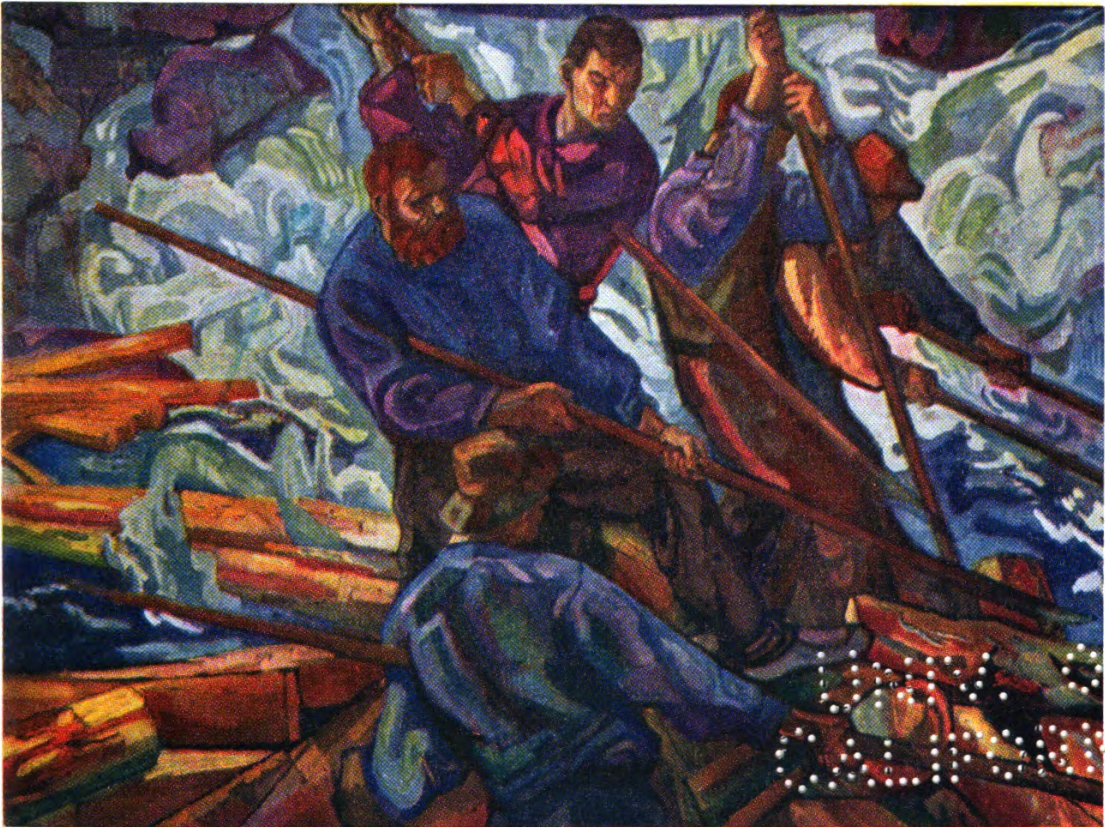
Timmerflottare, 1921
(Timber floaters)

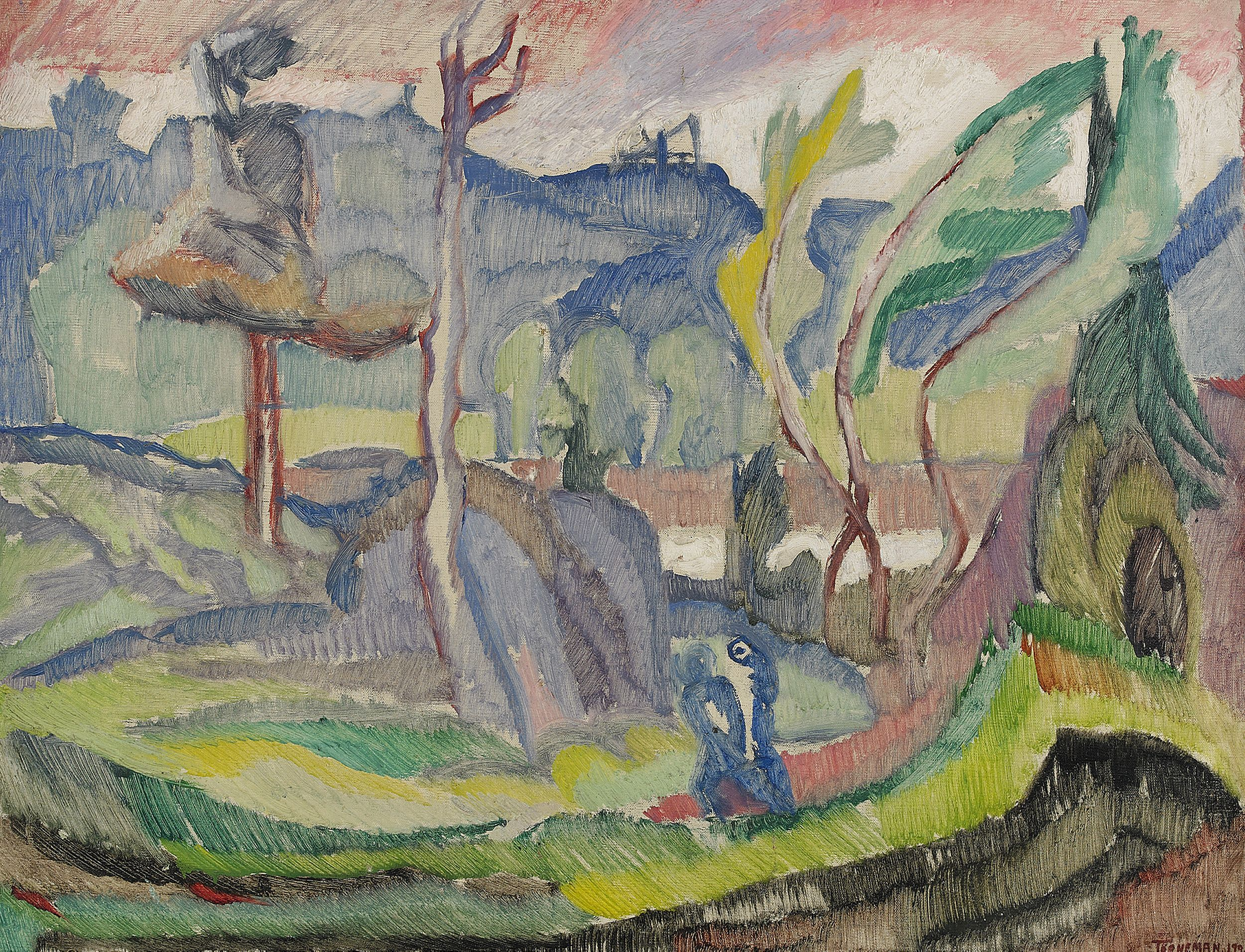
Skuggor, 1925
(Shadows)

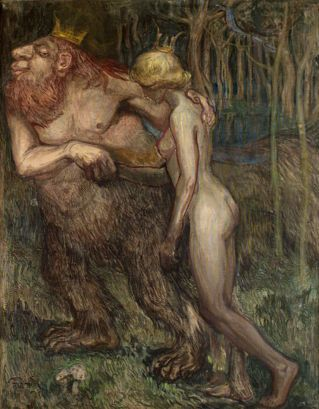
Trollkungen och prinsessan, 1925
(The Troll King and the Princess)

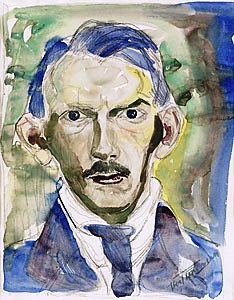
Självporträtt (watercolour)
(Self-portrait)

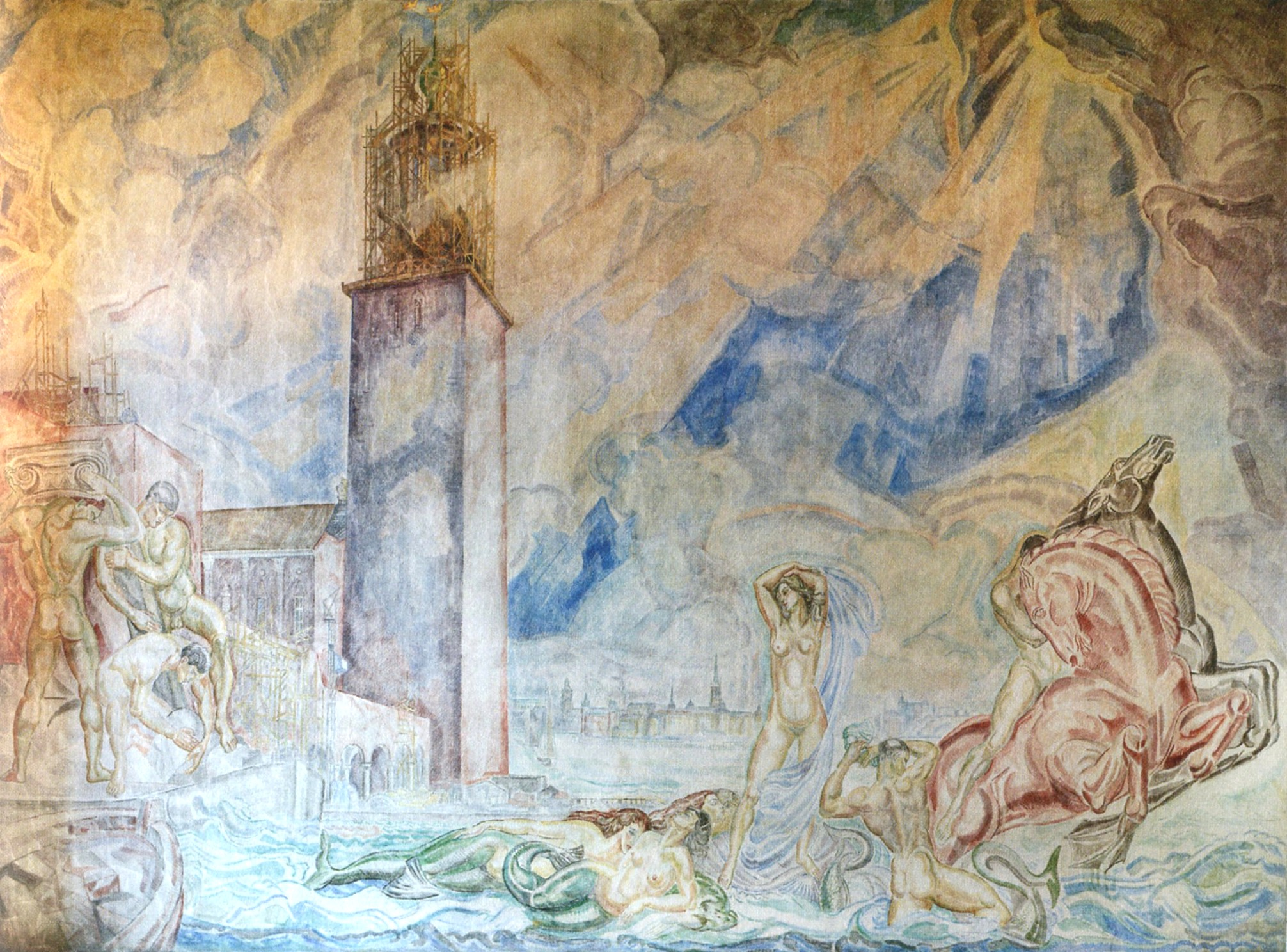
Stadshuset bygges, kalkmålning i "Blåa rummet" intill Gyllene salen
(City Hall is Built, Stockholm City Hall, fresco in the "Blue Room" next to the Golden Hall)

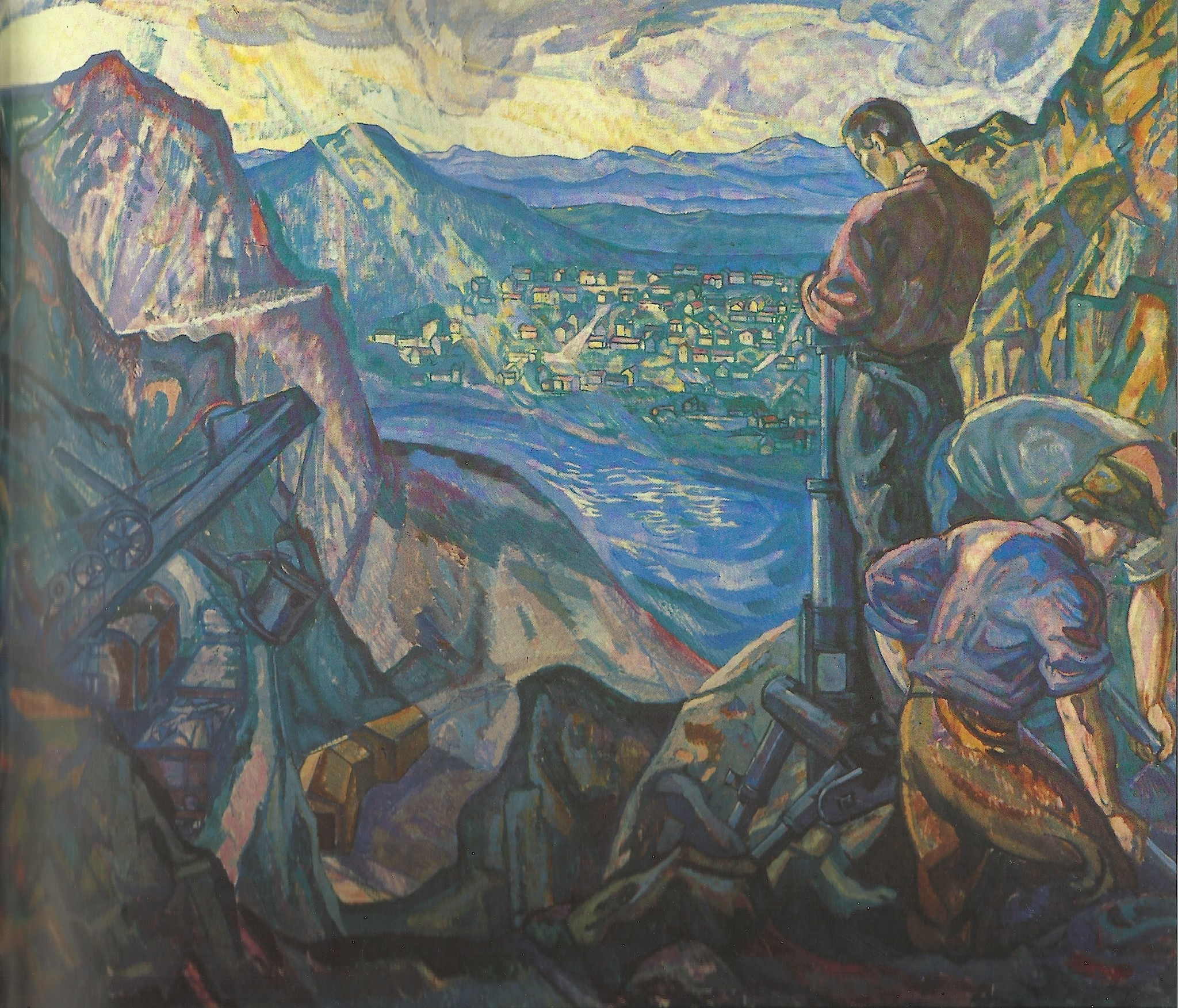
Verk i Kiruna
(Work in Kiruna City Hall)

== See also ==
- Moderna Museet
- Blue Room in Stockholm City Hall
- Kiruna City Hall
- Swedish art
- List of Swedish artists
- Swedish language Wikipedia
- Nationalencyklopedin
