= C-byrån =

Swedish secret intelligence agency

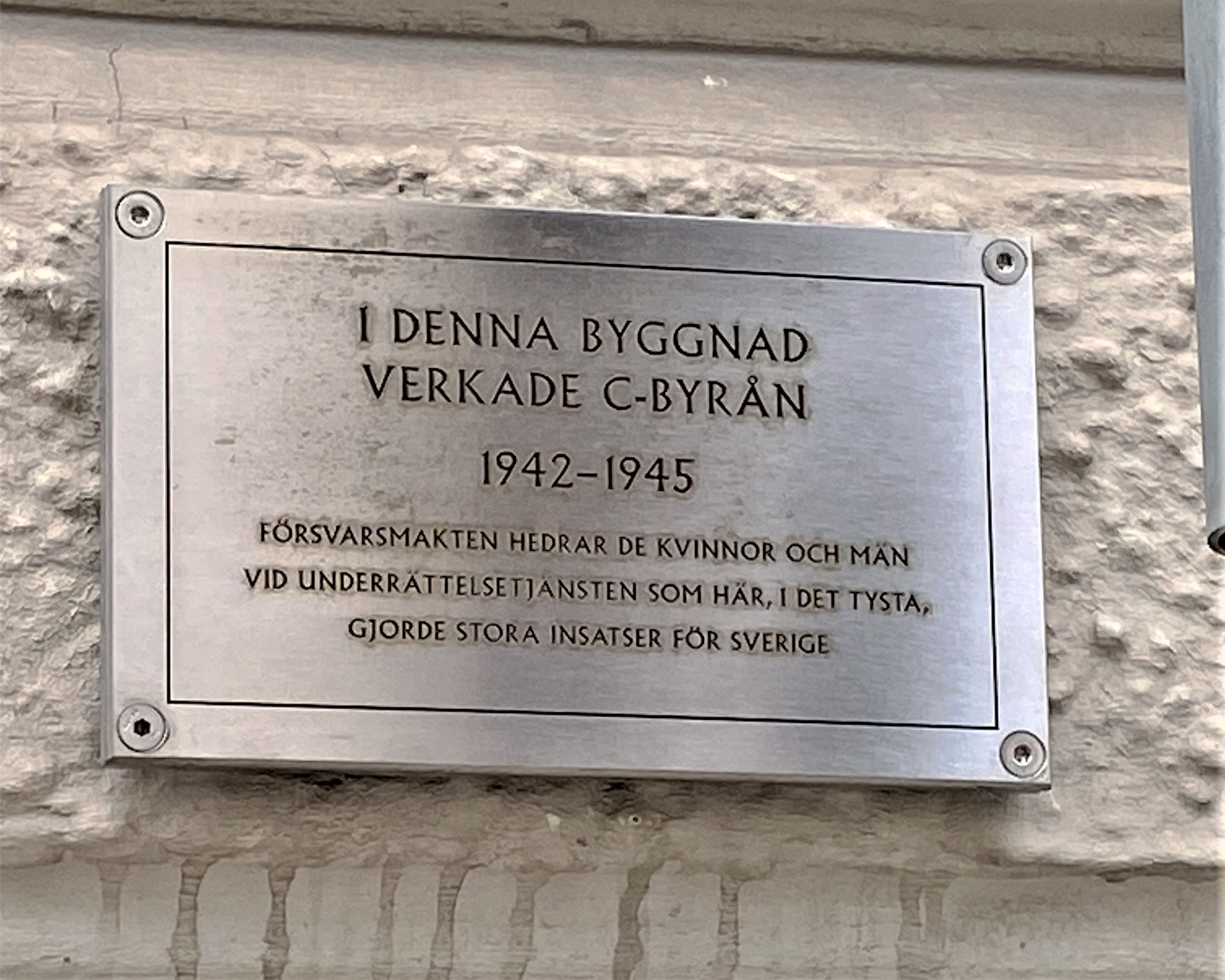
Plaque on Sibyllegatan 49 in Stockholm: "C-byrån operated in this building 1942-1945. The Swedish Armed Forces honor the women and men in the intelligence service who here, in silence, made great efforts for Sweden."

C-byrån ("C bureau") was a Swedish secret intelligence agency established in 1939 under the Swedish Armed Forces. It was headed by Major Carl Petersén. During World War II, C-byrån organized intelligence operations in German-occupied Norway and participated in Operation Stella Polaris in Finland.

== History ==
When World War II broke out in 1939, Sweden lacked a modern military intelligence service. Major Carl Petersén was tasked with establishing one. C-byrån (known as G-sektionen until 1942) was founded a few months after the outbreak of the war following a joint initiative by the Supreme Commander, General Olof Thörnell, and the head of the Defence Staff's Intelligence Department, Colonel Carlos Adlercreutz.

Carl Petersén and his deputy, Helmuth Ternberg, shared responsibility for intelligence-gathering operations. Petersén focused on obtaining information from the Allied powers, while Ternberg concentrated on Finland, Germany, Hungary, and Switzerland. According to Ternberg, his primary source of information was Wilhelm Canaris, head of the German Abwehr. Ternberg was generally sympathetic to Germany but was not a Nazi supporter. He was, however, deeply conservative and nationalist. Like Petersén, he was regarded as an adventurer.

One of the first people recruited to the agency was Gunnar Jarring, who was responsible for attracting as many academics as possible to the organization, an effort that began in earnest in 1942. One such recruit was Thede Palm, who held a PhD and was a friend of future Prime Minister Tage Erlander from their time at Lund University. Ternberg maintained close contacts with Wilhelm Canaris and the Abwehr's Stockholm branch, the so-called Wagner Agency. He also recruited one of its employees, Erika Schwarze, as a secret agent working against the Germans on behalf of Sweden.

Other individuals associated with C-byrån included the art historian Stig Roth and the artist Algot Törneman. By the end of World War II, 149 people were listed as serving in C-byrån. The agency was headquartered in an apartment at Sibyllegatan 49 in Stockholm, in a building known as Centralen.

In 1946, C-byrån was dissolved, and both Petersén and Ternberg were forced to leave their positions. The agency ceased operations following allegations of irregularities, although these allegations were never proven. Its activities were investigated by the so-called C-byrån Investigation (C-byråutredningen), led by Judge Erik Tammelin.

The successor organization, T-kontoret ("T Office"), was established in 1946 under the leadership of Thede Palm and continued many of C-byrån's activities. In 1967, Palm transferred C-byrån's archives to the Military Archives. According to Palm, the archives had been heavily purged by that time. For example, records concerning both Swedish and foreign individuals who had participated in or come into contact with the agency's operations had been destroyed. This account was later confirmed by other former C-byrån employees.

== See also ==
- KSI
- T-kontoret
- IB affair
