= Stig Roth =

Swedish art historian, museum curator and museum director

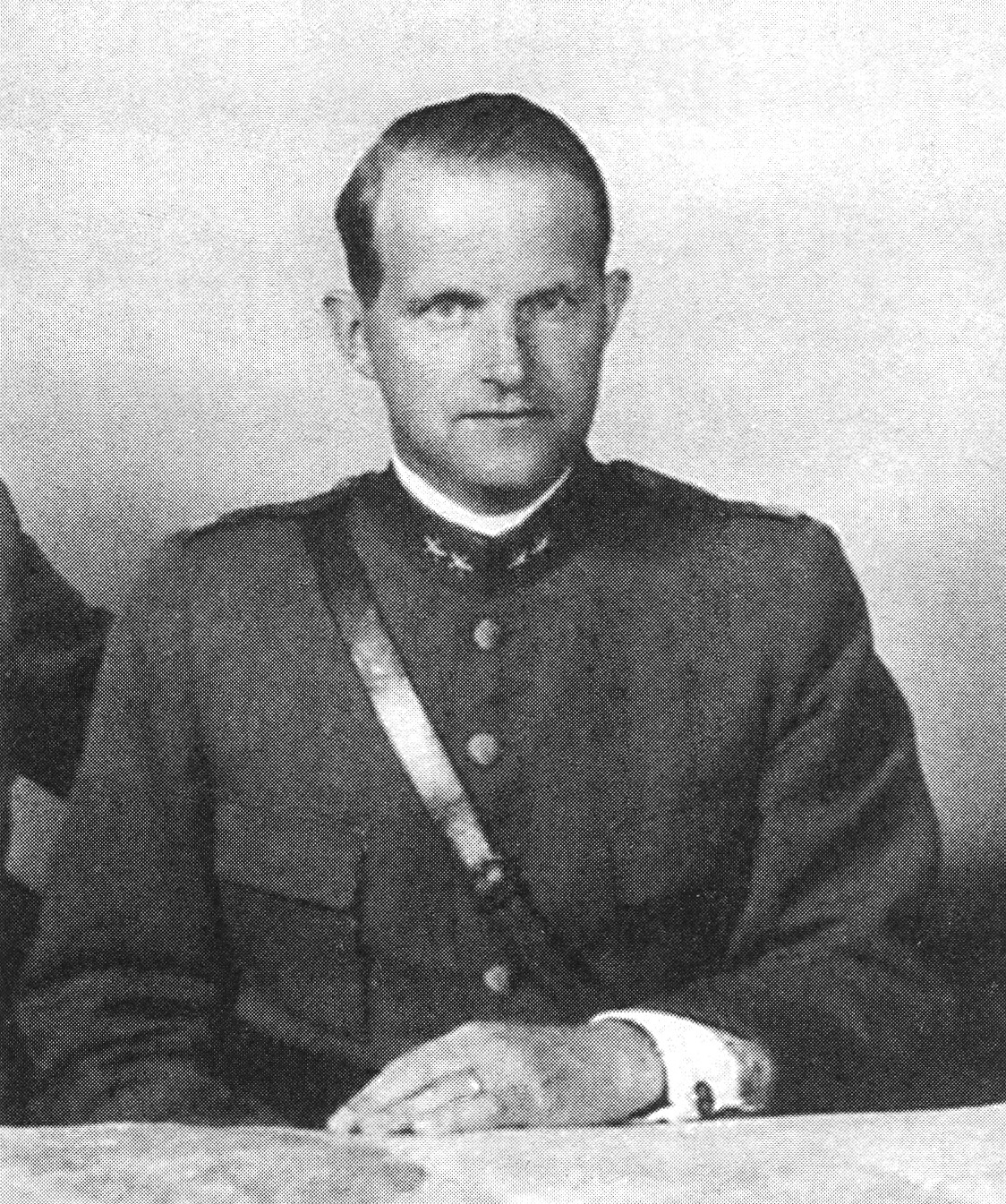
- Roth during the 1940s.
- Born: Stig Adolf Roth; 28 March 1900; Malmö, Sweden
- Died: 20 August 1972 (aged 72); Gothenburg, Sweden
- Education: Gothenburg University College
- Occupations: Art historian, museum curator, museum director
- Spouse: Mona Bratt (m. 1926)

Stig Adolf Roth (28 March 1900 – 20 August 1972) was a Swedish art historian, museum curator, and museum director.

== Early life ==
Roth was born in Malmö, Sweden, the son of the dentist Adolf Roth and his wife Kjersti Davida Svensson. He passed studentexamen in Malmö in 1918 and was an assistant during the excavations in Gamla Lödöse in 1917 and in 1919 and he became an extraordinary curator assistant at the Gothenburg Museum in Gothenburg the same year. Roth obtained a Bachelor of Arts (fil.kand.) degree in Gothenburg in 1921 and was secretary in the Jubilee Exposition in Gothenburg's Arts Committee in 1923 and curator assistant at the Gothenburg Museum of Art in 1924. Roth obtained a Licentiate of Philosophy (fil.lic.) degree in 1926.

== Career ==
Roth was the leader of the excavation of Gudhem Abbey from 1928 to 1948 and of the excavation of Bjerka Church from 1929 to 1930. Roth was curator and head of the historical department of the Gothenburg Museum from 1935 to 1965 and obtained a Doctor of Philosophy (fil.dr.) degree in 1937. During World War II, Roth was chief of C-byrån's Gothenburg Group.

He was secretary and curator of Gothenburg's Art Association (Göteborgs konstförening) in 1933 and was a board member of the City Council Natural and Cultural Protection Preparation (Stadsfullmäktiges natur- och kulturskyddsberedning) from 1935 to 1964. Roth was a board member of the Bildtska hembygdsmuseet from 1935, of the Heritage Council in Gothenburg and Bohus County (Kulturminnesrådet i Göteborgs och Bohus län) from 1935, of the Kulturminnesföreningen Gathenhielm from 1937 to 1964, of the City Library Board (Stadsbiblioteksstyrelsen) from 1943, of the Swedish Archaeological Society (Svenska arkeologiska samfundet) from 1947, of the Gunnebos styrelse from 1949 and of the Felix Lindberg's Endowment Fund (Felix Lindbergs donationsfond) from 1951. Roth was chairman of the Swedish section of the Scandinavian Museum Association (Skandinaviska museiförbundet) from 1953 to 1956.

Roth became a member of the Royal Society of Sciences and Letters in Gothenburg in 1944 and became its chairman in 1954.

== Personal life ==
In 1926 he married Mona Bratt (born 1902), the daughter of merchant Gustaf Bratt and Olga Westerberg.

== Death ==
Roth died on 20 August 1972 and was interred at Kviberg Cemetery in Gothenburg.

== Awards and decorations ==
- (Sweden) Knight of the Order of the Polar Star
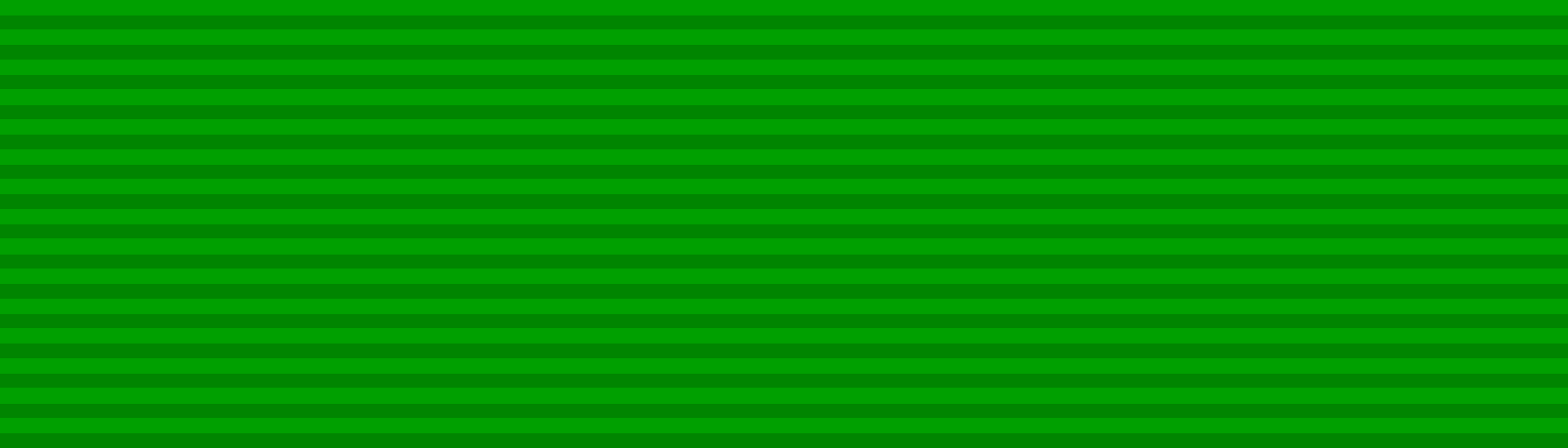
- (Sweden) Knight of the Order of Vasa
- (Sweden) City of Gothenburg's Badge of Merit in Gold (Göteborgs stads förtjänsttecken i guld)
- (Norway) King Haakon VII Freedom Cross
- Norwegian medal for personnel who participated in Norway's struggle for freedom
