= Kontoret för särskild inhämtning =

Part of the Swedish Military Intelligence and Security Service

Kontoret för särskild inhämtning (KSI), "The Office for Special Acquisition", is part of the Swedish Military Intelligence and Security Service (MUST) and also one of the most secret parts of the Swedish Armed Forces. The previous names until 1994 were: C-byrån (1939–1945), T-kontoret (1946–1964), IB (1965–1973), Gemensamma byrån för underrättelser (GBU) (1973–1982) and Sektionen för särskild inhämtning (SSI) (1982–1994).

The main task of the office is that of liaison with foreign intelligence organizations and espionage through HUMINT.
