= Karin Lannby =

Swedish actress, translator, journalist, poet and spy

Karin Tekla Maria Lannby
- Born: Karin Tekla Maria Lannby; 13 April 1916; Linköping, Sweden
- Died: 19 November 2007 (aged 91); Paris, France
- Other name: Maria Cyliakus
- Occupations: Actress, translator, journalist, poet, spy
- Years active: 1930s–1940s (espionage), post-war (translator, journalist)
- Partner: Ingmar Bergman (1940–41)
- Parent(s): Gunnar Lannby (father), Lilly Lannby (mother)

Karin Tekla Maria Lannby (13 April 1916 – 19 November 2007), credited in French films and publications as Maria Cyliakus, was a Swedish actress, translator, journalist, poet and spy. She served as a spy for the leftists during the Spanish Civil War, and for Sweden in Stockholm during World War II.

== Biography ==
The daughter of journalist Gunnar Lannby and Lilly Lannby, the boss of the Swedish agency of the American film company Metro Goldwyn Mayer. Through her mother, Lilly, Karin belonged to the Stockholm high society. As a student in the 1930s, Karin, being a convinced anti-fascist, joined the Swedish Communists. During the Spanish civil-war, she served as an interpreter and secretary at a hospital in Valencia. She made contact with the Comintern in Barcelona, who gave her an assignment to infiltrate the troops of Francisco Franco in the south of France. After having failed her task, she was excluded from the communists and returned to Sweden. From 1939 to 1945, she was an agent in service of the Swedish state during the war; under the code name Annette, she reported of her observations from the cultural and diplomatic circles of Stockholm's party life.

She acted in several films during the war. In 1940–41, she had a relationship with Ingmar Bergman; she is said to have been the role model for the character Ruth Köhler in the film Kvinna utan ansikte (1947). After the war, Karin Lannby changed her name to Maria Cyliakus and moved to France, where she was active as an actress, translator and journalist.

== See also ==
- Erika Wendt
- Jane Horney
