= Carl Petersén (army officer) =

Swedish Army officer (1883–1963)

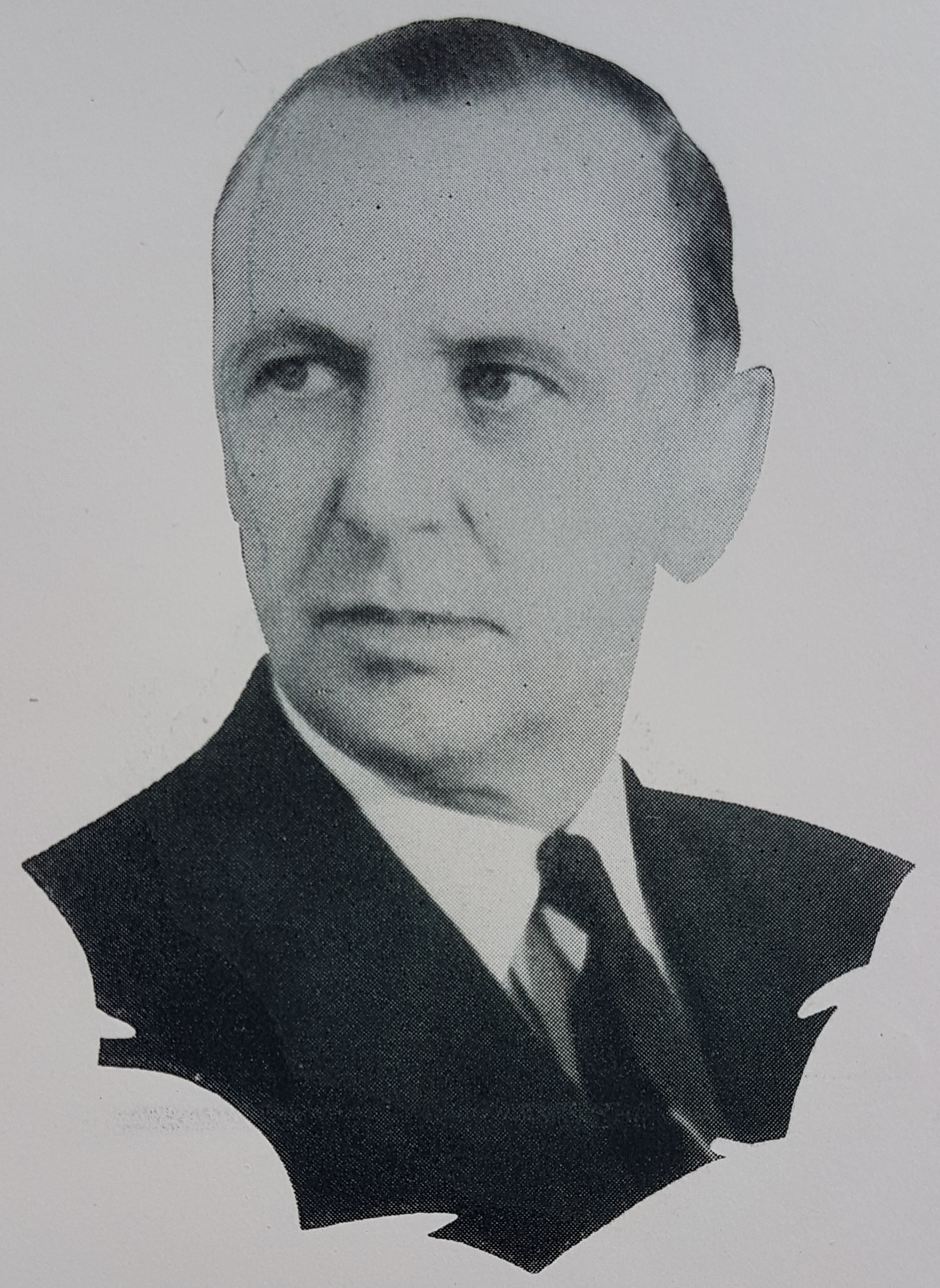
- Born: 18 April 1883; Stockholm, Sweden
- Died: 14 April 1963 (aged 79); Geneva, Switzerland
- Burial place: Norra begravningsplatsen
- Military career
- Allegiance: Sweden
- Branch: Swedish Army
- Service years: 1903–1946
- Rank: Lieutenant colonel
- Nicknames: Petter; Calle P
- Units: Persian Gendarmerie (1911–13); White Guard (1918)
- Commands: C-byrån (1940–46)
- Conflicts: World War I; Gallipoli Campaign; Finnish Civil War; World War II; Operation Stella Polaris

Carl Jacob Karsten Petersén (18 April 1883 – 14 April 1963) was a Swedish Army officer. During World War II he served as head of the intelligence agency C-byrån. He later served as Secretary General of the International Road Transport Union.

== Early life ==
Petersén was born on 18 April 1883 in Stockholm, Sweden, the son of deputy assistant Carl Petersén and Ingeborg Tanberg. He passed studentexamen at Nya Elementar in Bromma in 1901.

== Career ==
He became a second lieutenant in the Uppland Artillery Regiment (A 5) in 1903 and was promoted to lieutenant in 1906. He attended the Royal Central Gymnastics Institute in 1907. Petersén was major and instructor in the Persian Gendarmerie from 1911 to 1913 and participated in the Gallipoli Campaign in 1915. The same year he was promoted to captain in the Swedish Army and did the certificate exams for balloon license. Petersén participated in the Finnish Civil War in 1918 as a lieutenant colonel in the White Guard.

He was then attaché in Warsaw from 1919 to 1920, was in the Commission Concerning the Exchange of Greek and Turkish Populations from 1923 to 1925, the Bulgarian Refugee Commission from 1926 to 1928, in Syria in 1929 and the League of Nations border control commission in Syria and Iran in 1932. In 1932, Petersén was promoted to major in the Swedish Army. He was Head of Department at the International Red Cross in Paris from 1921 to 1937, the general secretary of the Royal Swedish Aero Club from 1937 to 1939 and was legation counsellor in Berlin and worked at the B Department of the Ministry for Foreign Affairs from 1939 to 1940. Petersén was head of the intelligence agency C-byrån from 1940 to 1946. In 1944, he led the Swedish side of the Operation Stella Polaris.

During the war, Petersén and his colleague Algot Törneman had organised private arms trades. They had sold weapons via a private firm, Skandiastål, to the Norwegian and Danish resistance movements. After the war Petersén moved to Switzerland where he continued to represent the weapons firm Skandiastål. He became a major in the reserve of Bergslagen Artillery Regiment in 1945 and a lieutenant colonel in 1947. Petersén later served as secretary general of the International Road Transport Union in Geneva.

== Personal life ==
Petersén got engaged to Esther Warodell (1886–1978) on 23 August 1909 and they married on 22 February 1910. Esther was the daughter of Oscar Andrén (1858–1918) and his wife Ellen Andersson (1863–1952). Esther was adopted by her stepfather Carl Warodell (1847–1902), a captain of the Göta Life Guards.

One daughter was born in Tehran, Iran on 19 October 1912. They also had on son, ambassador Carl Henrik Petersén (1914–1976). He had a total of four children: Carl Henrik, Ingeborg, Rurik and Kerstin.

== Death ==
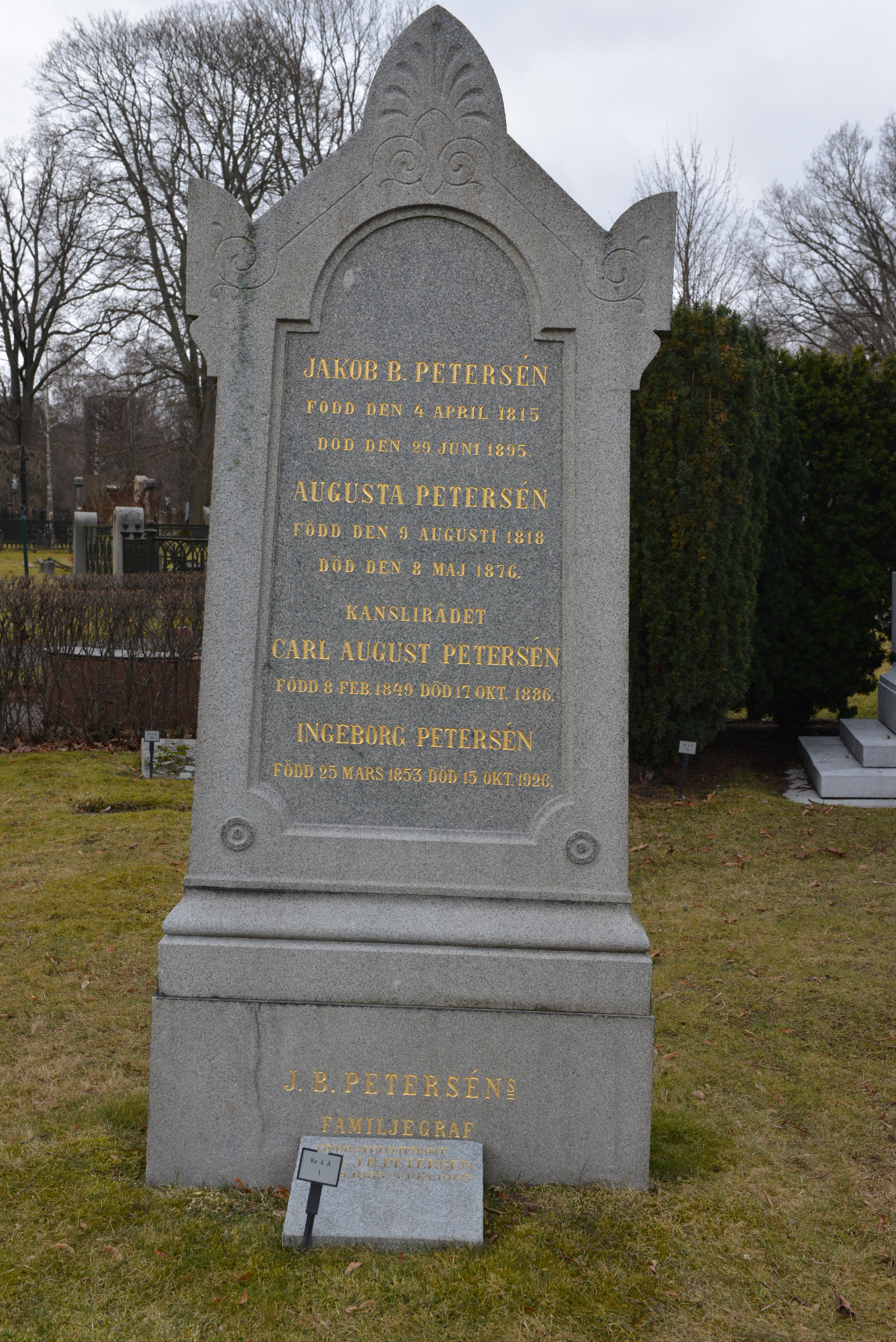
Family grave of Carl Petersén at Norra begravningsplatsen

Petersén died on 14 April 1963 in Geneva, Switzerland. He was interred on 27 June 1963 at Norra begravningsplatsen i Stockholm.

== Dates of rank ==
=== Sweden ===
- 1903 – Underlöjtnant
- 1906 – Lieutenant
- 1916 – Captain
- 1932 – Major
- 1947 – Lieutenant colonel

=== Finland ===
- 1918 – Lieutenant colonel

== Awards and decorations ==
=== Swedish ===
- (Sweden) Knight of the Order of the Sword (1925)
- (Sweden) Knight of the Order of the Polar Star (1937)
- (Sweden) Swedish Red Cross' Silver Medal

=== Foreign ===
==== Orders ====
- (Bulgaria) Commander of the Order of Saint Alexander with swords
- Commander of the Order of the White Rose of Finland
- (Latvia) Commander of the Order of the Three Stars
- (Denmark) Commander of the Order of the Dannebrog
- (United Kingdom) Commander of the Order of the British Empire
- (France) Officer of the Legion of Honour
- (Pahlavi dynasty) 2nd Class of the Order of the Lion and the Sun
- (Finland) 2nd of the Order of the Cross of Liberty with swords
- (Finland) 3rd Class of the Order of the Cross of Liberty with swords
- (Poland) Knight 2nd Class of the Order of Polonia Restituta
- (France) Officer of the de l'Instruction publique
- (Estonia) Knight 4th Class of the Order of the Cross of the Eagle

==== Medals and crosses ====
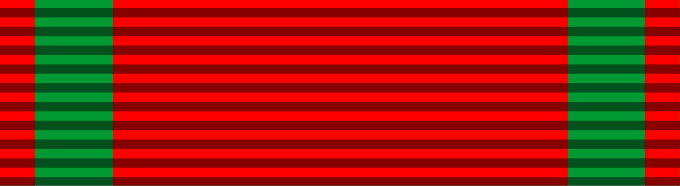
- (Ottoman Empire) Liakat Medal
- (Norway) King Haakon VII Freedom Cross
- (Belgium) Military Cross
- (Finland) Finnish War Memorial Medal
- (Finland) Tampere Medal
- (Iran) Iranian Gold Medal
- (France) French Red Cross' Silver Medal
- (Italy) Italian Red Cross' Silver Medal
- (Poland) Polish Red Cross' Medal
- Netherlands Red Cross' Cross of Merit
- (Norway) Norwegian Red Cross Badge of Honour
- (Germany) 2nd Class of the German Red Cross Badge of Honour
