= Algot Törneman =

Swedish enamel artist and painter

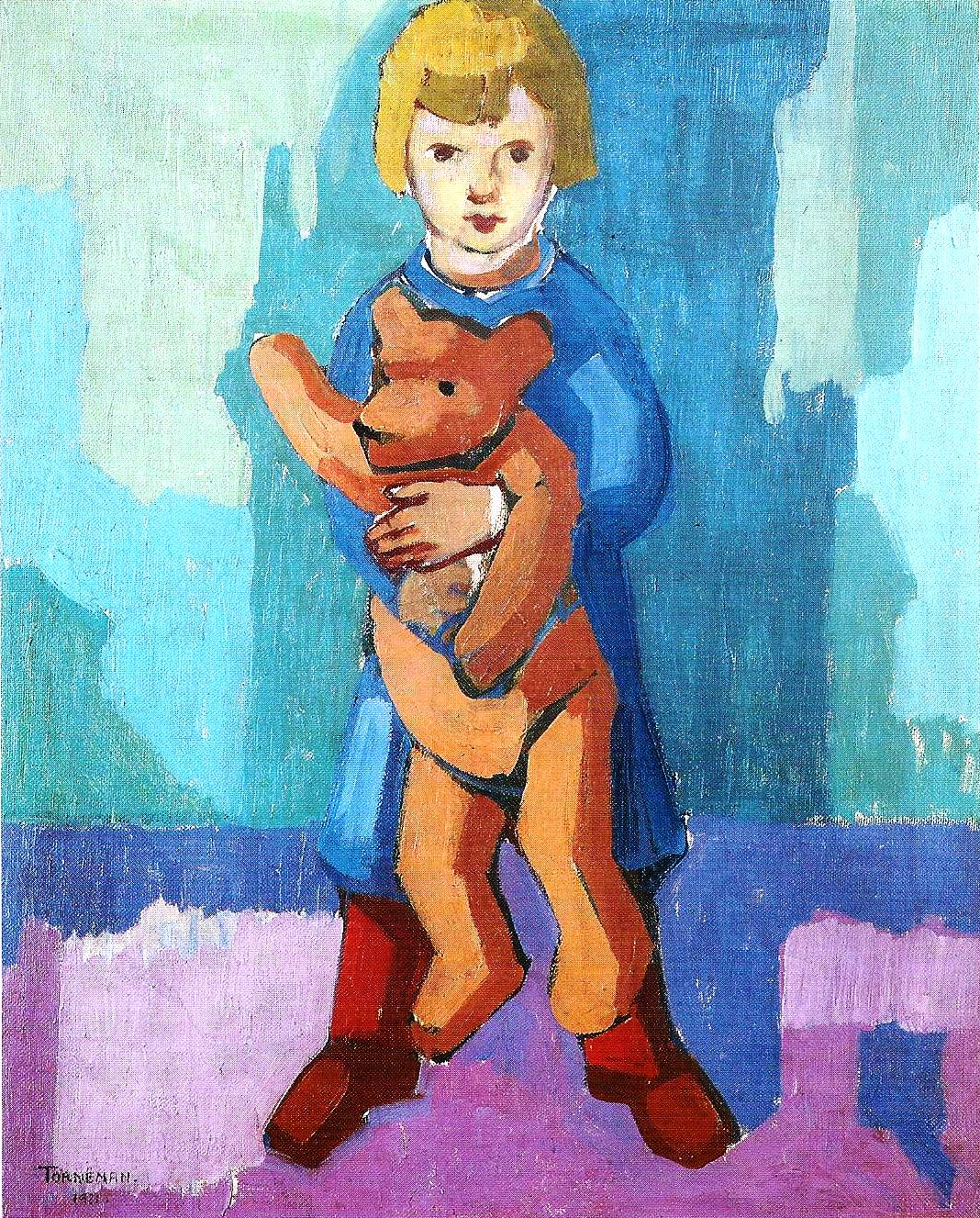
The painting Algot with a teddy bear (1921) of Algot Törneman by his father Axel Törneman.

Jarl Algot Gustav Törneman, nicknamed P. (1 September 1909 – 5 May 1993) was a Swedish enamel artist and painter.

== Early life ==
Törneman was born on 1 September 1909 in Vist, Linköping Municipality, Sweden, the son of Axel Törneman and his wife Gudrun (née Høyer). He passed studentexamen in Stockholm in 1927 and received a Candidate of Law degree from Lund University in 1937.

== Career ==
Törneman worked at Stockholm City Court in 1937 and STIM in 1940. He became CEO of AB Skandiastål in 1944 and AB Eda bruk in Värmland in 1948. During World War II, Törneman was part of the Swedish secret intelligence agency C-byrån.

Törneman was curator at the Association Hantverket in Stockholm from 1960 to 1968. He was commissioner for a number of Swedish handicraft exhibitions abroad and for the exhibition Svensk form in 1962. Törneman held solo shows in Stockholm in 1962 and in 1974. Törneman was board member of Konstfackskolan from 1963 to 1969. Törneman became secretary of the Royal Swedish Academy of Fine Arts in 1967 and an honorary member in 1968.

At Gustavsberg, he primarily worked with enamel panels intended for table surfaces. He performed embellishments in two of Systembolaget's stores in Stockholm. One mosaic of raw glass panels in the shop at Mäster Samuelsgatan.

== Personal life ==
Törneman was married 1930–1937 to Ingalill Stenhammar (1912–2002), the daughter of the architect Ernst Stenhammar and actress Anna Flygare. They had two sons: the architect Alvar (1930–1967) and the artist Ulf (1932–2002). In 1940 he married Birgit Rönström (born 1914), the daughter of engineer Axel Rönström and Eyvor (née Hallqvist).

== Awards and decorations ==
- Norwegian Freedom Medal
- King Christian X's Liberty Medal
- Professors namn (1977)
