= Persberg =

- Location within Sweden
- Coordinates: 59°45′N 14°15′E
- Country: Sweden
- Province: Värmland
- County: Värmland County
- Municipality: Filipstad Municipality

Area
  - Total: 1.47 km^{2} (0.57 sq mi)

Population (31 December 2010)
  - Total: 313
  - Density: 213/km^{2} (550/sq mi)
- Time zone: UTC+1 (CET)
  - Summer (DST): UTC+2 (CEST)
- Climate: Dfc

Persberg is a locality situated in Filipstad Municipality, Värmland County, Sweden with 313 inhabitants in 2010.
