= East Economic Bureau =

Swedish secret intelligence agency

- Öst Ekonomiska Byrån
- Abbreviation: ÖEB
- Merged into: Institute of Eastern European Economies
- Formation: 16 December 1959
- Dissolved: 1989
- Legal status: Private-law foundation
- Headquarters: Drakens Gränd 1
- Location: Stockholm, Sweden
- Fields: Financial intelligence and strategic analysis
- Budget: SEK 640,000 (1978)
- Funding: Subscribers and government funding

The East Economic Bureau (Swedish: Öst Ekonomiska Byrån, ÖEB) was a Swedish research and information organisation established in 1960 to study the economies of the Soviet Union and other Eastern Bloc countries and their economic relations with the West. It operated through a foundation established in December 1959 by representatives of Sweden's three leading commercial banks, in cooperation with the Swedish government and the private sector. The bureau's activities focused on collecting, analysing, and disseminating economic information to Swedish businesses and public authorities.

The bureau produced reports and assessments on a range of subjects, including macroeconomic developments, agriculture, energy supply, industrial sectors, and foreign trade. Its subscribers included major Swedish companies, banks, business organisations, and government agencies. The organisation initially relied on subscription fees and later received state support, including funding for its managing director and research activities. Its work combined economic research with the systematic collection of information on the economies of state-trading countries in Eastern Europe.

Following a review of the Swedish intelligence community in the early 1970s, the bureau's state funding was reorganised to reduce its organisational links with the defence establishment, as its activities were considered primarily economic rather than military. The Eastern Economic Bureau continued its work until it was formally dissolved in 1989. Parts of its activities were subsequently transferred to the Swedish National Defence Research Institute (FOA) and the Institute of Eastern European Economies (Östekonomiska institutet, ÖEI) at the Stockholm School of Economics.

== History ==
During the Second World War and the period up to the early 1950s, Sweden monitored economic developments in Eastern Europe, among other regions, through ongoing studies conducted by the Defence Staff, with some support from the business community. From 1953, this work was carried out by the Defence Staff without the participation of business interests. However, discussions between the government and the business community continued until the end of the 1950s concerning the possibility of cooperating to meet the growing demand for economic information, particularly on the Soviet Union and the countries of Eastern Europe. One objective was to promote Sweden's economic relations with these countries.

After the framework for such cooperation had been approved, and assurances had been given that the business community would provide premises while the government would ensure access to qualified leadership and the necessary information, representatives of Sweden's three leading commercial banks established the Foundation for Studies of East–West Issues (Stiftelsen för utredningar rörande öst-västfrågor) in December 1959. The organisation became known as Öst Väst Byrån (the East–West Bureau). Its purpose was to conduct research and disseminate information primarily on the economies of the Eastern Bloc and their relations with the West. Those wishing to use the bureau's services could subscribe to receive its reports and other information. The foundation was governed by a board appointed by its subscribers. The organisation was initially expected to be financed primarily through subscription fees.

The bureau began operations on 1 February 1960. After its work during the first few years was considered satisfactory and the government concluded that it met a general need of the state administration, the government decided in 1963 to provide additional support to the bureau, whose finances were under strain. The state assumed the cost of the salary of its managing director, who had previously been on leave from the Defence Staff, and established a dedicated assistant director (avdelningsdirektör) position for him within the Defence Staff. This position was subsequently upgraded to the rank of director (byråchef). From 1966, the bureau also received an annual research grant from the National Board of Trade.

Following a board decision in 1966, the foundation and the bureau changed their names to the Foundation for Studies of Eastern Economic Affairs (Stiftelsen för utredningar rörande östekonomiska frågor) and the Eastern Economic Bureau (Öst Ekonomiska Byrån), respectively. They continued their operations without interruption or significant organisational changes until the early 1970s. In connection with its 1973 review of the IB affair, however, the parliamentary Committee on Defence proposed that state support for the Eastern Economic Bureau should be provided without an organisational connection to the defence establishment, as the bureau's activities were not primarily related to defence. Consequently, from the 1974–75 fiscal year, the cost of the managing director's salary was charged to the government's eleventh expenditure area and funded through a personal director position at the National Board of Trade.

The Eastern Economic Bureau was formally dissolved in 1989. Part of its operations was transferred to the Swedish National Defence Research Institute (FOA), while another part was transferred to the Institute of Eastern European Economies (Östekonomiska institutet, ÖEI) at the Stockholm School of Economics. In 1996, the institute was transformed into the Stockholm Institute of Transition Economics (SITE).

== Organisation and tasks ==
According to the statutes adopted on 16 December 1959 by representatives of Skandinaviska Banken, Stockholms Enskilda Bank and Svenska Handelsbanken, the Foundation for Studies of Eastern Economic Affairs was a private-law foundation exempt from the 1929 Act on the Supervision of Foundations (Lag (1929:116) om tillsyn över stiftelser). The statutes had undergone only minor changes since their adoption. Those who entered into subscription agreements and were accepted as subscribers became affiliated with the foundation. In accordance with its statutes, it conducted information and research activities primarily concerning macroeconomic developments in the Eastern European state-trading countries, serving approximately twenty-five major Swedish companies, banks and business organisations, as well as six government agencies that had entered into subscription agreements with the foundation and other parts of the public administration.

The foundation's affairs were managed by a board consisting of no fewer than three and no more than eleven members, elected by the subscribers at an ordinary annual meeting, at which each subscriber had one vote. The board was based in Stockholm and had a quorum when more than half of its members were present. In addition to the annual meeting, it generally met twice a year. In the event of a tie, the chairman had the casting vote. The statutes contained no provisions governing the composition of the board.

In 1979, the board had eleven members, the maximum permitted by the statutes. Four were associated with government institutions: Ambassador Sven Backlund of the Ministry for Foreign Affairs; Vice Admiral Bengt Schuback of the Defence Staff; Olle Lindqvist, Director General of the National Board of Trade; and Sten Lundberg, Director General of the National Board of Economic Defence. Three members represented private-sector interests: Göran Ennerfelt, a director at Johnson H.A.B.; Professor Erik Höök of Jernkontoret; and Hans Swedberg, a bank director at Skandinaviska Enskilda Banken. Arne S. Lundberg, an envoy associated with the state-owned company Statsföretag AB, occupied an intermediate position between the public and private sectors. Two further members were active in politics and higher economic education, respectively: Carl Bildt, a secretary, and Professor Erik Dahmén of the Stockholm School of Economics. Ragnar Sundén, a former managing director of Jernkontoret, had served as chairman since the foundation was established. Board members and the foundation's auditor had received no remuneration for their duties.

The foundation conducted its activities through the Eastern Economic Bureau (Öst Ekonomiska Byrån), which was headed by a managing director responsible for its operations and who regularly reported to the board. As previously noted, the managing director's salary was paid by the state. The bureau's staff consisted of one full-time researcher, several part-time researchers, and three or four secretarial and archival assistants, one of whom was responsible for a substantial portion of the archive-related work. The full-time researcher also served as assistant to the managing director and supervised the other research staff. The full-time researchers had generally completed degrees in business and economics and possessed knowledge of Russian and, in some cases, another Slavic language. The part-time researchers' periods of employment varied considerably, ranging from just under one year to three years. Recruitment usually took place through contacts established by existing staff members and primarily involved university students in economics, law or political science who had attended the Swedish Armed Forces Interpreter School (Försvarets tolkskola, TolkS) in Uppsala or had otherwise acquired knowledge of Russian.

New researchers were generally initially employed on a fee basis. In the past, candidates for positions in the Ministry for Foreign Affairs had also undertaken trial assignments at the bureau for periods of five to six consecutive months as part of their training, with their salaries paid by the state. Some research was also commissioned from independent researchers working on a fee basis. These external contributors were recruited primarily from among former bureau employees. Over the years, approximately 50 people had been employed as researchers by the bureau. At the beginning of 1978, 13 former or current researchers were employed in the foreign service, 12 in other government ministries and agencies, and 12 in the business sector. The bureau had initially operated from premises provided by Jernkontoret. Since 1968, however, the foundation had rented five rooms in a building in Stockholm's Old Town, at Drakens Gränd 1. In 1978, the bureau's budget was balanced at approximately SEK 640,000.

== Board and managing directors ==
=== Board ===
Under the foundation's statutes of 16 December 1959, its board was appointed by the foundation's principals. According to its revised statutes of 25 March 1981, he foundation's board was appointed by both the foundation's principals and the state.

1978 board: director Ragnar Sundén, envoy Arne S. Lundberg, ambassador Sven Backlund, professor Erik Dahmén, director Göran Ennerfelt, professor Erik Höök, director general Olle Lindqvist, director general Sten Lundberg, bank executive Hans Swedberg, and General Stig Synnergren.

1981 board: director Arne S. Lundberg (chairman), professor Erik Dahmén (vice chairman), ambassador Sven Backlund, state secretary Carl Bildt, director Göran Ennerfelt, professor Erik Höök, former director general Olle Lindqvist, director general Gunnar Nordbeck, ambassador Göran Ryding, Vice Admiral Bengt Schuback, and bank executive Hans Swedberg.

1984 board: professor Erik Dahmén, director Göran Ennerfelt, professor Erik Höök, ambassador Göran Ryding, bank executive Hans Swedberg, General Stig Synnergren, former ambassador Sven Backlund, member of parliament Carl Bildt, Vice Admiral Bror Stefenson, director general Gunnar Söder, director general Axel Wallén, and state secretary Erik Åsbrink.

1989 board: elected by the principals; director Göran Ennerfelt (chairman), rector Staffan Burenstam Linder, chief economist Karl Olof Lindgren, director Orvar Nyquist, bank executive Hans Swedberg, General Stig Synnergren; elected by the state; director general Ragnar Sohlman (vice chairman), ambassador Sven Backlund, director (departementsråd) Katarina Brodin, Lieutenant General Torsten Engberg, and director general Gunnar Söder.

=== Managing directors ===
- 1959–1981: Jan Rydström
- 1981–1989: Jan Leijonhielm
