= Erika Wendt =

German secretary

Hildegard Meta Erika Wendt (née Schwarze; 1917 – 9 April 2003) was a German secretary. During World War II, she was active as a Swedish spy as an employée of August Fincke, the German attaché of trade in Stockholm.

Wendt was of partially Jewish ancestry, and her father's publication business in Stralsund had been confiscated by the Nazis. From January 1942, she was a secretary of the German attaché of trade in Stockholm. She provided information about secret Gestapo operations and agents active in Sweden under the code name Onkel (Uncle). The Germans changed the codes on 1 March 1943, and she helped the Swedes to break the new codes by sending several messages uncoded. After this, Wendt received an order to return to Germany, not knowing that she was to be executed, and was taken into custody by the Swedish security police which provided her with a new identity. She lived the rest of her life in Sweden and published her memoirs in 1993.

== See also ==
- Jane Horney
- Karin Lannby
