= Yngen =

Lake in Filipstad, Sweden

- Lake
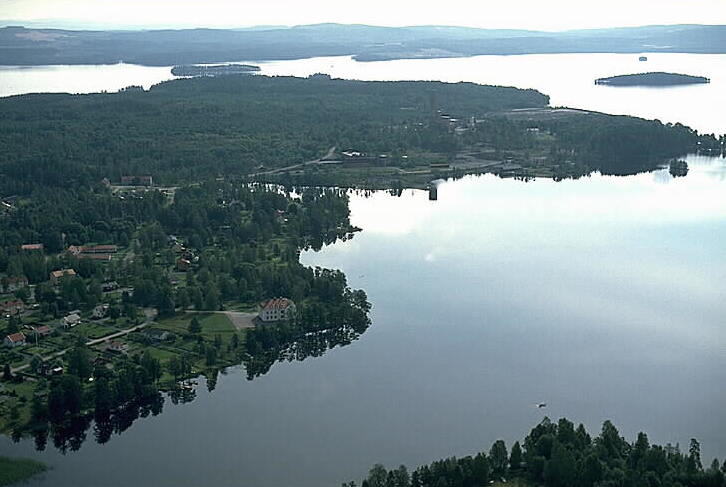
- Persberg and Yngen August 8, 1989
- Interactive map of Yngen
- Location: Sweden
- Coordinates: 59°43′48″N 14°18′36″E
- Primary outflows: Göta river
- Catchment area: 122,566 km^{2} (47,323 sq mi)
- Surface area: 27 km^{2} (10 sq mi)
- Surface elevation: 199 m (653 ft)

Yngen is an oligotrophic clear water lake located in the east of Filipstad, in the municipality of Filipstad in Värmland. It is part of the main catchment area of the Göta River. The lake has an area of 27 square kilometers and has an elevation of 199 meters above sea level. The lake is drained by the stream of Storforsälven (Skärjbäcken) which flows towards Timsälven. Yngen has a large number of fish species, including alpine bullhead, minnow and an abundant population of European perch. It also provides potable water for Filipstad, Nykroppa and Persberg. The Högbergsfältet nature reserve is located on the northwest shore of the lake.

== Geology and ecology ==
Yngen is one of the county's most valuable lakes. The calcareous rock in the surroundings results in a high and stable pH value and a buffer capacity that resists acid deposition. The water is very clear and nutrient-poor with a visibility depth of around 10 meters. The surrounding area is largely made up of forests. The soil types are moraine and glacial gravel. The lake is situated within a mineral-rich and a geologically complex and interesting area, in the west of Bergslagen. The Yngen lake is classified as a nationally particularly valuable water for fisheries management and nature conservation, and is of national interest for nature conservation in its entirety. Several natural values are linked to the bedrock geological conditions. Here are also valuable agricultural landscapes, plant habitats and rich fenses.

== Islands ==
The islands of Yngen are of great importance to the landscape. They are covered with pine and deciduous forests of different ages. Getön, Älgön, Storön and Limön are of particular interest from a geological and botanical point of view. The presence of limestone provides a rich flora on the islands, including nailwort, saxifraga adscendens, liverleaf, wood vetch, flat pea, maidenhair spleenwort, baneberry, and mezereum. In addition, there are a number of orchids such as broad-leaved helleborine, dark-red helleborine and fragant orchid.

Getön

On Getön, which is only 350 meters long and 150 meters wide, there has been extensive mining, with both mines and smelters. Mineralogically speaking, the island is probably the most interesting small area in the entire Filipstad Bergslag. Nowhere else in the region is there such a large number of rock types and ore types represented in such a small area. Here, minerals including silver, copper, lead, zinc, iron, and lime have been mined here.

Between 1784 and 1918, 64,000 tons of usable iron ore were mined here, down to a depth of 148 meters, and between 1918 and 1921, 4,655 tons of lime were also mined here.

Storön

There has also been mining (iron) in several mines on Storön. A total of 13,000 tons of ore were mined between 1753 and 1870.

== Fish population ==
One of the most interesting fish species in Yngen is the arctic char, as the lake contains one of the few original char stocks in the south of the Dalälven river. Other fish fauna includes burbot, perch, smelt, minnow, common bleak, common roach and eel. Species/variants such as fathead minnow, arctic char, trout of Gullspång and rainbow trout have been planted during the 20th century. European crayfish were previously abundant in the lake, but are now extinct due to a plague outbreak. However, introduced signal crayfish have grown in population in recent years.

The table below shows the species of fish and crustaceans found in Yngen and the relative size of the population.

| Species | Population | Presence | Comment |
Fish species
| European perch | Natural | Plenty | |
| Asp | Natural | No data | |
| Alpine bullhead | Natural | No data | |
| Minnow | Natural | No data | |
| Ruffe | Natural | Normal | |
| Northern pike | Natural | Regular | |
| Burbot | Natural | Minor | |
| Atlantic salmon | Natural | Normal | Additionally, there are implanted salmon variants |
| Common bleak | Natural | Normal | |
| Common roach | Natural | Normal | |
| European smelt | Natural | Normal | |
| Rainbow trout | Introduced | No data | |
| Arctic char | Natural | Normal | |
| European whitefish | Natural | Regular | |
| European cisco | Natural | Normal | |
| Eel | Natural | No data | |
| Brown trout | Natural | Minor | |
Crayfish species
| European crayfish | Natural | Extinct | Declared a pest in 1991 |
| Signal crayfish | Introduced | Minor | |

== Sub-catchment area ==
Yngen is part of the subbasin (662505-141657) that SMHI calls the outlet of Yngen. The average altitude is 221 meters above sea level and the area is 84.43 square kilometers. If the four upstream catchment areas are included, the accumulated area is 122.56 square kilometers. The Storforsälven river (Skärjbäcken) that drains the catchment area has tributary a order of 4, which means that the water flows through a total of four watercourses before reaching the sea after 349 kilometers. The catchment area is mostly forest (56 percent). It also has 29.36 square kilometers of water surface, giving it a lake percentage of 34.7 percent. The settlements in the area cover an area of 1.34 square kilometers or 2 percent of the drainage area.
