= Wall poems in Leiden =

Art project in Leiden, The Netherlands

Wall Poems
- Muurgedichten, Gedichten op muren
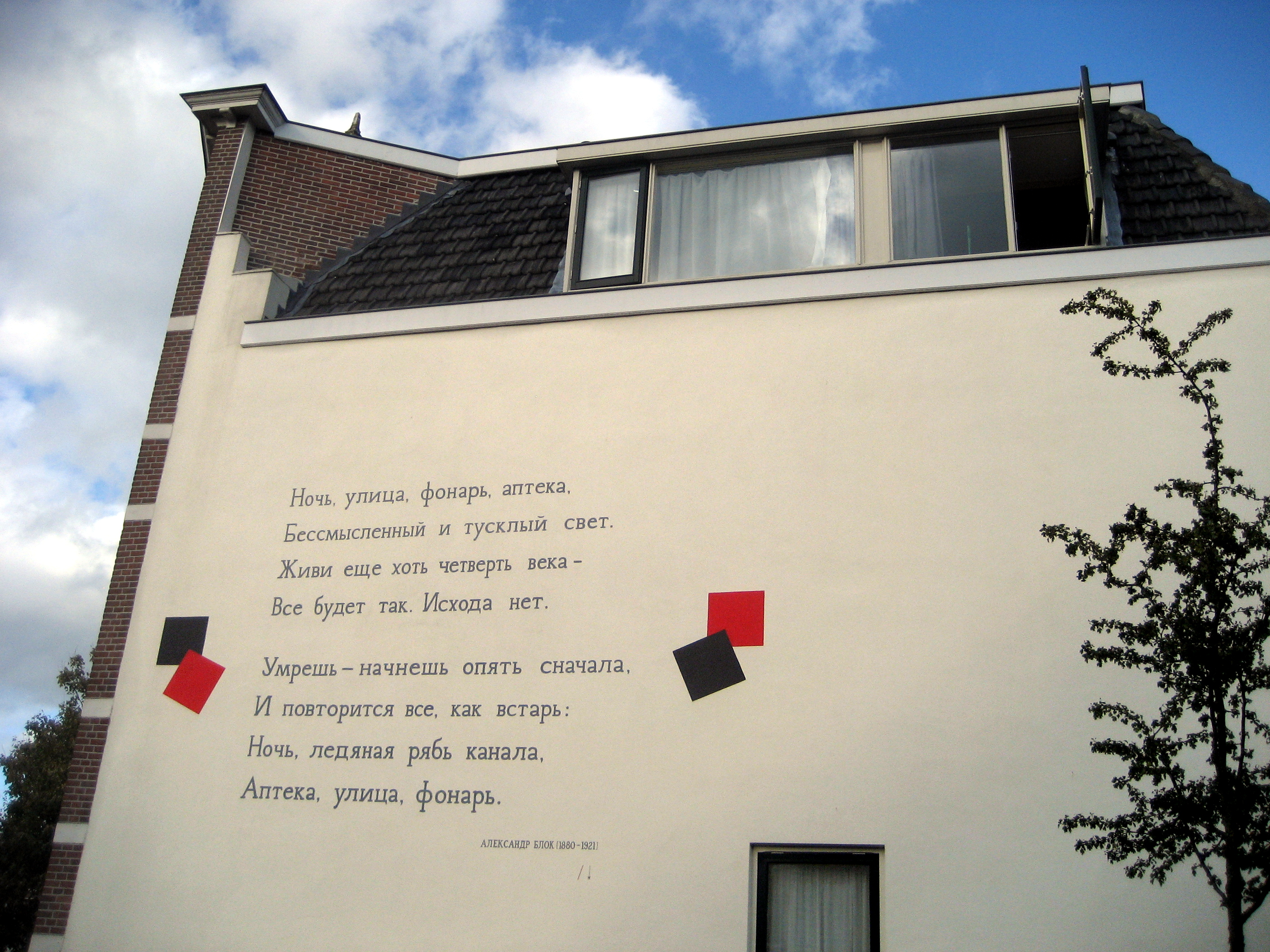
- A 1912 wall poem in Russian by Alexander Blok. "Ночь, улица, фонарь, аптека," (translation: "The night. The street. Street-lamp. Drugstore,"). Leiden, corner of Roodenburgerstraat and Thorbeckestraat, 2013
- Artist: Ben Walenkamp; Jan Willem Bruins
- Year: 1992
- Movement: Street art
- Subject: Poetry
- Location: Leiden, The Netherlands
- Followed by: Wall physics formulas in Leiden

Wall Poems (Dutch: Muurgedichten, alternatively Gedichten op muren or Dicht op de Muur) is a project in which more than 110 poems in many different languages were painted on the exterior walls of buildings in the city of Leiden, the Netherlands.

== History and description ==
The Wall Poems project was partly funded by the private Tegen-Beeld foundation of Ben Walenkamp and Jan Willem Bruins, the project's two artists, with additional funding from several corporations and the city of Leiden. It began in 1992 with a poem in Russian by Marina Tsvetaeva and (temporarily) finished in 2005 with the Spanish poem De Profundis by Federico García Lorca. Other poets included in the set include E. E. Cummings, Langston Hughes, Jan Hanlo, Du Fu, Louis Oliver, Pablo Neruda, Rainer Maria Rilke, William Shakespeare, and W. B. Yeats, as well as local writers Piet Paaltjens and J. C. Bloem. One of the more obscure poems in the collection is written in the Buginese language on a canal wall near the Royal Netherlands Institute of Southeast Asian and Caribbean Studies; it and many of the other poems are accompanied by plaques with translations into Dutch and English.

The first 43 poems have been collected in a book by Marleen van der Weij, Dicht op de muur: gedichten in Leiden, and the rest are described in a second volume, published in 2005.

== Gallery ==
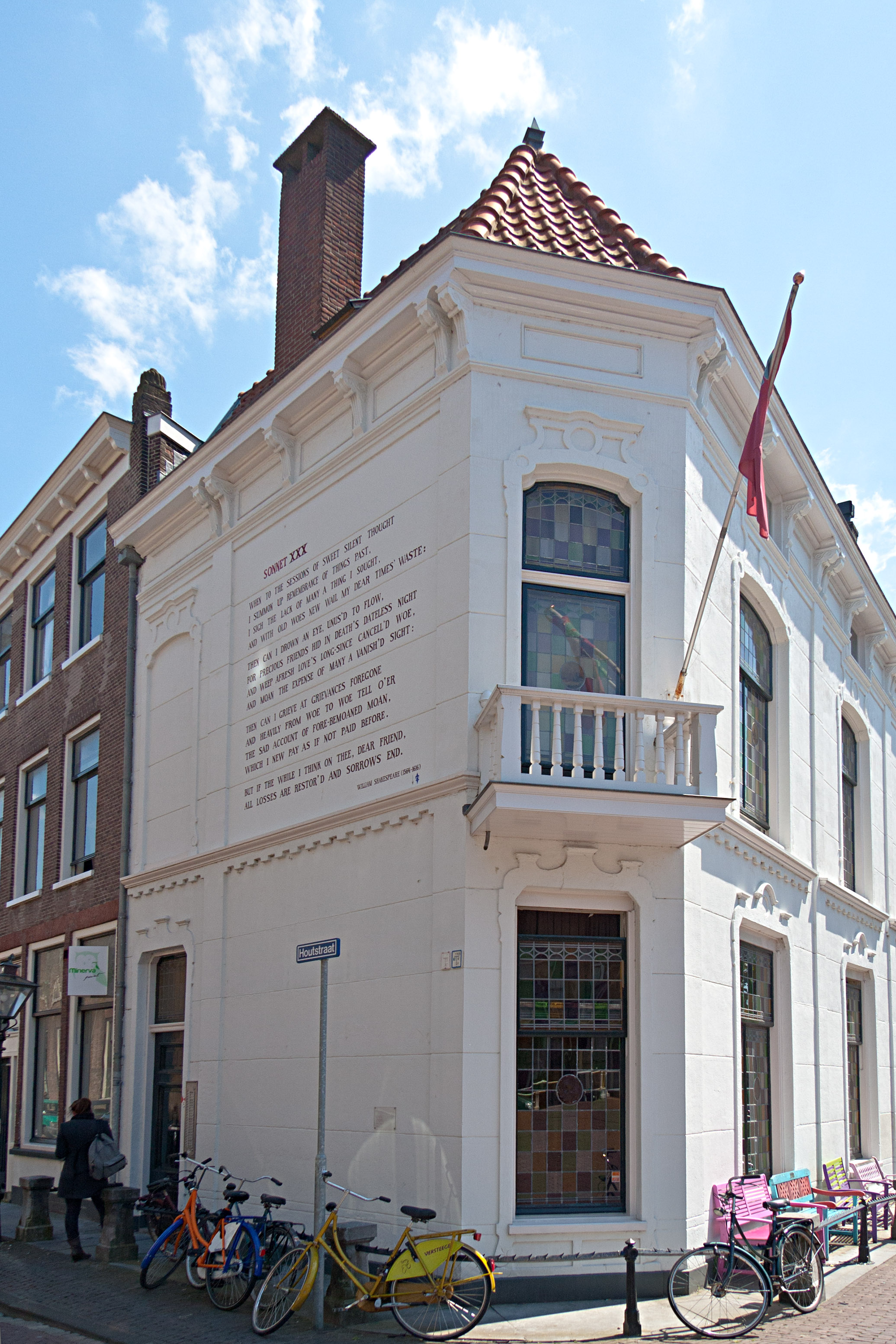
William Shakespeare

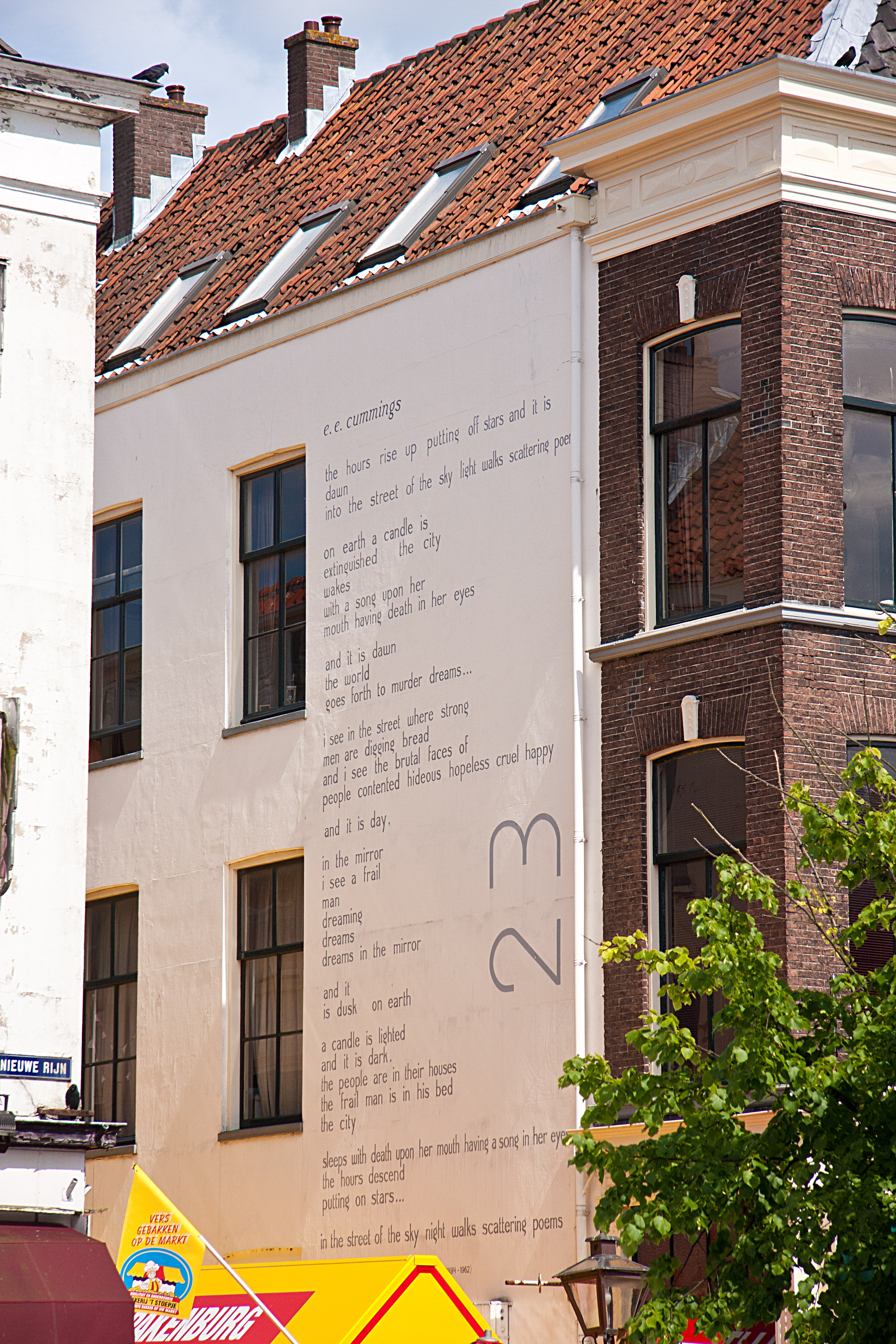
E.E. Cummings

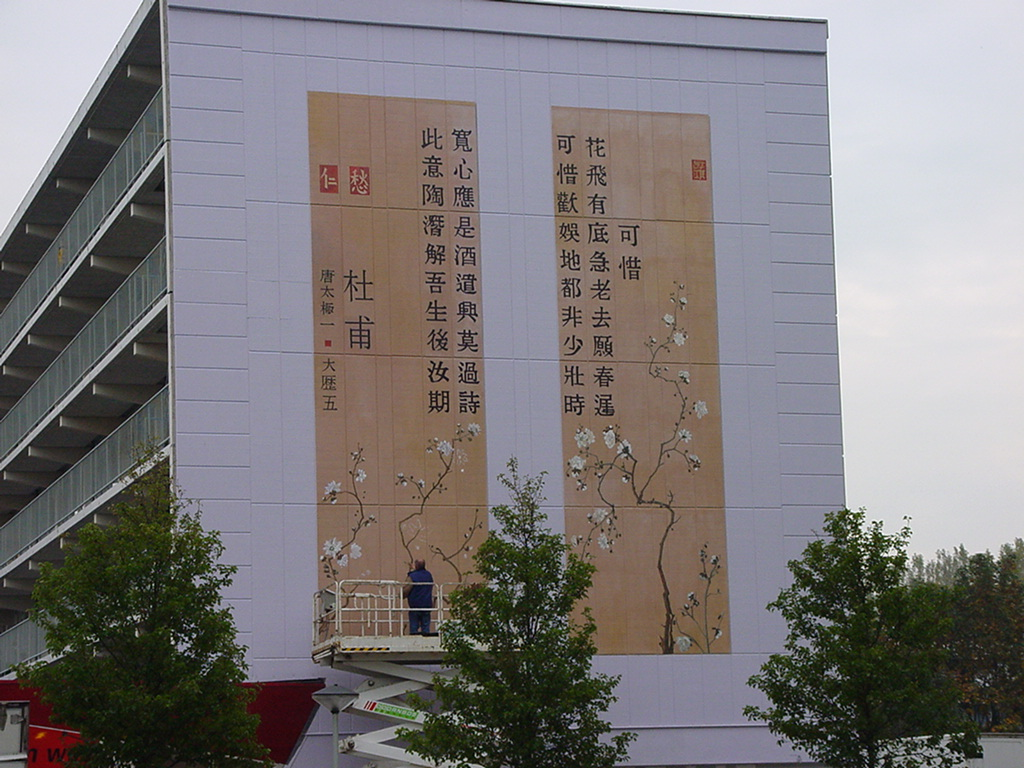
Du Fu

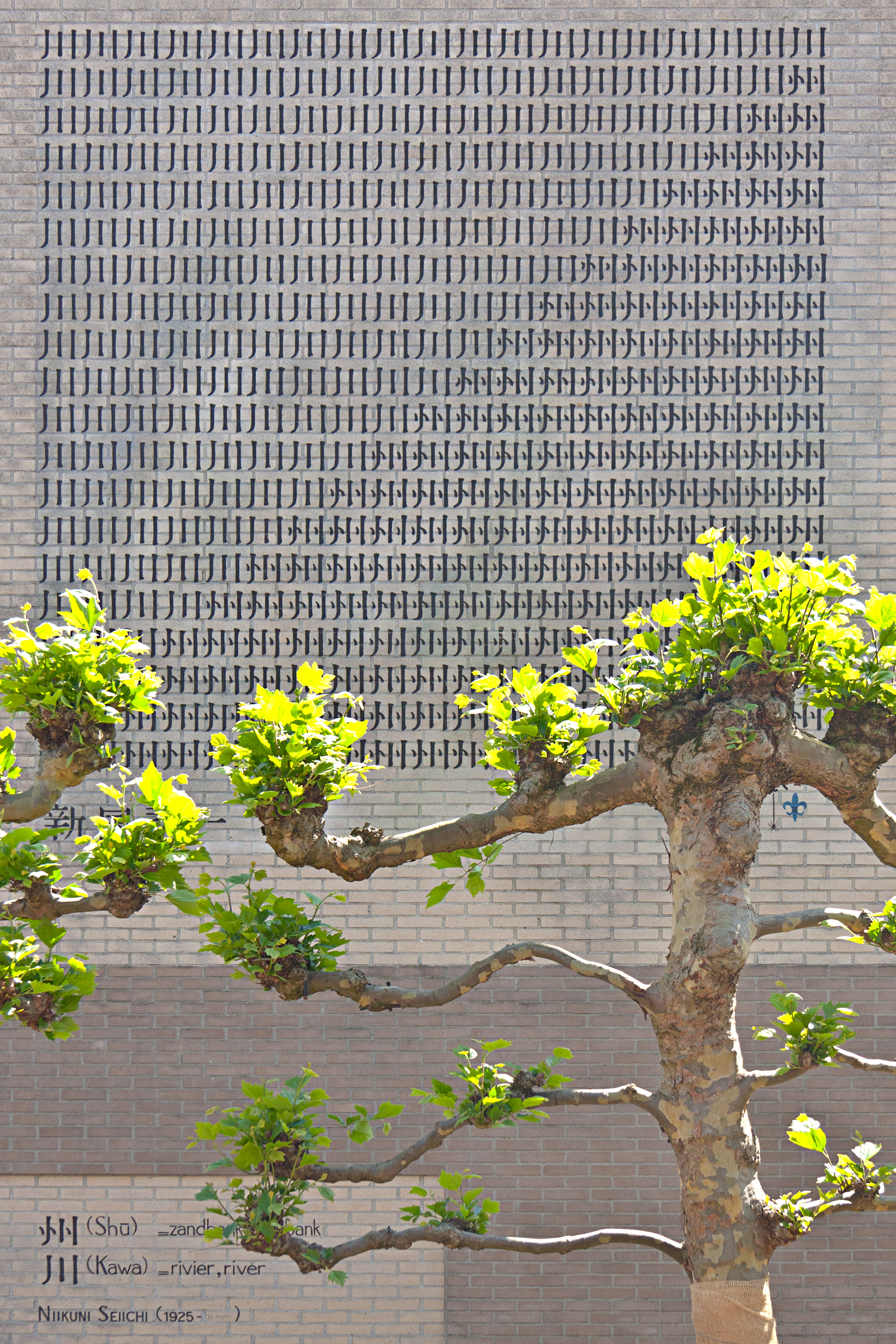
Seiichi Niikuni

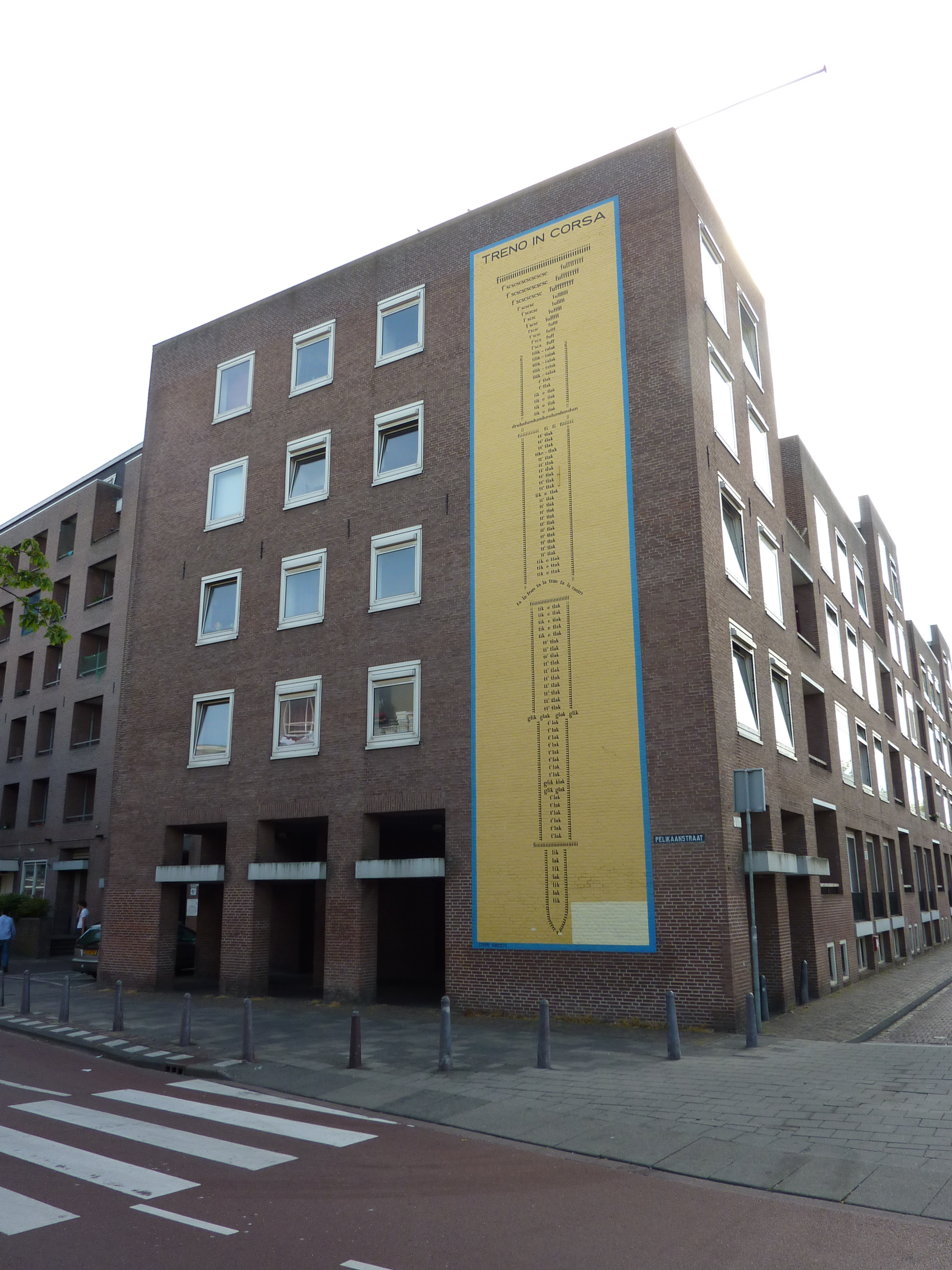
Cesare Simonetti

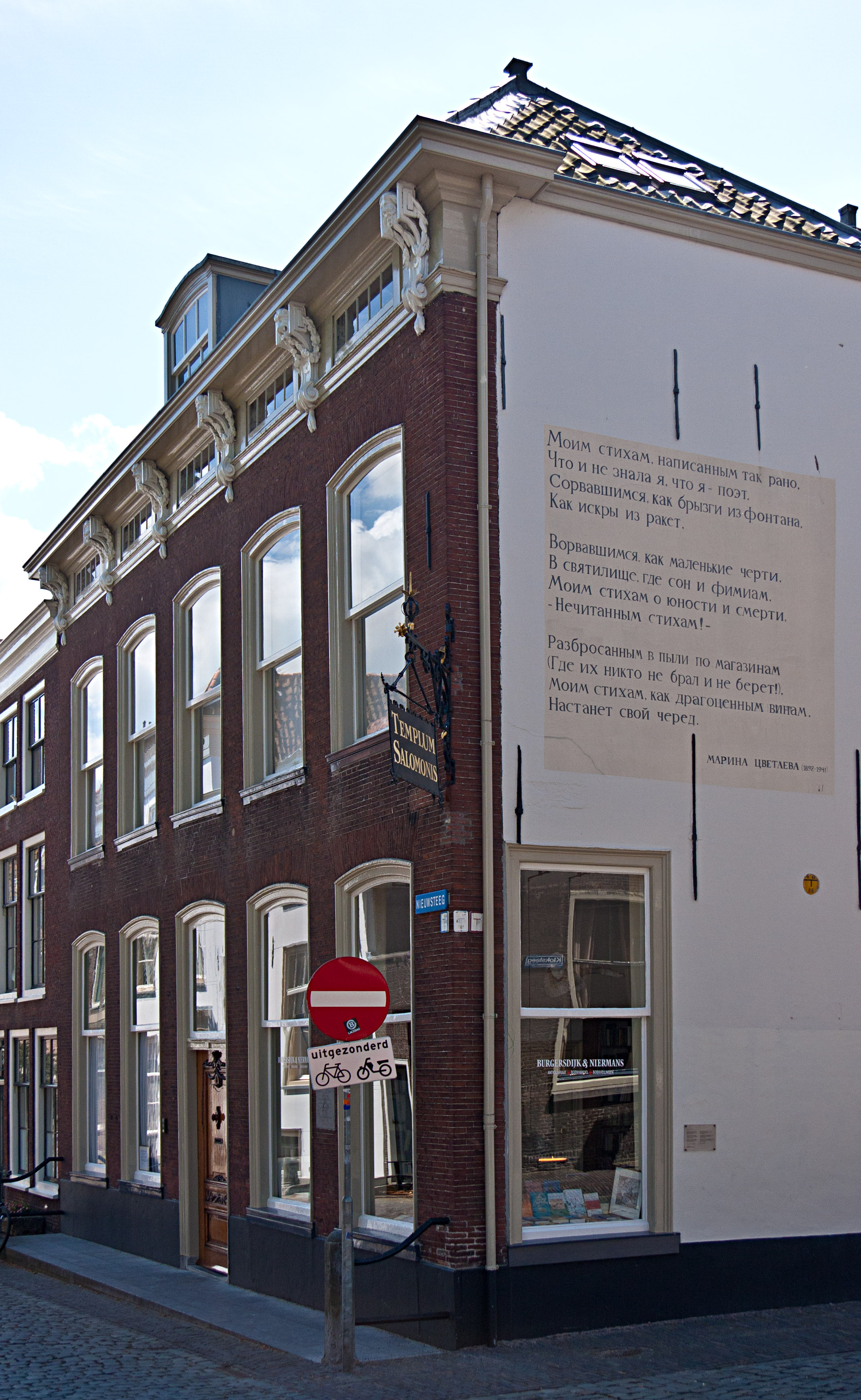
Marina Tsvetaeva

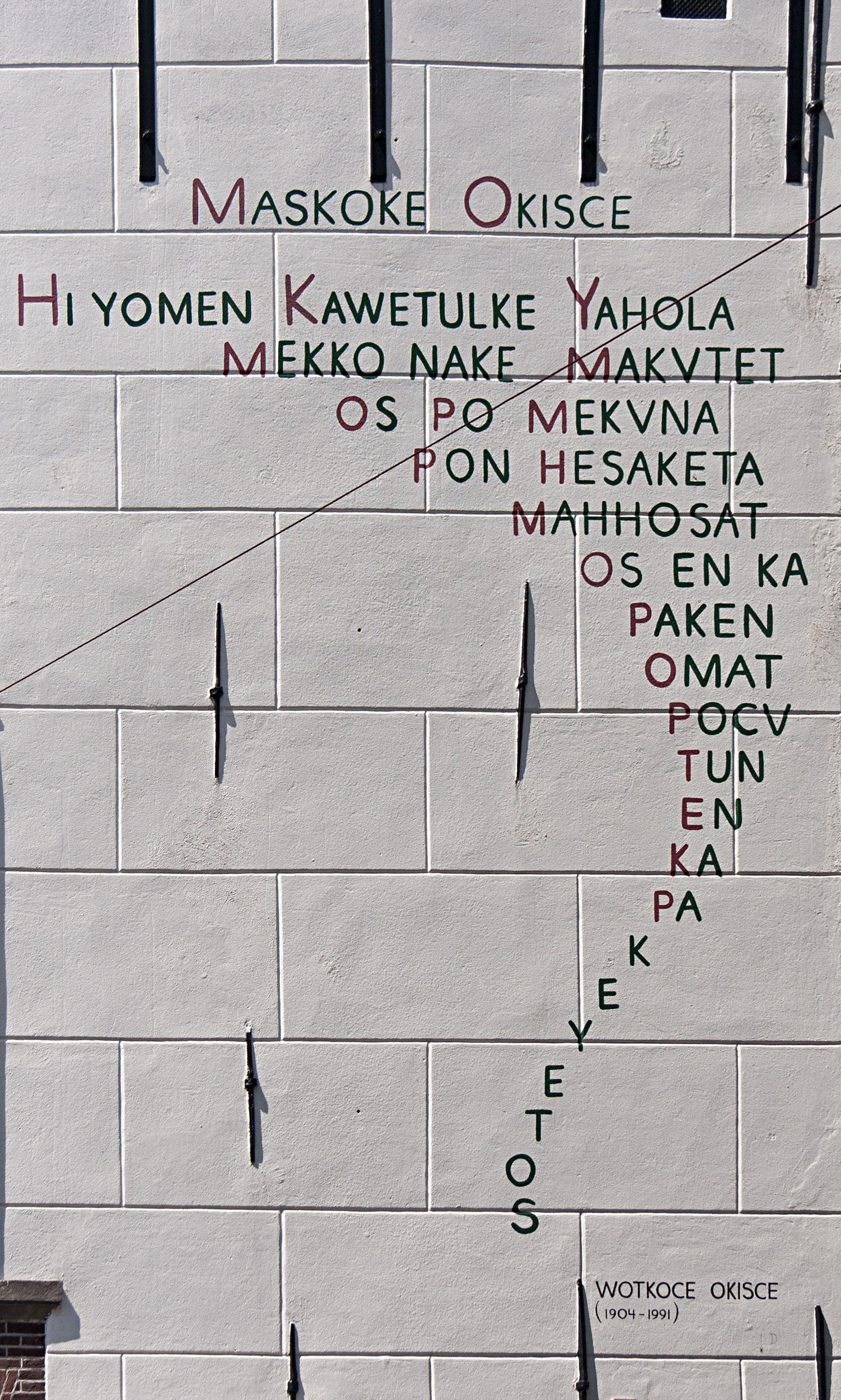
Louis Oliver

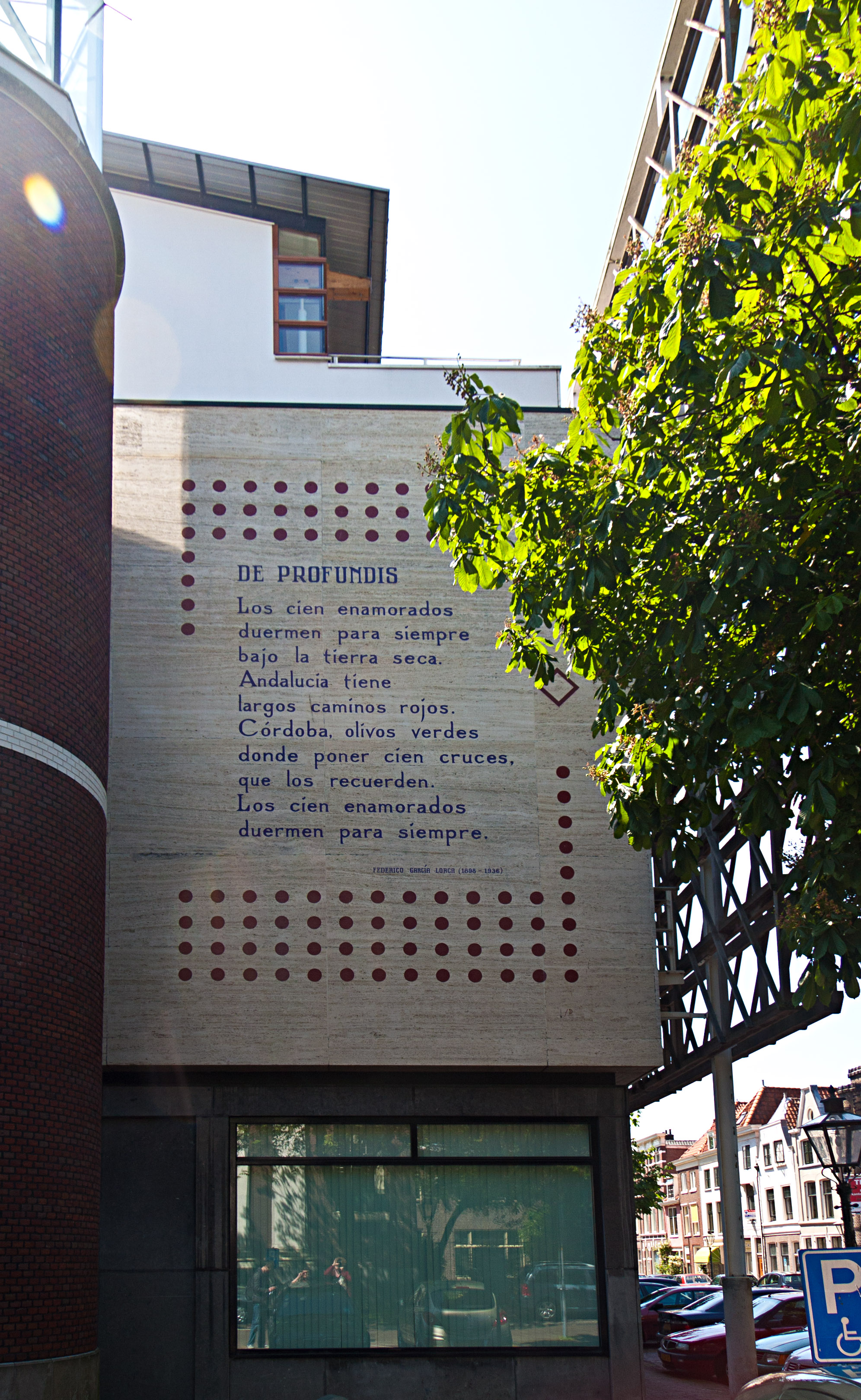
Federico García Lorca

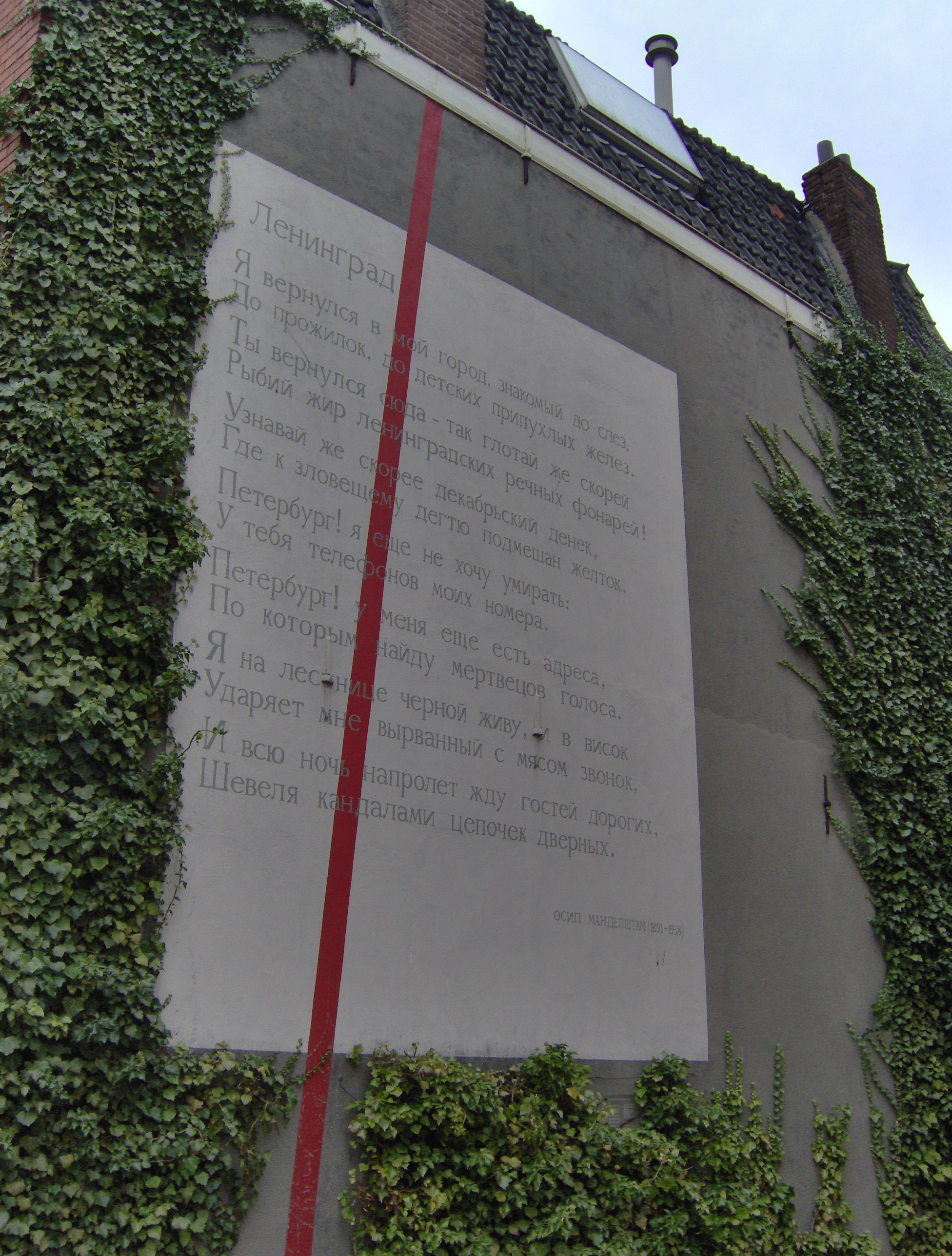
Osip Mandelstam

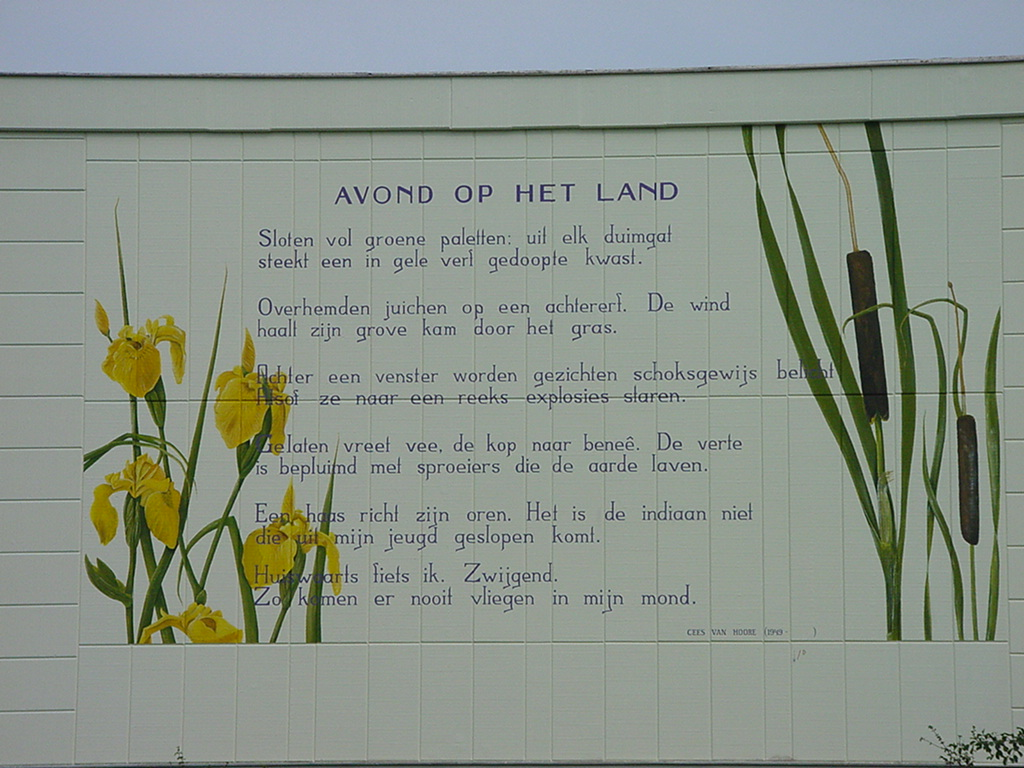
Cees van Hoore

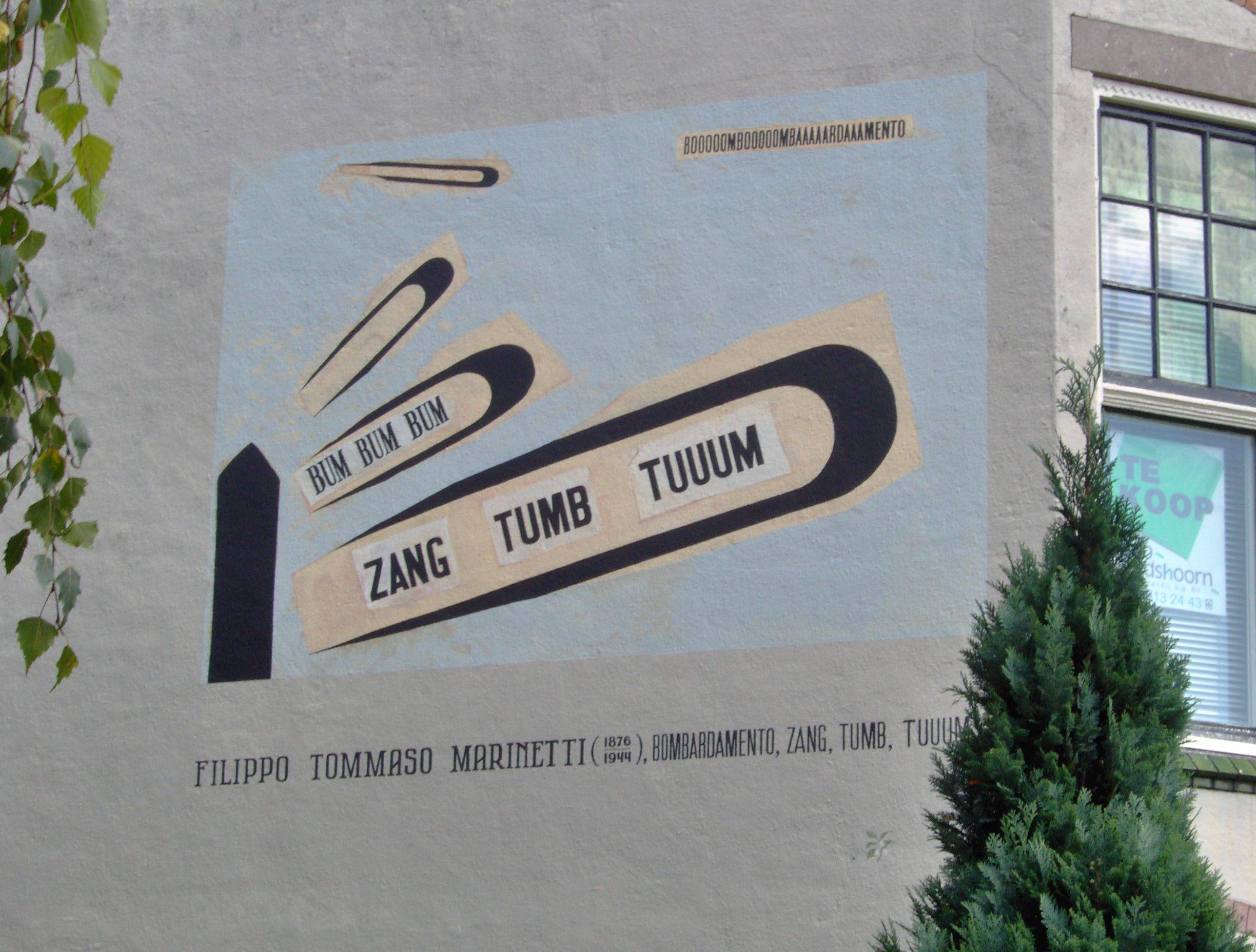
Filippo Tommaso Marinetti

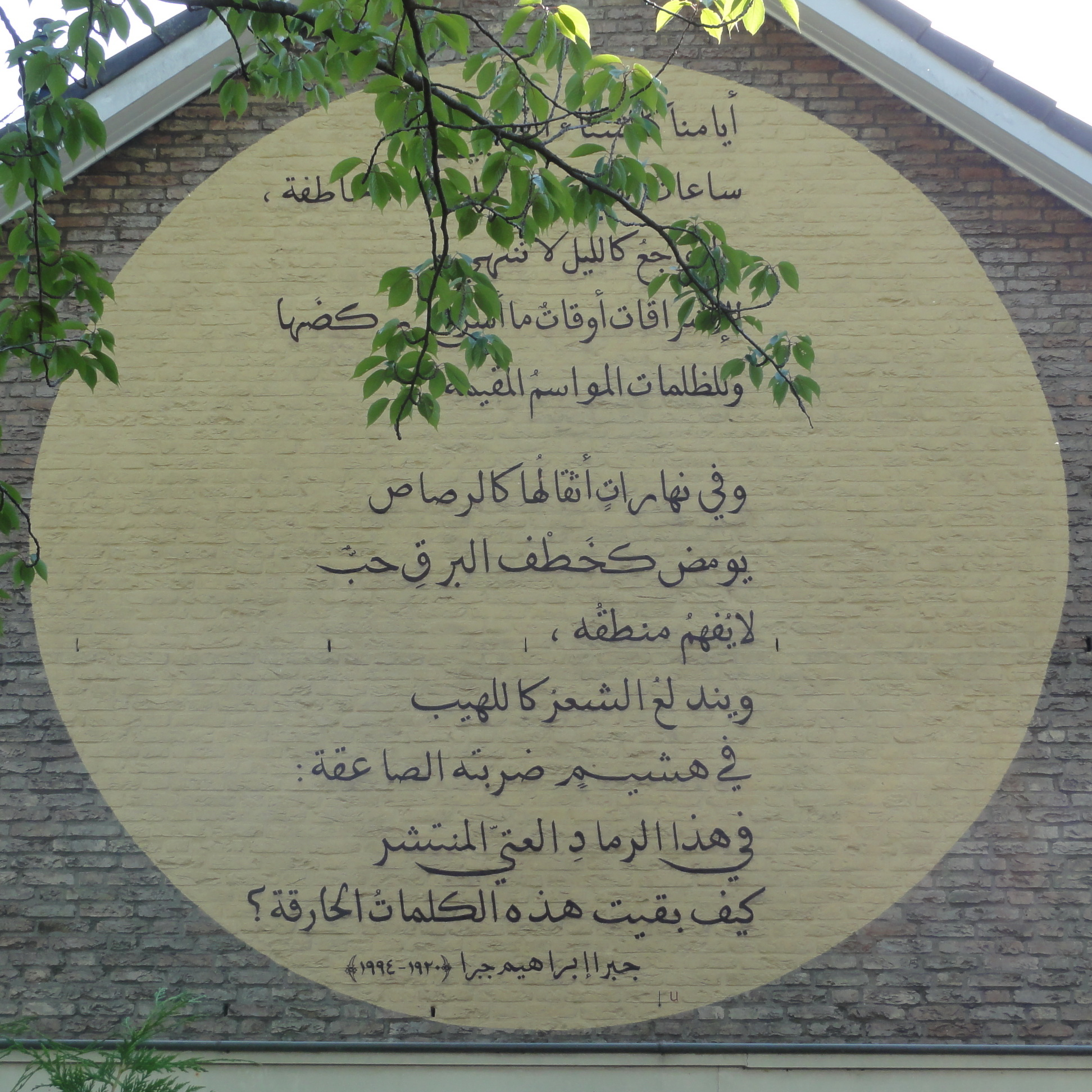
Jabra Ibrahim Jabra

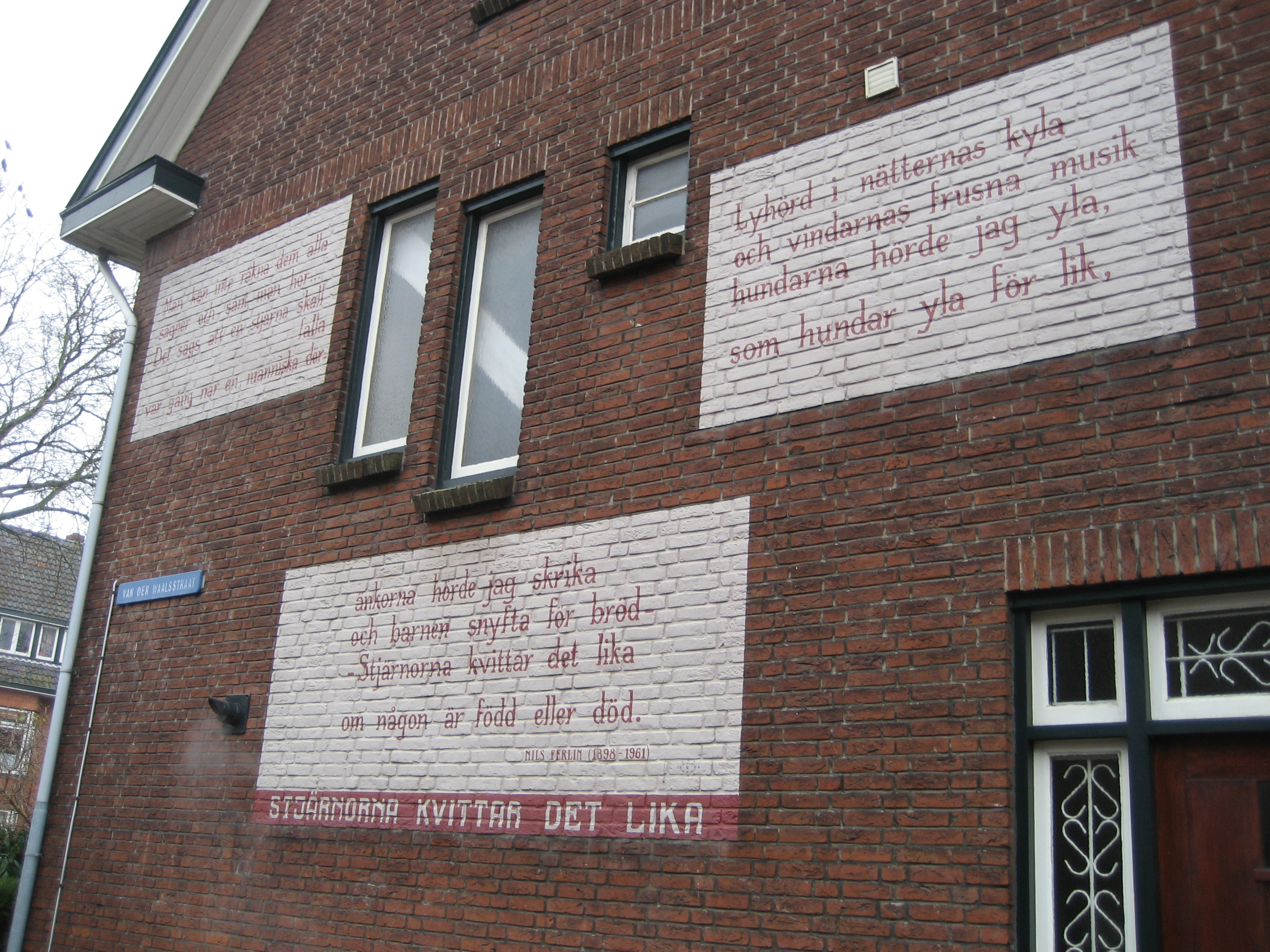
Nils Ferlin

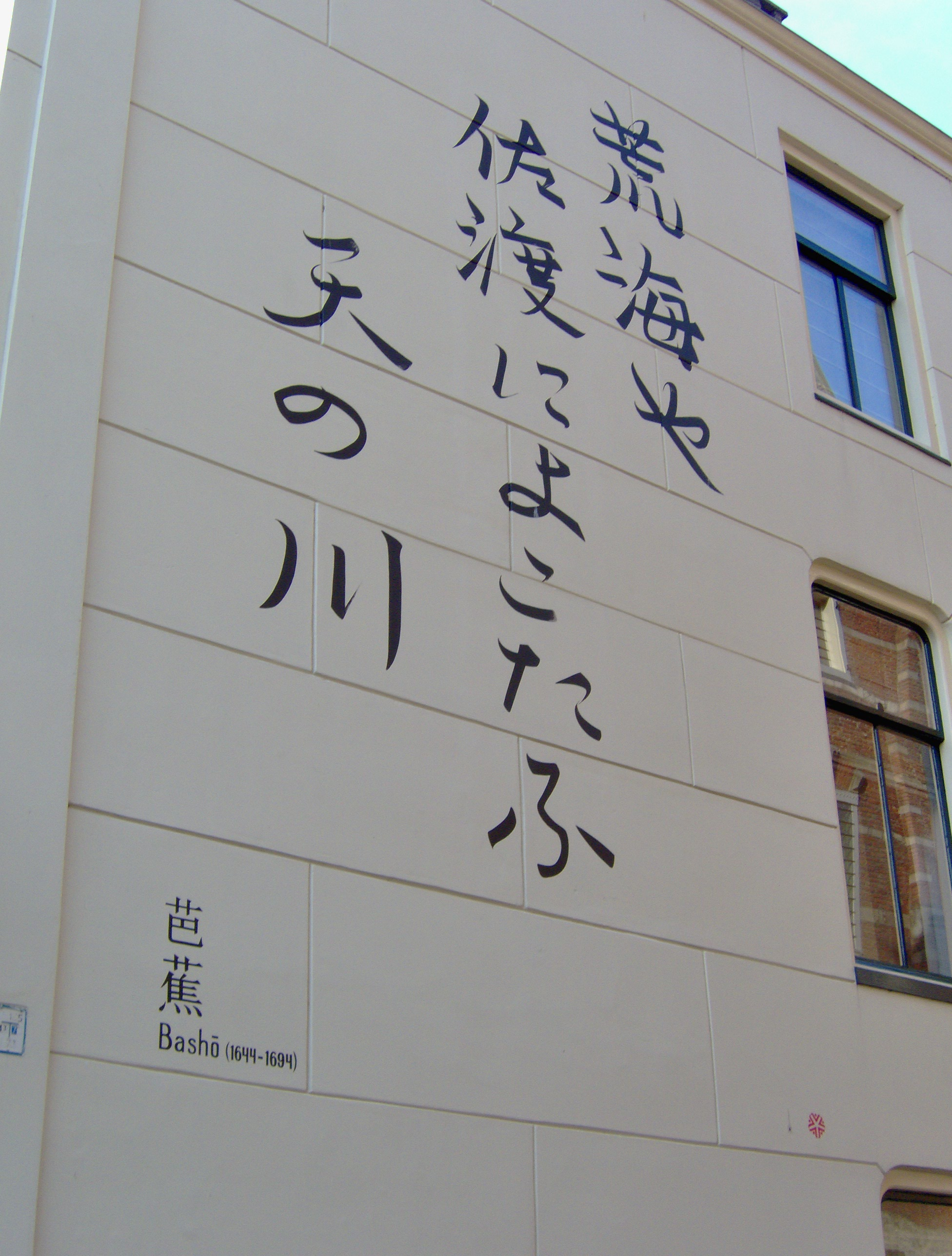
Bashō

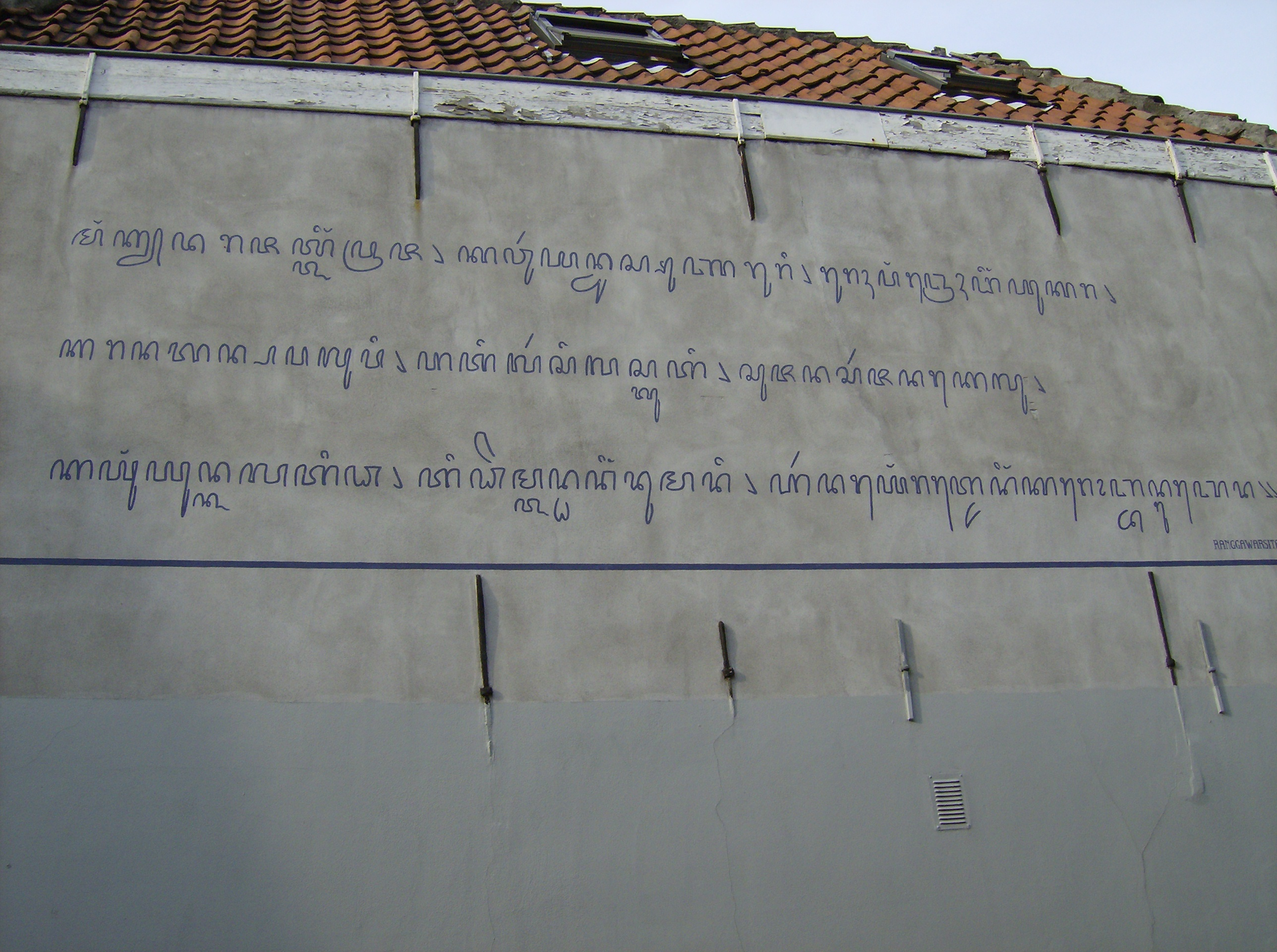
Ranggawarsita

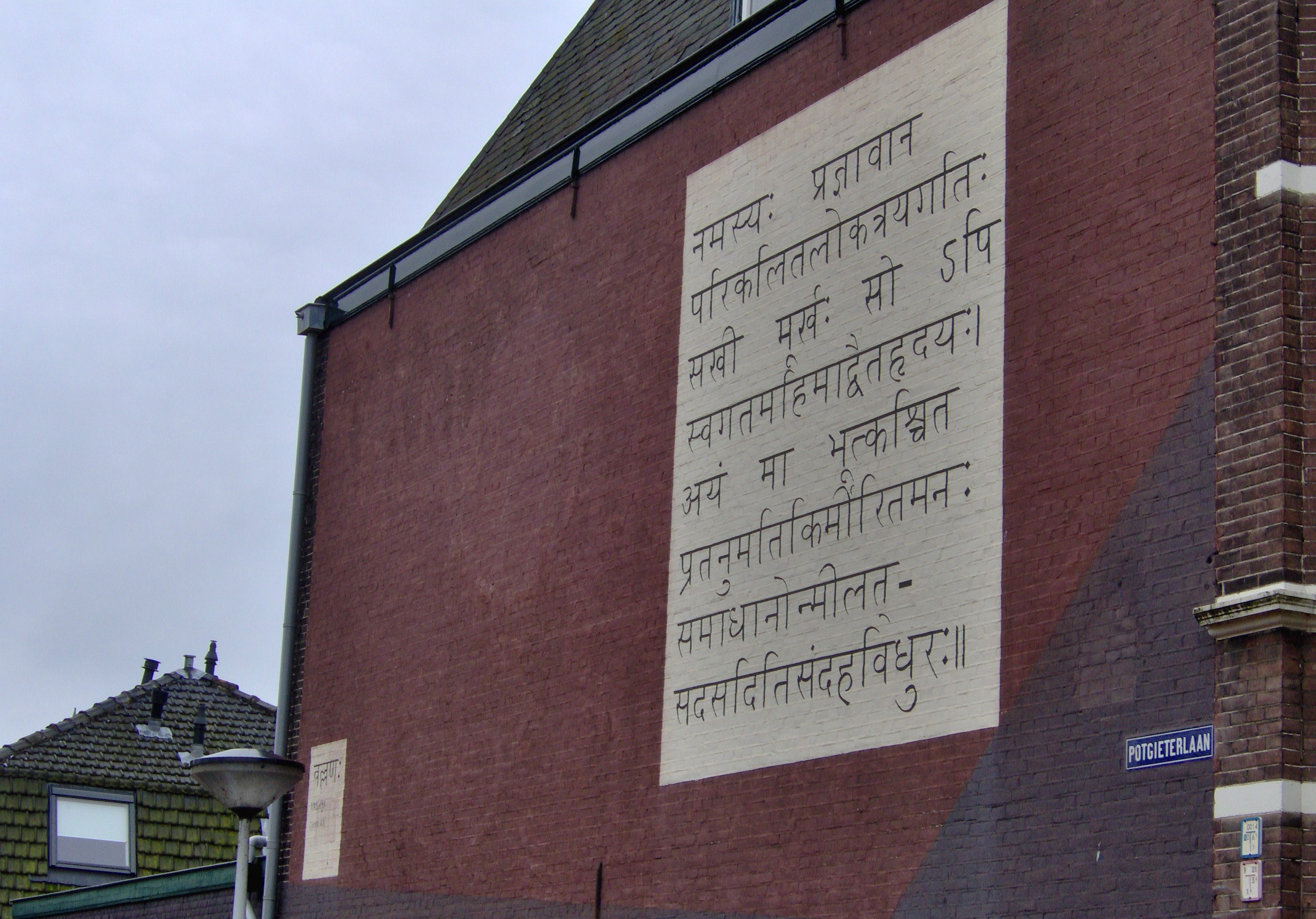
Vallana

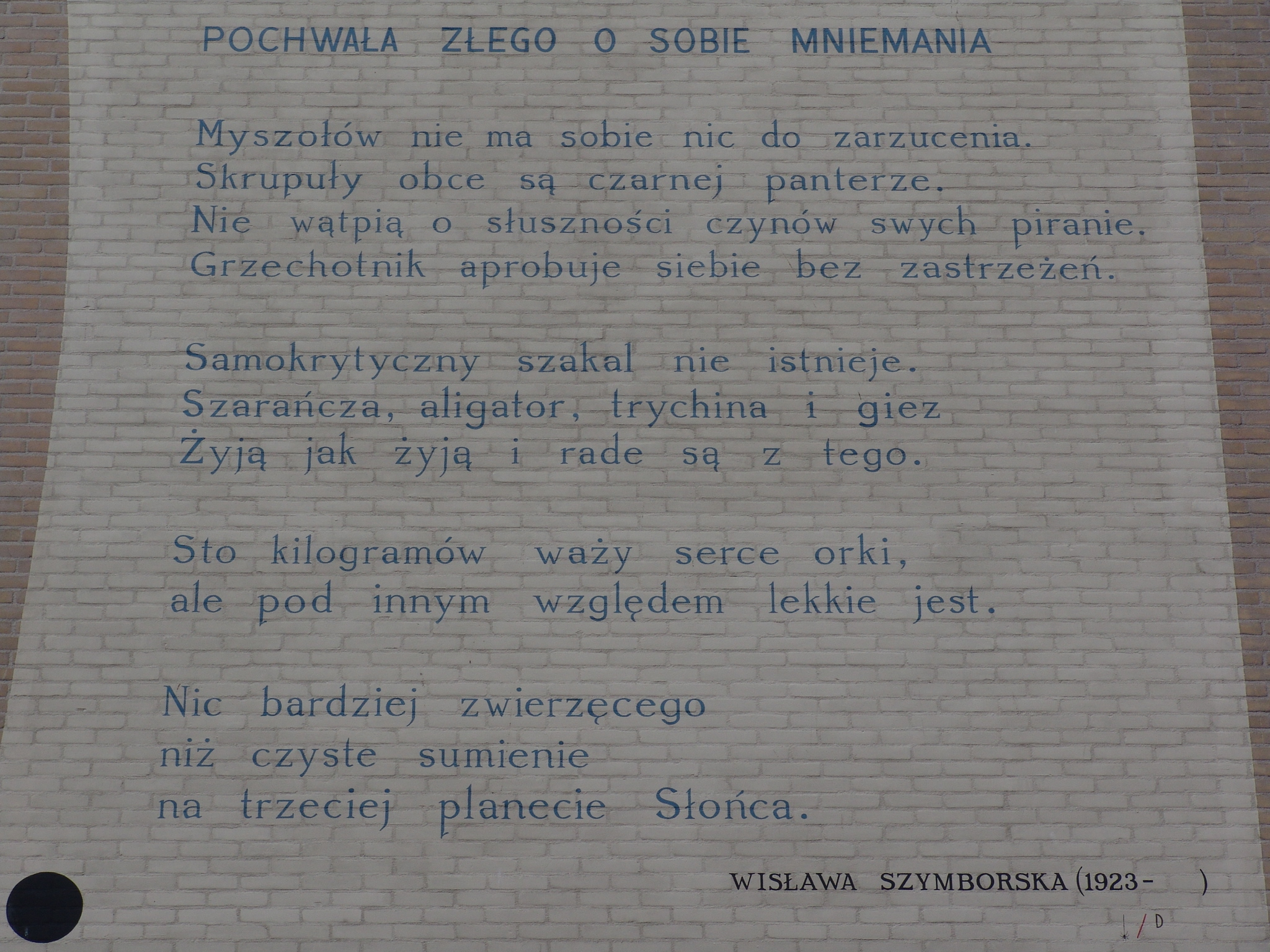
Wisława Szymborska

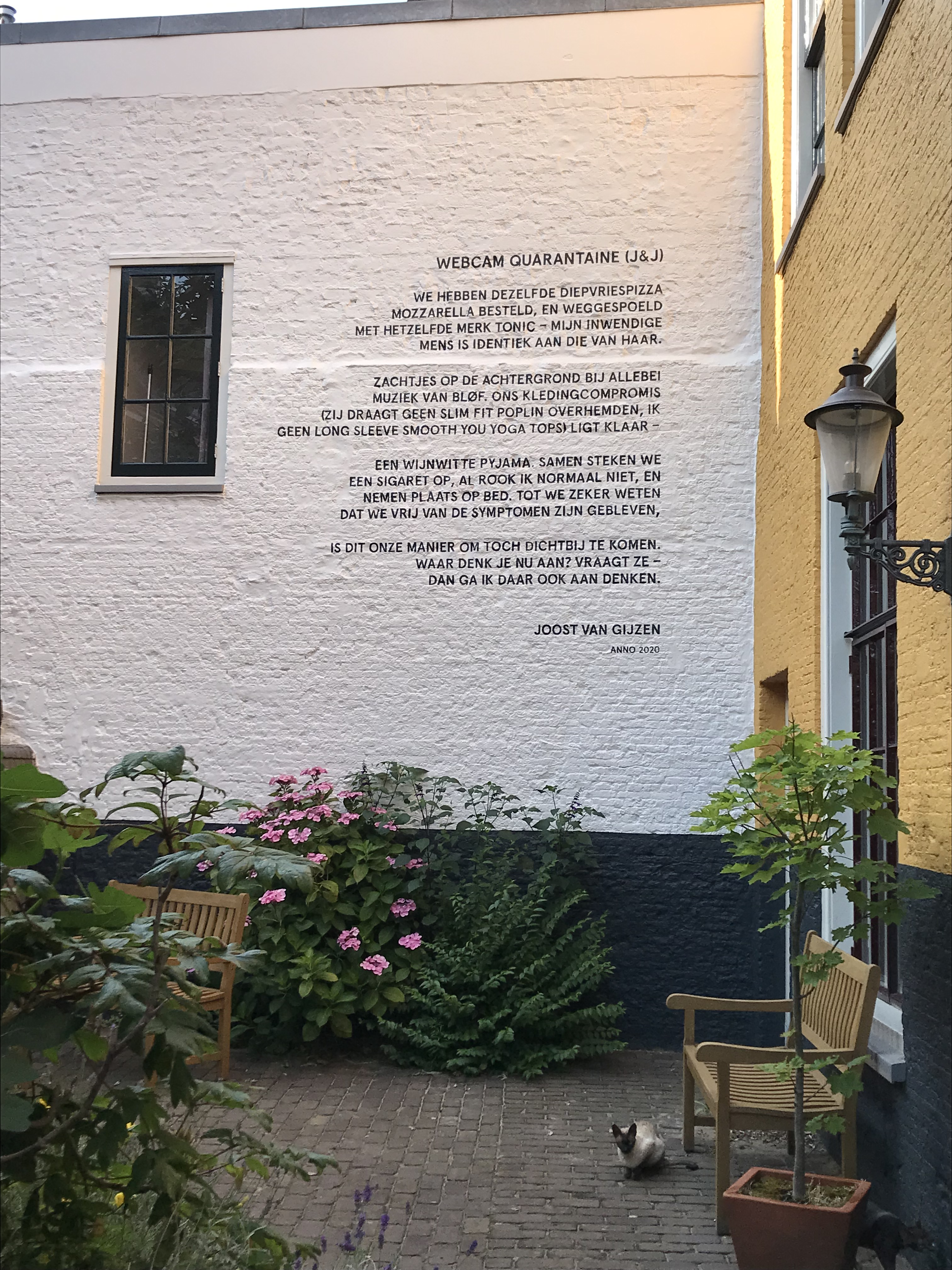
Joost van Gijzen

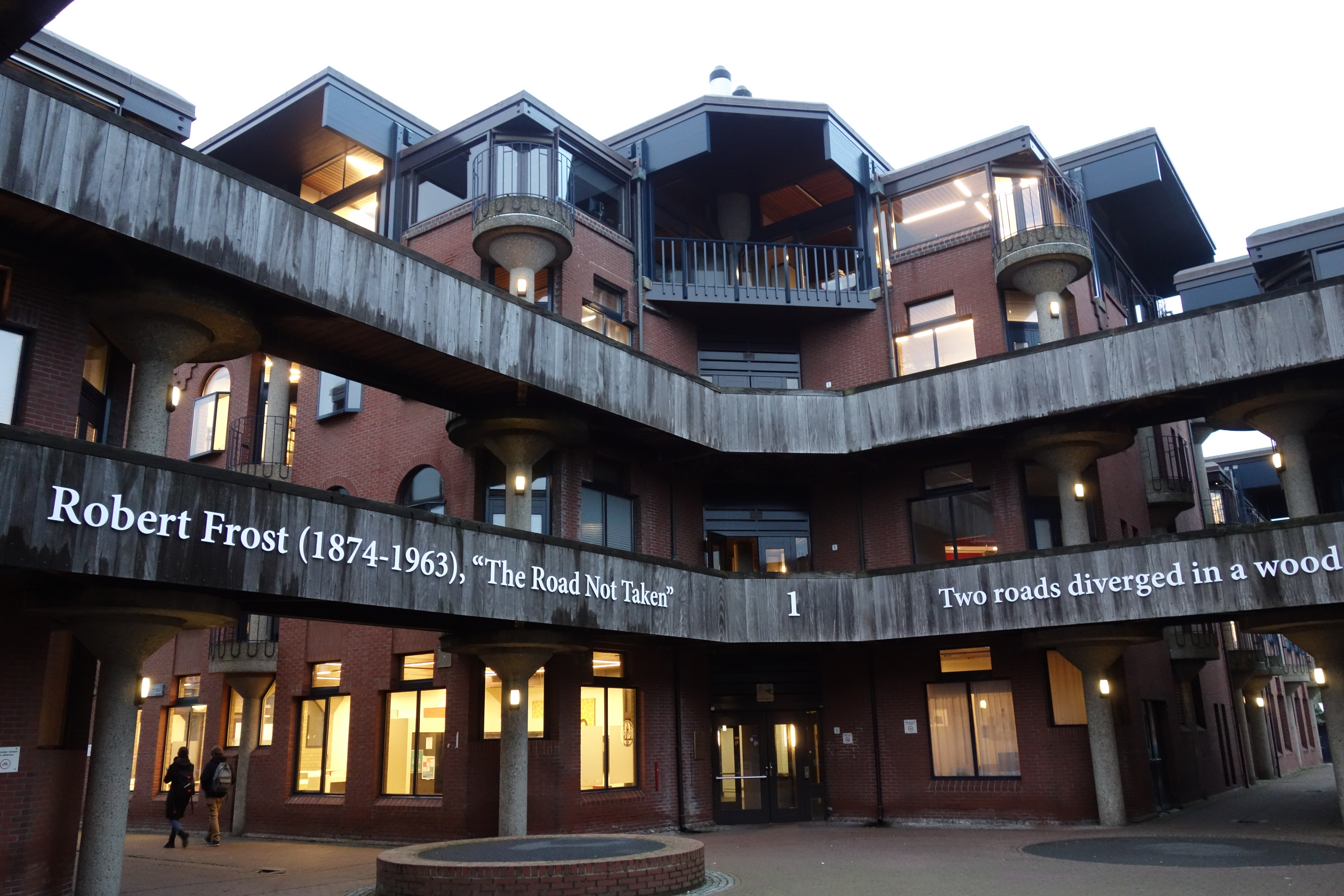
Robert Frost

== Influence ==
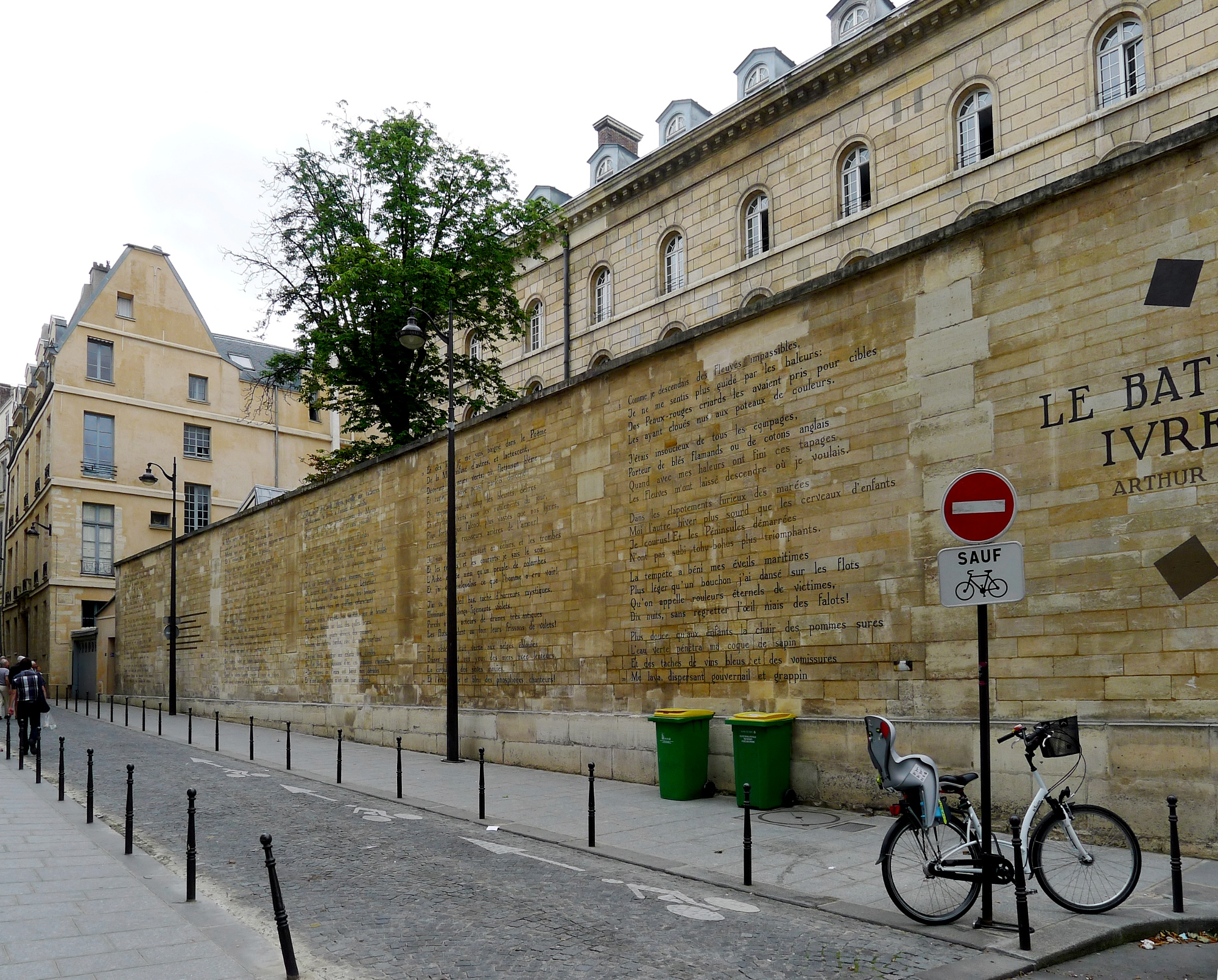
The poem Le bateau ivre on a wall in Paris

Based on the success of the Leiden poetry project, wall poems have also been painted in several other Dutch cities. In 2004 the Dutch embassy to Bulgaria launched a similar project in Sofia, and in 2012 the Tegen-Beeld foundation collaborated with the International Society of Friends of Rimbaud to paint a poem by Arthur Rimbaud, "Le Bateau ivre", on a government building in the 6th arrondissement of Paris. In 2012 a poem by Marsman was painted on a wall in Berlin.

Physicists Sense Jan van der Molen and Ivo van Vulpen were inspired by the poetry project to start the Leiden Wall Formulas project (Leidse Muurformules). They selected famous formulas to paint on walls in Leiden, to celebrate the city's history of contributions to physics. Tegen-Beeld, the creators of the original poetry project, supported them by designing and painting the illustrations to accompany the formulas. This, in turn, inspired similar projects in other Dutch cities, including Utrecht.

== Publications ==
- Marleen van der Weij: Dicht op de muur. Gedichten in Leiden. Gemeente Leiden, Dienst Bouwen en Wonen, 1996. ISBN 9080139580 (2nd ed.: 1996, 3rd ed.: 1997). 6th, rev. ed.: Burgersdijk & Niermans, Leiden, 2000. ISBN 9075089082 [Description of the first 43 poems].
- Marleen van der Weij: Dicht op de muur 2. Gedichten in Leiden. Burgersdijk & Niermans, Leiden, 2005. ISBN 9075089112 [Description of the poems 44-101]

== See also ==
- Poems on the Underground, a public display of poetry in the London Underground
