= Nordmark, Sweden =

Nordmark
- Location within Sweden
- Coordinates: 59°50′N 14°06′E
- Country: Sweden
- Province: Värmland
- County: Värmland County
- Municipality: Filipstad Municipality

Area
  - Total: 1.63 km^{2} (0.63 sq mi)

Population (31 December 2010)
  - Total: 225
  - Density: 138/km^{2} (360/sq mi)
- Time zone: UTC+1 (CET)
  - Summer (DST): UTC+2 (CEST)
- Climate: Dfb

Nordmark is a locality situated in Filipstad Municipality, Värmland County, Sweden with 225 inhabitants in 2010.
