= Seiichi Niikuni =

Japanese writer

- Born: 7 December 1925; Sendai, Japan
- Died: 23 August 1977 (aged 51); Tokyo, Japan
- Occupation: Poet
- Writing career
- Period: 1952 - 1977
- Genres: Concrete poetry, visual poetry, calligraphic poetry, aural poetry
- Notable works: Ame (1966), Kawa mata wa Shū (1966)
- Literary movement: Concrete poetry

Seiichi Niikuni (新国誠一, Niikuni Seiichi; December 7, 1925 – August 23, 1977) was a Japanese poet and painter. He was one of the foremost pioneers of the international avant-garde concrete poetry movement, creating works of calligraphic, visual and aural poetry. He is recognized as one of the most important poets of recent times in Japanese and German textbooks.

It is said that during his later years, he started to prefer the old kanji orthography form of his name, 新國誠一.

== Life ==
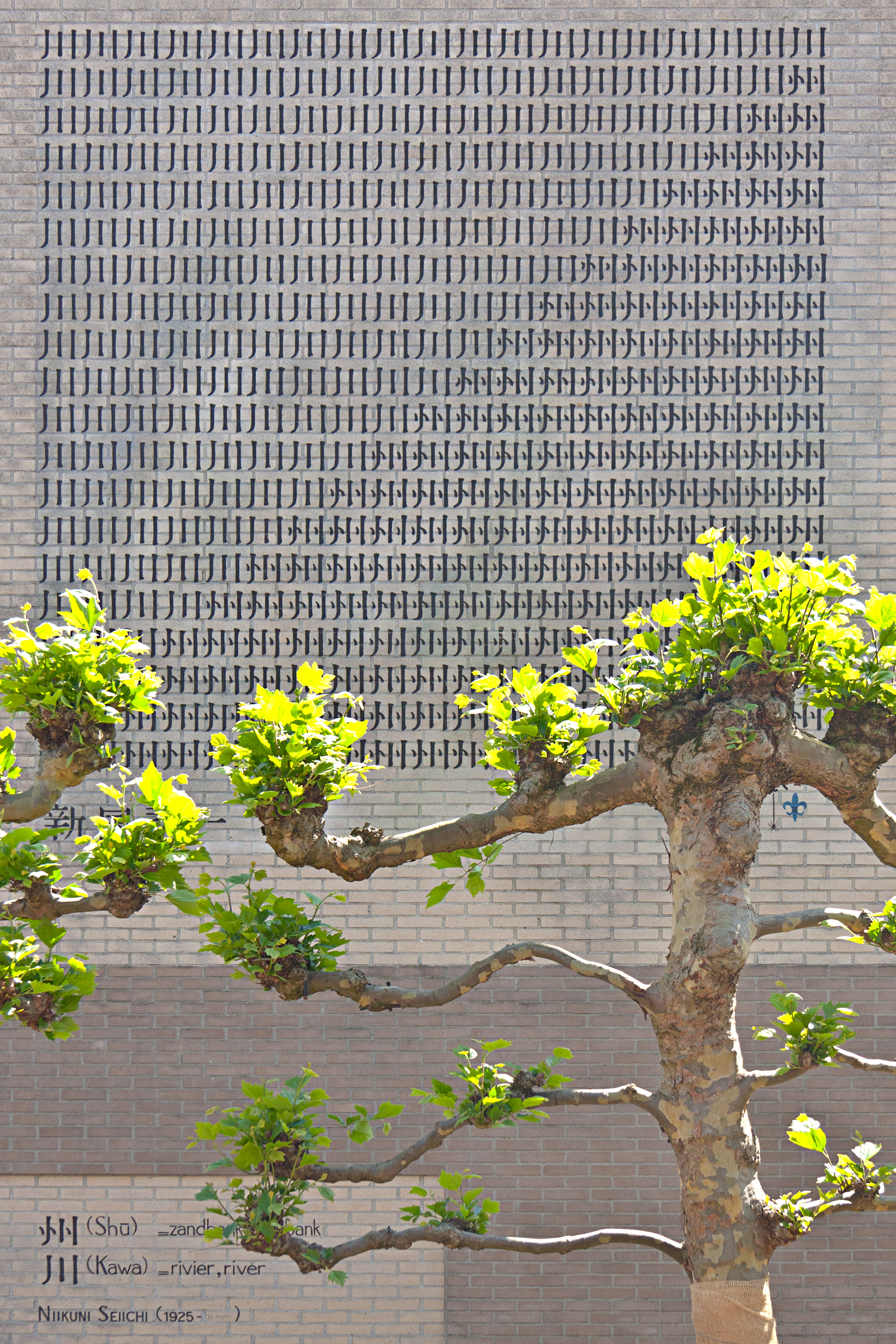
Kawa mata wa Shū (1966) displayed as a wall poem in Leiden, The Netherlands

=== Time in Sendai ===
Niikuni was born on December 7, 1925, in Sendai, Miyagi Prefecture, Japan. He entered the Sendai Technical School (now Sendai Technical High School) and studied architecture. After graduating from high school, he entered the Tohoku Gakuin University to study English literature and graduated from there in 1951.

In 1952 he began his career as a poet in earnest by joining a circle that published the poetry magazine Hyōga (氷河, lit. "glacier"). In the fifth issue of this magazine, he published his first poem called Urei wo Paipu ni Tsumete (うれいをパイプにつめて).

In 1960 he left Hyōga and joined Bungei Tōhoku (文芸東北). The motifs and audiovisual presentation that he would later become famous for, could already be seen in the works he submitted to Bungei Tōhoku. At the same time he was also a contributor for the Kahoku Shimpo (河北新報 Kahoku Shinpō) newspaper. He was already titled a poet and a painter at that time.

=== Moving to Tokyo and Zero-on ===
In 1962, Niikuni would publish a magazine called Tama (球) with two other poets he met while contributing to Bungei Tōhoku. The same year, in the fall he remarked that "people in Sendai just don't understand" and decided to move to Tokyo. He worked for a while at a design studio, and moved on to work for an NHK art department. He also married painter Kiyo Miura (三浦喜代 Miura Kiyo) the same year.

In 1963 he published the poetry anthology Zero-on (0音). A limited run of 300 copies, it was but an ordinary and simplistic book of no more than 48 pages. The title Zero-on was picked by his wife Kiyo from a list of several candidate names.

=== Founding of ASA and international attention ===
In 1964, Niikuni participated in the E. E. Cummings study group held in Yukinobu Kagiya's house, and met Yasuo Fujitomi while there. On June 4, he established an association called the Association of Study of Arts or ASA (芸術研究協会 Geijutsu Kenkyū Kyōkai) with Fujitomi with the objective of exploring and experimenting with concrete poetry. They published a namesake magazine ASA and in it introduced both Japanese and foreign concrete poetry, and also translated poems by Haroldo de Campos into Japanese. Fujitomi would also introduce the Brazilian concrete poetry group Noigandres' (es) member Luis Carlos Vinholes to Niikuni, and Vinholes in turn introduced the French poet Pierre Garnier (fr) to Niikuni. Niikuni would later send Zero-on to Garnier.

In 1966, Niikuni and Garnier published a collective poetry work together called Nichifutsu Shishū (日仏詩集) in France. Furthermore, in 1969 he was asked to and displayed his works at the German Visual Poetry exhibition at the Kunstsammlung Nordrhein-Westfalen. Requests from abroad to display his works kept increasing, and Niikuni gradually started to set his sights on foreign exhibitions. In 1974, he held a one-man exhibition at the Whitechapel Art Gallery in London.

=== Later years ===
From an early age, Niikuni had chest ailments and was constantly worried about his health. He was reportedly very happy to reach the age of 50, but would succumb to a sudden illness only two years later on August 23, 1977. He died in his home in Tokyo at the age of 52 (kazoedoshi). The publication of ASA also came to an end, with the seventh issue published in 1974 remaining as the last issue.

== Works ==
=== Modernism in the beginning ===
Niikuni started to write poetry on the side while attending school, and until he was in his twenties he would write not experimental poetry but lyrical poetry. The effect of Sakutarō Hagiwara could be seen in these works, and Niikuni also admitted himself that Hagiwara was his starting point. Niikuni also wrote that he paid attention to the works of Shirō Murano and Junzaburō Nishiwaki. In addition, he was fascinated by surrealism, new objectivity and existentialism among others.

=== From metaphors to analogies ===
As Japan was faced the loss in the second World War, old values were uprooted and Niikuni started to question the meaning of words and metaphors in poems. In particular, he read Junzaburō Nishiwaki's Chō-genjitsu-shugi-shiron (超現実主義詩論) and found the idea of poems being metaphorical limiting and empty. Thereafter, he began to thoroughly strip words to their barest form, and to reappropriate words' meaning into poetry that was constructed out of shapes and sounds. However, he was not able to immediately move from the modernism of Nishiwaki and Hagiwara, but took a number of years of hesitation to be able to gradually move to visual and aural poetry. With this transition, Niikuni did not completely reject metaphors, but included metaphor-like modernism and on top of it pursued poetry's essence in analogies. Furthermore, as was already visible from his works at the time of Hyōga, Niikuni was particular about carnal expression such as using sexual kanji like 男女 (danjo, men and women) and 唇 (kuchibiru, lips).

=== Zero-on ===
Stéphane Mallarmé's Un coup de dés

Niikuni would first present the concept of visual and aural poetry in 1963 in Zero-on (0音). The work was divided into two parts, the first half consisting of calligraphic poetry and second half being aural poetry. A note calling readers to read the poems aloud accompanied the first half.

The calligraphic poetry in the first half was mainly constructed of kanji of varying sizes, hiragana and katakana characters, that were placed on pages with special emphasis on the spatiality that they created, being close to an experiment in visual poetry. The aural poetry in the second half was, as the name implies, poetry for listening, exemplified by a public performance of reading aloud of the poems in December 1963. This experiment was witnessed by the composer Yasunao Tone among others.

The works in Zero-on, especially those of calligraphic poetry, that were created out of spatially emphasized characters, are thought to be the influenced by the French poet Stéphane Mallarmé's Un coup de dés. Influences by John Cage and twelve-tone music are also noted.

Vinholes advocated the importance of audio to Niikuni, after which Niikuni started to actively experiment with aural poetry. At the same time, reel to reel audio technology and phototypesetting were developed, and are seen to have had an effect on the style of expression in Zero-on and later works.

=== ASA and going international ===
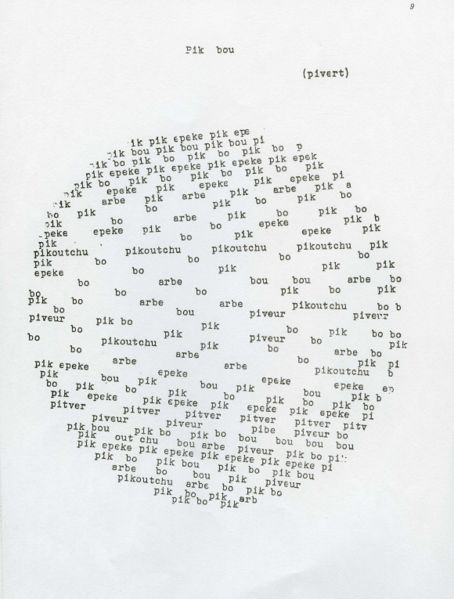
Pierre Garnier's Pik bou

Although at the time of Zero-on Niikuni was not yet aware of the international avant-garde poetry movement, he arrived at the same methodology as the concrete poetry movement in countries that used the alphabet. When Pierre Garnier saw Zero-on, he was amazed at how similar works they strove for and produced although the languages they spoke differed so much. This was the beginning of their friendship. Later, Garnier and Niikuni collaborated on Nichifutsu Shishū (日仏詩集), producing works such as the Micropoem. Niikuni was noted abroad as an example of a writer that relied on ideographs (kanji), and requests to display his works kept coming in. Niikuni progressed to methods like graphic design and emphasizing communication after Zero-on, but he would not budge from expressing through kanji characters.

In ASA Niikuni presented his most notable works, such as Kawa mata wa Shū (川または州) and Ame (雨). He would place characters as if they were a surface, bringing forth the visuality of both the complete surface and individual characters at the same time. In Yami (闇), the character for sound (音) would be seen breaking away from the character of darkness (闇). Niikuni also started using the Gothic typeface instead of Minchō. It is thought that this kind of breaking kanji into its parts and varying the shape of characters was done with Western audiences in mind.

Also from around this time, his works started incorporating explanatory notes in English about the meaning of the kanji characters used. For example, Uso (嘘) in 1966 explained that "(口)=mouth (虚)=void (嘘)=lie". This was in response to requests from abroad.

Niikuni himself disliked the fact that these visual poems were regarded as being borderline art, and also denied that they were based on photography. However, in actuality his works were often talked about from the point of view of there being a relation between the pictures and poems, and it was often opined that it cannot be avoided that poems that utilized spatiality approach the realm of art.

== Reception ==
Niikuni rejected the mix of poetry and other fields of expression, and insisted on expressing himself only through words. However, in the 1970s, the concrete poetry movement started adding elements of visual arts, moving away from purely word-based concretism and becoming closer to visual poetry. After the sudden passing away of Niikuni, the visual and concrete poetry movements in Japan would come to an end and Niikuni's works were soon forgotten. Niikuni's works gathered some interest in the fields of design and arts, but they never got recognition as works of poetry. However, 31 years after Niikuni's death, in 2008, a retrospective exhibition was held at the National Museum of Art in Osaka, along with the publishing of a compilation of Niikuni's works, garnering the larger public's attention once again. The aesthetic of using characters as material was noted to be related to ASCII art in a fundamental way.

== Bibliography ==
=== Poetry anthologies and writings ===
- Zero-on (0音) (1963, Shōshinsha)
  - This was the only poetry anthology released while Niikuni was still alive.
- Nichifutsu Shishū (日仏詩集) (1966, published by André Silvaire)
  - Collaborative work with Pierre Garnier.
- Niikuni Seiichi Shishū (新國誠一詩集) (1979)
  - A compilation published by Yasuo Fujitomi, Hiroo Uemura and Shōji Yoshizawa.
- Niikuni Seiichi works 1952-1977 (新国誠一 works 1952-1977) (2008, Shichōsha)
  - In addition to including the entirety of Zero-on, this compilation also includes aural poetry.

=== Others ===
==== Major works ====
- Kan (姦) (1965)
- Kawa mata wa Shū (川または州) (1966)
- Yami (闇) (1966)
- Ame (雨) (1966)
- Hansen (反戦) (1970)
- Sawaru (触る) (1972)

==== Critique and essays ====
- Kūkan Shugi Tōkyō Sengensho (空間主義東京宣言書) in the 3rd issue of ASA
- Metafā no Koto (メタファーのこと) in the 29th issue of Mugen (無限) (August 1972)

==== EP records ====
- Kūkan Shugi no Onseishi (空間主義の音声詩) released by Columbia in 1971
  - This was an EP record of aural poetry. Pierre Garnier's wife Ilse also joined in the making of the record. In 2000, Chabashira Records re-released it in CD format.
1. Jinruigaku (人類学) (Pierre Garnier)
2. Kuchibiru to Shitto (くちびるとしっと) (Seiichi Niikuni)

== See also ==
- Yasuo Fujitomi

== Sources ==
- 新国誠一 works 1952-1977. 思潮社. 2008. ISBN 978-4-7837-3099-6.
- 建畠哲; 城戸朱理; 金澤一志 (February 2009). "いま、新国誠一 形象と意味のはざまで". 現代詩手帖. 52 (2). 思潮社: 10–24.
- 藤富保男 (February 2009). "新国誠一との出会い". 現代詩手帖. 52 (2). 思潮社: 34–35.
- ヤリタミサコ (February 2009). "新国誠一は、新しい". 現代詩手帖. 52 (2). 思潮社: 51.
- 吉沢庄次 (February 2009). "甦った新国誠一". 現代詩手帖. 52 (2). 思潮社: 64–66.
- 金澤一志編 (February 2009). "新国誠一略年譜". 現代詩手帖. 52 (2). 思潮社: 67–69.
