= Louis Oliver (poet) =

Native American poet

- Wotkoce
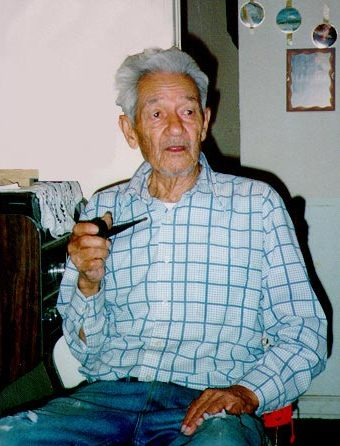
- Louis Oliver
- Born: April 9, 1904; Coweta, Indian Territory
- Died: May 10, 1991 (aged 87); Muskogee, Oklahoma
- Education: Bacone College
- Occupation: writer
- Writing career
- Language: English, Muscogee
- Notable awards: Alexander Posey Literary Award (1987)

Louis Oliver (April 9, 1904 – May 10, 1991), also known as Little Coon or Wotkoce Okisce, was a citizen of the Muscogee Nation and an American poet. His poetry combines themes of Muscogee oral history with an examination of intellectualism in the context of the Muscogee Nation.

== Early life and education ==
Oliver was born on April 9, 1904, in Coweta, Indian Territory, which became part of Oklahoma in 1907. His parents died when he was young and he was raised by relatives in Okfuskee. He studied at the Euchee Indian School and then Bacone College, where he graduated in 1926. Unlike many of his contemporaries, he earned a diploma in 1926, an accomplishment that alienated some other Muscogee who accused him of "capitulating to the White Man's ways".

== Career ==
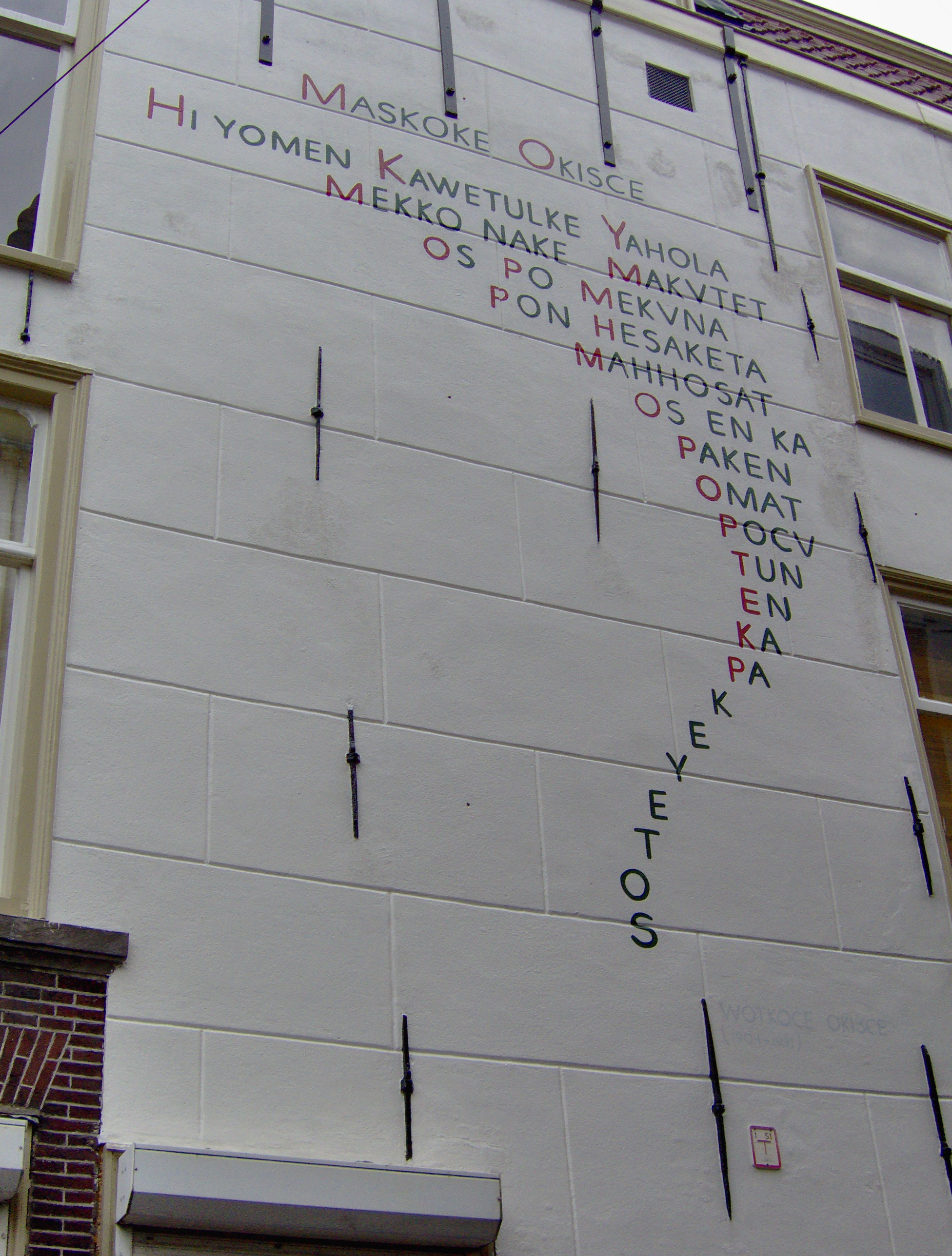
Maskoke Okisce (Creek Fable) on display in Leiden

While living among the Cherokee in Tahlequah, Oklahoma, in the early 1980s, Oliver joined a writing group that included several published authors, and moved away from the more classical European forms of poetry that he had been practicing until then. He became the author of two books of poetry, Caught in a willow net: poems and stories (Greenfield Review Press, 1983) and Chasers of the Sun: Creek Indian thoughts (Greenfield Review Press, 1990).

One of his poems, about and in the form of a tornado, is included in the Wall poems in Leiden outdoor poetry project in Leiden, Netherlands.

== Honors ==
In 1987, the Este Mvskoke Arts Council of the Muscogee people gave him their inaugural Alexander Posey Literary Award.

== Death ==
He died on May 10, 1991, in Muskogee, Oklahoma.
