= Filipstad =

- City
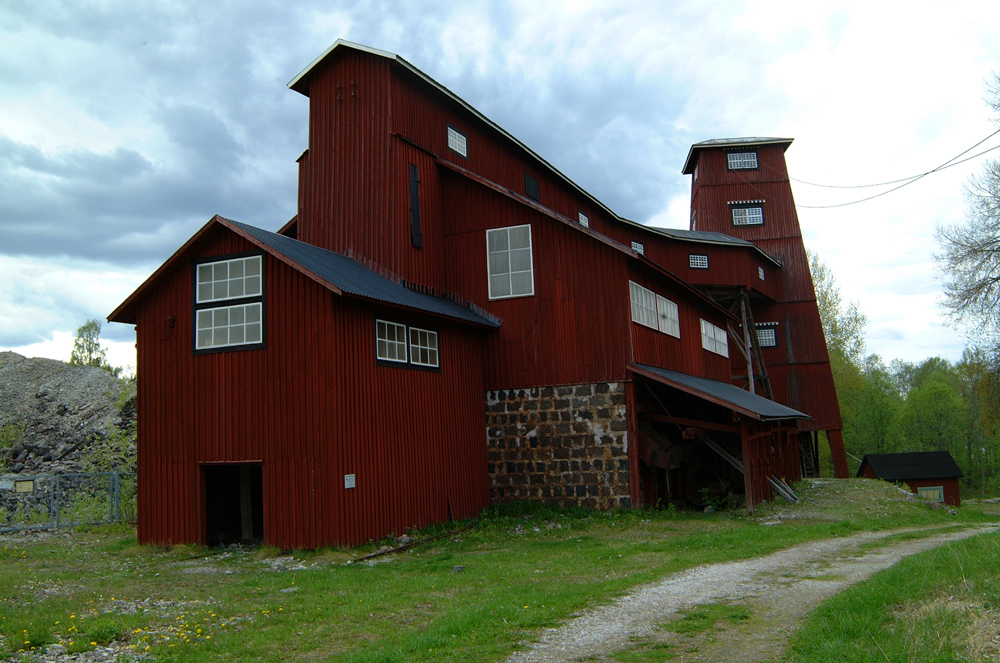
- Långban

- Location within Sweden
- Coordinates: 59°43′N 14°10′E
- Country: Sweden
- Province: Värmland
- County: Värmland County
- Municipality: Filipstad Municipality

Area
  - Total: 6.51 km^{2} (2.51 sq mi)

Population (31 December 2019)
  - Total: 10,644
  - Density: 925/km^{2} (2,400/sq mi)
- Time zone: UTC+1 (CET)
  - Summer (DST): UTC+2 (CEST)
- Climate: Dfb

Filipstad is a locality and the seat of Filipstad Municipality, Värmland County, Sweden, with 10,644 inhabitants in 2019.

Filipstad was granted city privileges in 1611 by Charles IX of Sweden, who named it after his son Duke Carl Philip (1601–1622; younger brother of Gustavus Adolphus).

After a major fire destroyed forest and town in 1694, Filipstad lost its privileges, as it was believed the remaining forest would not be sustainable if the town were to be rebuilt. In 1835 the rights were regranted. The local government acts of 1862 made the very privileges obsolete, but the title stad (city) remained in use until the municipal reform of 1971. Since then Filipstad is the seat of the larger Filipstad Municipality. Filipstad is, despite its small population, for historical reasons, normally still referred to as a city. Statistics Sweden, however, only counts localities with more than 10,000 inhabitants as cities.

At Filipstad, there is Klockarhöjdenmasten, a 330 metres tall guyed mast used for FM/TV-broadcasting.

Wasabröd, the largest crisp bread manufacturer in the world, has one of its two factories in Filipstad, the other being in Celle, Germany.

== Notable natives ==
- Rasmus Asplund, ice hockey player in NHL
- John Ericsson, inventor
- Nils Ericsson, engineer
- Nils Ferlin, poet
- Anders Forsbrand, golfer
- Edvin Kallstenius, composer
- Magnus Norman, tennis player

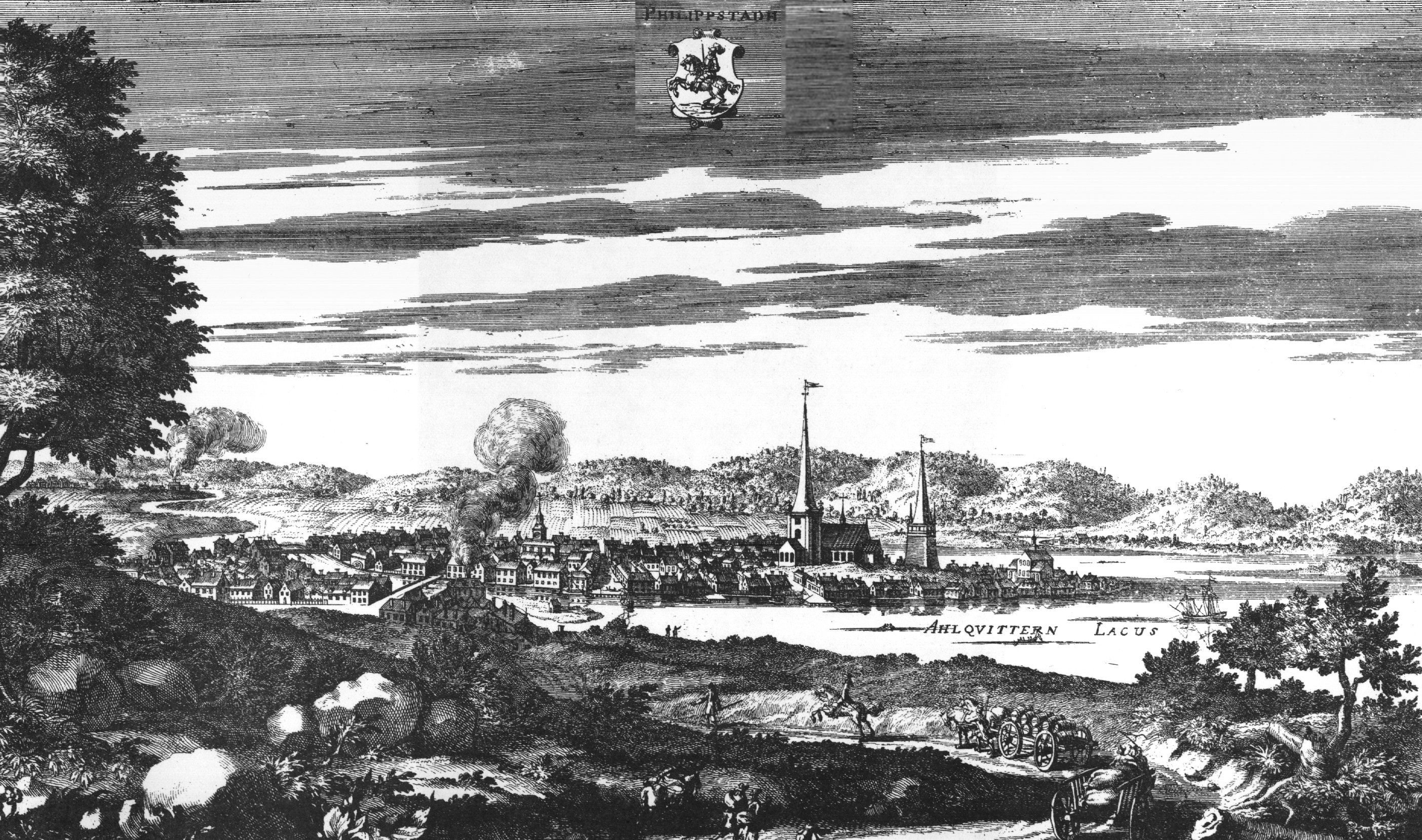
Filipstad around 1700, in the work Suecia antiqua et hodierna.

== See also ==
- Yngen lake
