= Nils Ferlin =

Swedish poet and lyricist (1898–1961)

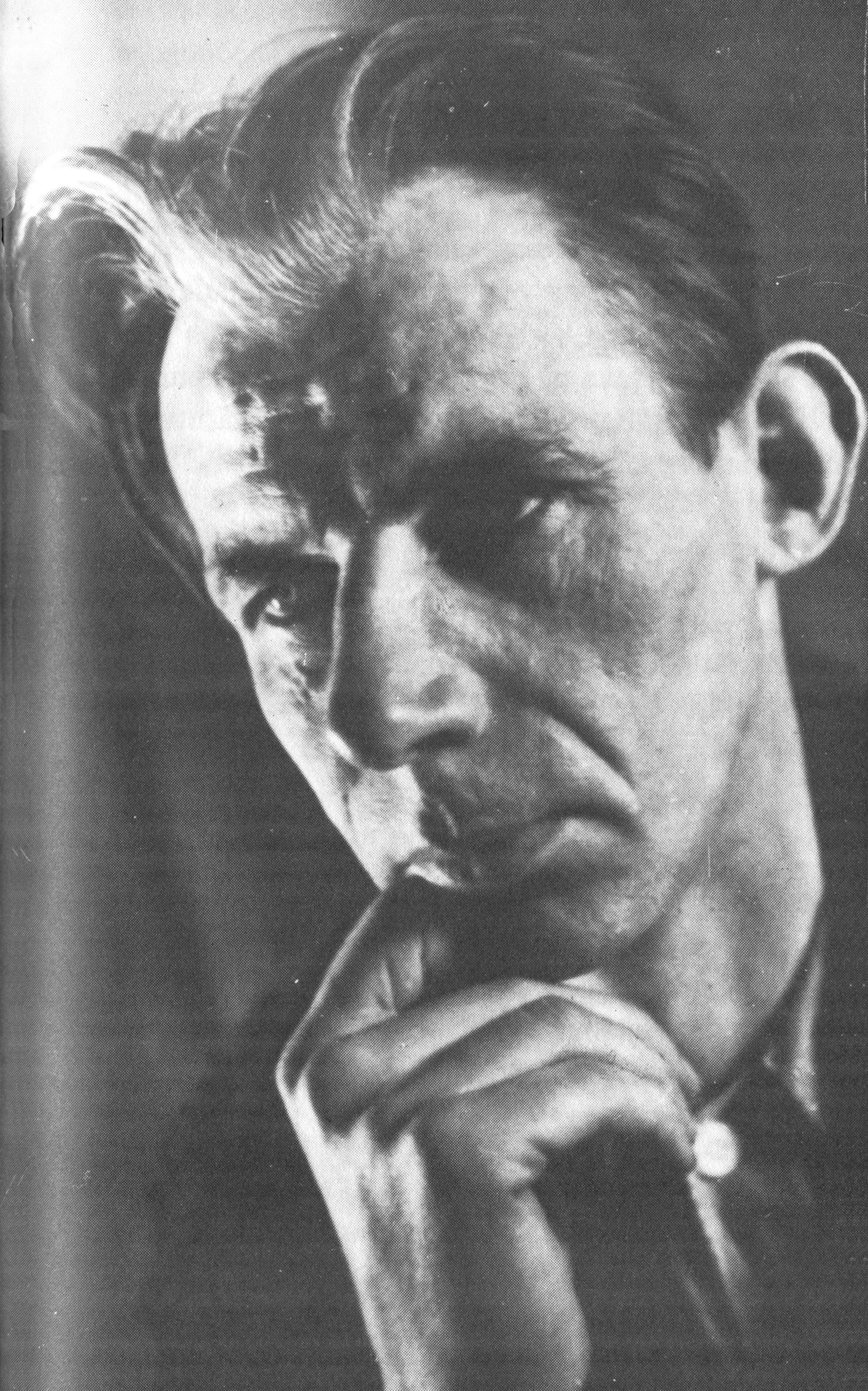
- Born: Nils Johan Einar Ferlin; 11 December 1898; Karlstad, Sweden
- Died: 21 October 1961 (aged 62); Uppsala, Sweden
- Occupations: poet, lyricist
- Spouse: Henny Lönnqvist

Nils Ferlin (11 December 1898 – 21 October 1961) was a Swedish poet and lyricist.

== Biography ==
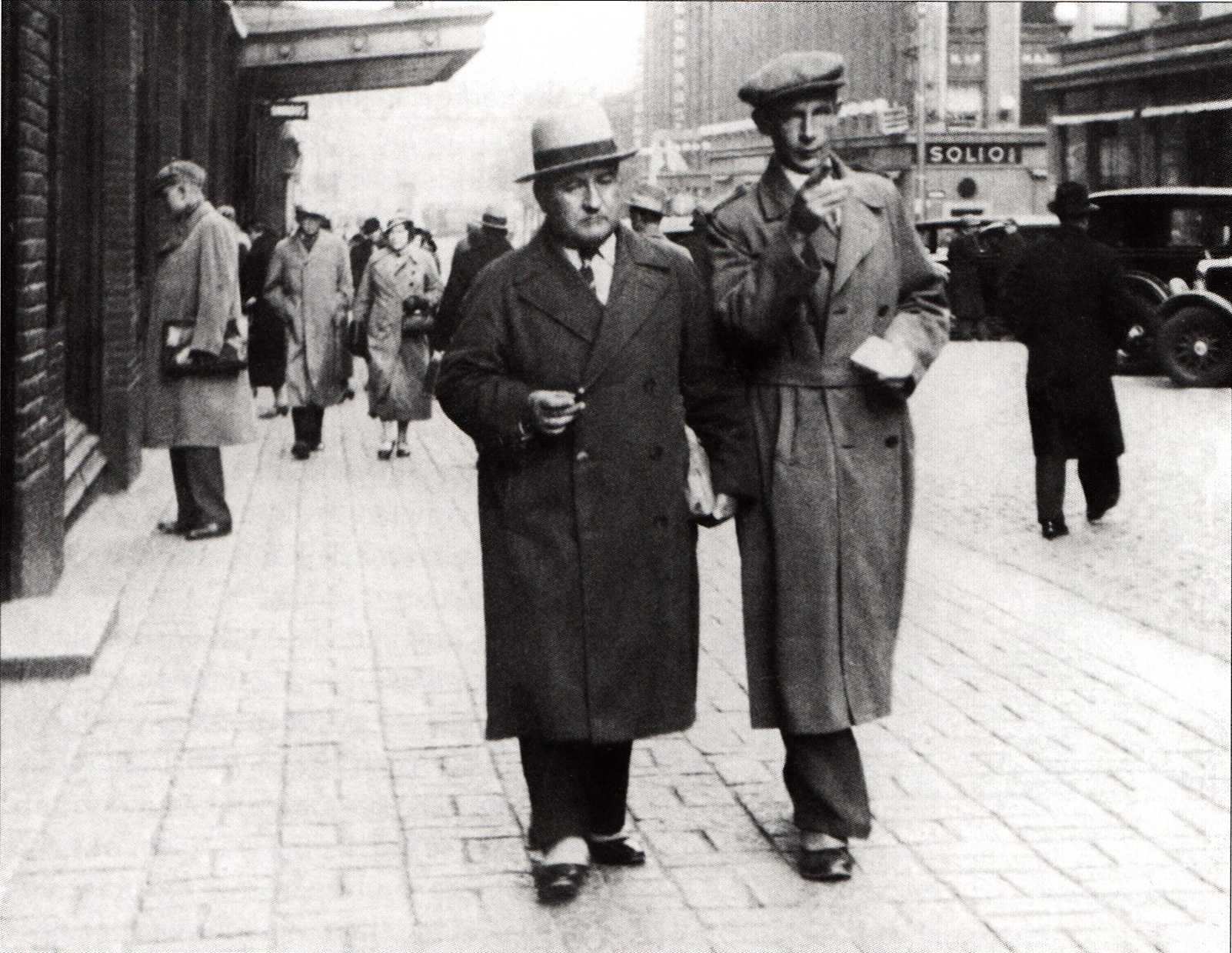
Ferlin (right) and Finnish poet Elmer Diktonius in Helsinki, 1936.

Nils Ferlin was born in Karlstad, Värmland, where his father worked at Nya Wermlands-Tidningen. In 1908, the family moved to Filipstad, and his father started his own newspaper. His father passed away the following year, and the family relocated from their comfortable home to a modest dwelling in the industrial district so that Ferlin could complete his education. He graduated at the age of sixteen.

Ferlin had a minor career as an actor and debuted at the age of seventeen in Salomé by Oscar Wilde. He continued his career with a traveling theater company.

Although many of Ferlin's poems are melancholic, they are not without humor. Several were set to music and became popular songs such as En valsmelodi, an attack on the music industry. Ferlin sold over 300,000 volumes of his poetry during his lifetime. His lasting appeal is partly attributed to his vivid portrayal of central Stockholm before urban renewal and his association with the popular culture that flourished there then.

Several statues of Nils Ferlin have been erected in Sweden: one in Filipstad of him sitting on a park bench, one in the Karlstad city square of him standing on a table, and one near Klara kyrka in Stockholm of him lighting a cigarette.

Ferlin’s lyrics have been translated into English by Martin S. Allwood, Fred Lane, Thord Fredenholm and Roger Hinchliffe.

== Bibliography ==
- 1930 En döddansares visor (Songs of a death dancer)
- 1933 Barfotabarn (Barefoot children)
- 1937 Lars och Lisa i Stockholm (Lars and Lisa in Stockholm)
- 1938 Goggles
- 1944 Med många kulörta lyktor (With plenty of colored lanterns)
- 1951 Kejsarens papegoja (The emperor's parrot)
- 1957 Från mitt ekorrhjul (From my squirrel wheel)

== See also ==
- Swedish ballad tradition
