= Filipstad Municipality =

Filipstad Municipality Filipstads kommun
- Municipality
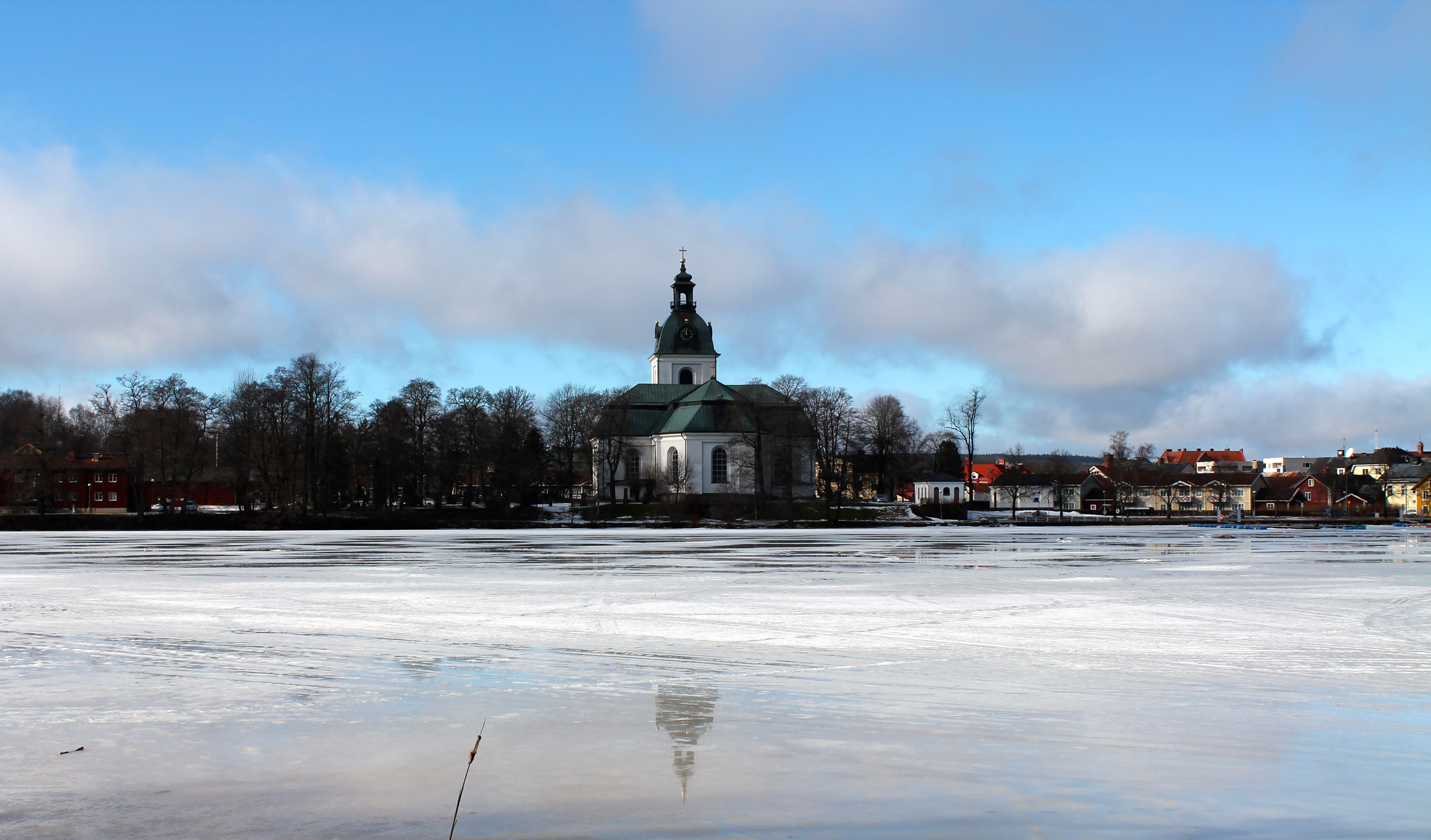

- Coat of arms

- Coordinates: 59°43′N 14°10′E
- Country: Sweden
- County: Värmland County
- Seat: Filipstad

Area
  - Total: 1,711.71 km^{2} (660.89 sq mi)
  - Land: 1,534.03 km^{2} (592.29 sq mi)
  - Water: 177.68 km^{2} (68.60 sq mi)
- Area as of 1 January 2014.

Population (30 June 2025)
  - Total: 9,727
  - Density: 6.341/km^{2} (16.42/sq mi)
- Time zone: UTC+1 (CET)
  - Summer (DST): UTC+2 (CEST)
- ISO 3166 code: SE
- Province: Värmland and Dalarna
- Municipal code: 1782
- Website: www.filipstad.se

Filipstad Municipality (Swedish: Filipstads kommun) is a municipality in Värmland County in west central Sweden. Its seat is located in the city of Filipstad.

The present municipality was created in 1971 when the City of Filipstad was merged with the rural municipalities of Kroppa, Rämmen and Värmlandsberg.

== Localities ==
With at least 200 inhabitants:

- Filipstad, 6,300 inhabitants (seat)
- Lesjöfors, 1,247 inhabitants
- Nykroppa, 1,020 inhabitants
- Persberg, 350 inhabitants
- Nordmark, 250 inhabitants

== Demographics ==
This is a demographic table based on Filipstad Municipality's electoral districts in the 2022 Swedish general election sourced from SVT's election platform, in turn taken from SCB official statistics.

In total there were 10,387 residents with 7,763 Swedish citizen adults eligible to vote. The political demographics were 46.5% for the left bloc and 52.3% for the right bloc. Filipstad is generally a low-income municipality, with low attainment of university degrees and about 22% were of foreign background. Indicators are in percentage points except population totals and income.

Location	Residents	Citizen adults	Left vote	Right vote	Employed	Swedish parents	Foreign heritage	Income SEK	Degree
Location			%	%					
Brattfors	464	367	39.6	57.8	86	93	7	23,622	20
Filipstads N	1,734	1,341	49.1	49.8	71	84	16	21,432	21
Filipstads S	1,751	1,250	44.8	54.4	72	74	26	22,890	20
Filipstads V-C	1,680	1,220	51.7	47.3	61	62	38	17,035	16
Filipstads Ö	1,638	1,221	41.5	57.8	77	81	19	23,520	22
Kroppa	887	688	45.0	53.1	68	78	22	19,462	17
Långban-Gåsborn	385	298	44.8	53.6	78	89	11	22,088	23
Nordmark	423	296	44.6	54.1	80	86	14	23,862	32
Persberg	436	332	39.6	58.5	75	84	16	23,129	24
Rämmen	988	750	54.3	44.4	76	80	20	20,115	17
Source: SVT
