= Nykroppa =

- Location within Sweden
- Coordinates: 59°37′20″N 14°18′0″E
- Country: Sweden
- Province: Värmland
- County: Värmland County
- Municipality: Filipstad Municipality

Area
  - Total: 2.45 km^{2} (0.95 sq mi)

Population (31 December 2010)
  - Total: 846
  - Density: 345/km^{2} (890/sq mi)
- Time zone: UTC+1 (CET)
  - Summer (DST): UTC+2 (CEST)
- Climate: Dfb

Nykroppa is a locality situated in Filipstad Municipality, Värmland County, Sweden with 846 inhabitants in 2010.

== Riksdag elections ==
Being an industrial village, Nykroppa has been dominated by the Social Democrats throughout its electoral history. With the population drastically declining from the 1970s onward, the political dynamics have shifted somewhat and in 2018 the Social Democrats fell a long way short of a majority for the first time in a parliamentary election in Kroppa.

Year	%	Votes	V	S	MP	C	L	KD	M	SD	NyD	Left	Right
1973	93.6	1,378	8.1	73.2		9.7	4.6	0.4	3.6			81.3	17.9
1976	93.6	1,367	5.0	74.2		11.4	4.5	0.3	4.5			79.2	20.4
1979	93.1	1,300	4.9	76.0		6.8	4.8	0.2	6.5			80.9	18.2
1982	91.0	1,216	5.5	78.7	1.0	4.8	2.5	0.7	6.9			84.2	14.1
1985	92.2	1,157	6.7	75.5	1.5	3.5	5.1		7.6			82.3	16.2
1988	86.4	1,063	8.8	72.2	3.9	3.7	4.7	0.6	6.0			84.9	14.4
1991	84.9	972	6.6	66.3	2.3	3.4	2.7	3.1	8.3		6.3	72.8	17.5
1994	85.4	946	9.1	73.7	2.3	2.7	1.7	1.4	7.9		1.0	85.1	13.7
1998	81.8	799	24.5	56.4	2.9	1.5	1.9	4.4	8.0			83.9	15.8
2002	76.1	677	14.2	60.0	3.0	3.2	3.4	5.6	7.4	1.5		77.1	19.6
2006	76.3	651	8.4	62.7	1.8	2.9	4.1	2.6	12.4	3.4		73.0	22.1
2010	81.7	623	7.9	56.7	4.5	1.9	2.9	2.1	15.4	7.1		69.0	22.3
2014	82.7	620	6.6	51.9	3.7	1.9	0.8	1.1	12.9	18.9		62.3	16.8
2018	82.8	582	6.2	42.3	1.5	3.6	2.1	2.9	13.1	26.6		53.6	44.7
