= Paasonen =

Paasonen is a Finnish surname. Notable people with the surname include:

- Aladár Paasonen (1898–1974), Finnish military officer
- Sakari Paasonen (1935–2020), Finnish sport shooter
- Jani Paasonen (born 1975), Finnish rally driver
- Susanna Paasonen (born 1975), Finnish feminist scholar
- Heikki Paasonen (linguist) (1865–1919), Finnish linguist and ethnographer
- Heikki Paasonen (born 1983), Finnish television presenter
