= Reino Hallamaa =

Finnish military radio operator

Reino Henrik Hallamaa
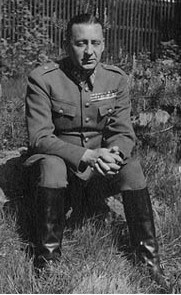
- Born: 12 November 1899; Tampere
- Died: 11 August 1979 (aged 79); Churriana, Spain
- Military career
- Allegiance: Finland
- Branch: Finnish Army
- Rank: Colonel
- Unit: Finnish Radio Intelligence
- Other work: Owner of construction company

Reino Henrik Hallamaa (12 November 1899 – 11 August 1979 in Churriana, Málaga, Spain) was a Finnish Colonel and developer and head of the Finnish Radio Intelligence during World War II.

== Early life ==
Reino Henrik Hallamaa was born in Tampere in 1899 to Juha and Aino Hummelin. After attending college in Helsinki he began working for the Finnish railroad, where one of his tasks was to fill out package lists of cargo arriving from Russia. In 1917 he began working as a signals telegraphist at the Helsinki Central railway station.

== Military career ==
Finland declared its independence in 1917, and the Finnish Civil War, known to the whites as Freedom War Vapaussota erupted in 1918. Hallamaa joined the whites in Seinäjoki. Here he was assigned to the Uudenmaan rakunapataljoona unit where he fought in the battles at Väärinmaja, Kuhmoinen, Tampere and Lempäälä. Hallamaa, now a lance corporal (korpraali), was transferred to the navy after the war, where he worked as a signaller. Later that year he was promoted to corporal (alikersantti) and assigned to Gogland where he was tasked with gathering information on naval traffic in the Gulf of Finland and Red Navy movements in particular. He was listening to Soviet radio traffic along with Ragnvald Lind (later Ragnvalt Lautakari) who would continue to work in the radio intelligence under Hallamaa's lead. Hallamaa even managed to decipher some of the codes sent out by the Soviets. This awoke the interest in the higher military circles and Hallamaa was invited to come and hold a presentation on the work done at Gogland. Soon after, Hallamaa was promoted to the real of sergeant. He was now tasked with training radio operators and sent on trips to Kotka and Turku to try to repair radio stations that had been left there by the Russians.

He was promoted to First Sergeant ("vääpeli") after graduation from the NCO course in 1921 and was sent to the Radio Battalion in Santahamina and served as assistant chief for the Radio School. He held several lectures on codes and ciphers for higher officers in the 1920s. He was commissioned as a lieutenant in 1925 and was sent to the Finnish National Defence University in 1927.

After graduation, he was tasked with creating a Finnish radio intelligence organization. He received a stipend and began a series of travels to countries in Europe to study their SIGINT organizations. He travelled to Germany, Austria, Switzerland, Italy, Czechoslovakia and Poland. He learned code and cipher theories from an Austrian Professor named Fiegl, and he also set up an intensive cooperation network with the Polish intelligence. He learned about radio direction finding vehicles in Italy and managed to get some to Finland.

Beginning from 1927, the newly created Finnish Radio Intelligence followed the movements and the radio traffic of the Soviet Red Fleet. The first Soviet Red Fleet codes were broken in 1934 and soon more followed, including foreign diplomatic codes. Hallamaa was appointed captain in 1929 and major in 1939.

Hallamaa published "Basic Enciphering" (Salakirjoitustaidon perusteet) in 1937 and this publication was used as a training manual within the Finnish Army. It was the first Finnish-language book on the subject.

== World War II ==
At the beginning of the Winter War, Reino Hallamaa worked as the chief of the intelligence unit. On November 29, 1939, the unit intercepted and deciphered a message, which ordered the Soviet attack on Finland. Later on in the war, the intelligence managed to gather information on Soviet troop movements near Suomussalmi and warned Colonel Hjalmar Siilasvuo, who managed to defeat the Soviet 44th Division at the Raate road. The radio intelligence also relayed information on encircled Soviet units, helping the Finnish commanders in their decisions where and when to attack. By giving Soviet codes to the Swedish radio intelligence, the Finns received much-needed equipment for radio intelligence. Similar deals were also struck with other nations.

Hallamaa was appointed lieutenant colonel in 1941 and became commander of the HQ Radio Battalion. The Finnish radio intelligence managed to decipher 80% of Soviet radio traffic during the attack phase of the Continuation War. The advancing Finns also managed to come across some Russian code books. When the Soviets switched to another code, that had previously been used in the Far East, the Finns broke the code quite quickly, as they had received heaps of encoded Soviet radio messages from the Japanese. Hallamaa was awarded with the German Iron Cross first class after the Finnish radio intelligence had intercepted and deciphered a message resulting in the precise travel plan of the British convoy PQ 18. Attacks by the German Luftwaffe exacted a heavy toll on the supply convoy.

The Finns also worked on other countries codes and ciphers, cracking for instance the US STRIP code, as well as Brazilian, Portuguese, Romanian, Serbian, Vatican, and Vichy French codes.

Hallamaa was promoted colonel in 1944 and, at this point heading an organization that had grown from 75 to 1,000 during the war. The Air Force, which had its own radio intelligence organization had another 300 men decrypting Soviet Air Force radio traffic.

== Stella Polaris ==
As a preparation for a Soviet attack in mid-1944, Hallamaa, along with Aladar Paasonen, who was Chief of Intelligence, began drawing up plans for Operation Stella Polaris - the secret transfer of material and men to Sweden in case of a Soviet take-over of the country. The operation was funded by selling of the work (codes, ciphers, decoded material, etc.) to the intelligence organizations of at least the United States, Japan and Sweden. The U.S. Office of Strategic Services bought material in secrecy, informing only the U.S. President, but not the U.S. State Department.

They also planned to set up a secret radio movement in the case of a Soviet invasion. These would use both domestically designed light-weight radios, as well as captured radios. The Swedish contact person for the Stella Polaris operation was the Chief of the Swedish intelligence Carl Petersén.

The operation was initiated in September 1944 on orders from Hallamaa. About 350 wooden boxes were transferred by ship to Sweden, along with some 700–800 men who had worked with the radio intelligence, and their families. As the Soviet invasion failed to materialize, the majority of the Finns returned home, but only after destroying all intelligence records that had not been sold.

After the war, Hallamaa decided to leave Finland. On 8 February 1945, he travelled via Sweden to France, where he worked in the French intelligence. He decided to move to Spain when the Soviets began putting pressure on France to hand him over. He settled with his family in Costa del Sol in 1947 and began using the name Ricardo Palma. He started up a construction company with his son and retired at the age of 70. He died at the age of 80 in 1979 in Churriana, where he also is buried. In 2013, his ashes were brought back to Finland.

== Literature ==
- Karhunen Joppe: Reino Hallamaan salasanomasotaa
- Manninen, Ohto & Liene, Timo: Stella Polaris, suomalaista sotilastiedustelua, Helsinki, 2002, ISBN 951-37-3645-8
- Pale, Erkki: Suomen radiotiedustelu vuosina 1927-1944
- Rislakki, Jukka: Erittäin salainen - vakoilu Suomessa. Love-kirjat 1982
- Hallamaa, R. H.: Salakirjoitustaidon perusteet, own publication 1937.

== Sources ==
- Radiotiedustelun synty Suomessa
- Robert Brantberg: Eversti Reino Hallamaa
