= Pekka Toveri =

Finnish politician and major general

Pekka Toveri MEP
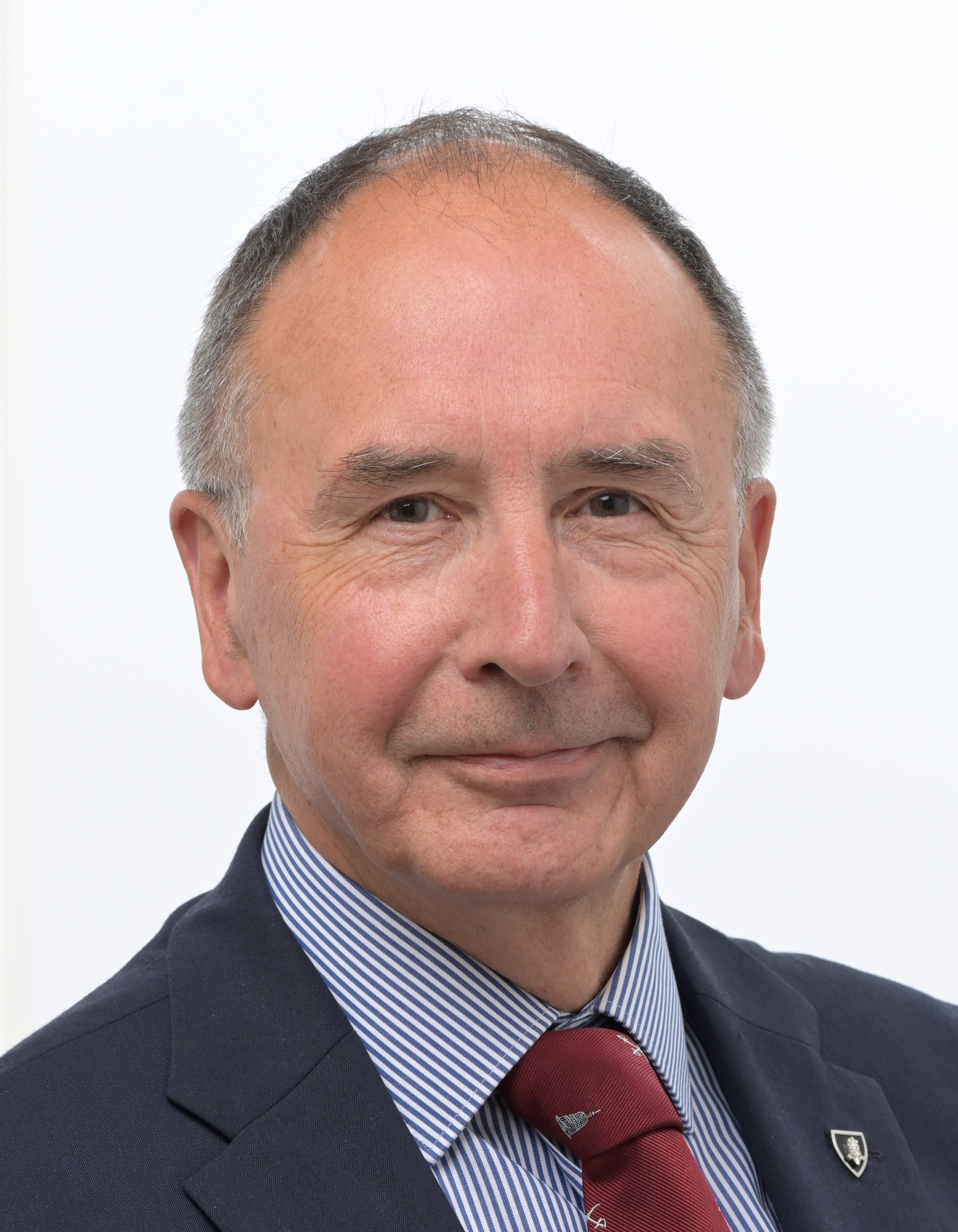
- Toveri in 2024

Member of the European Parliament
- Incumbent
- Assumed office 16 July 2024
- Constituency: Finland

Member of the Finnish Parliament
- In office 5 April 2023 – 16 July 2024
- Parliamentary group: National Coalition Party
- Constituency: Uusimaa
- Military career
- Born: 6 April 1961 (age 65); Kankaanpää, Finland
- Allegiance: Finland
- Branch: Finnish Army
- Rank: Major General
- Commands: Armoured Brigade (2011–2013); Western Finland military district (2014); Guard Jaeger Regiment (2015–2016); Intelligence Division of the Defence Command (2019–2020)

Pekka Juhani Toveri (born 6 April 1961) is a Finnish politician and retired general.

Toveri served in the Finnish Army for over 35 years, among other posts as the commander of the Armoured Brigade (2011–2013), the Western Finland military district (2014), and the Guard Jaeger Regiment (2015–2016); as military attaché at the Finnish Embassy in Washington, DC (2016–2019); and finally as the director of the Intelligence Division of the Defence Command (2019–2020), from which post he retired from active service at the rank of major general.

Toveri was commissioned as sub-lieutenant in 1982. He reached the rank of captain in 1990, major in 1995, colonel in 2007, brigadier general in 2013, and finally major general in 2019.

After leaving the military, he worked as a researcher affiliated to the Finnish Institute of International Affairs.

Toveri has become known as an expert commentator on the Russo-Ukrainian war.

Toveri was elected to the Parliament in the 2023 election, representing the Uusimaa electoral district for the National Coalition Party.

In July 2024, Toveri was elected to the 10th European Parliament, representing Finland for the National Coalition Party, as part of the EPP group.

Toveri is married to retired lieutenant colonel Siobhán Toveri of the US Air Force Reserve Command, who is attached to the US Embassy in Helsinki.
