= El Bujeo =

- Village
- Location in the Province of Cádiz El Bujeo (Spain)
- Coordinates: 36°04′15″N 5°31′15″W
- Country: Spain
- Autonomous community: Andalusia
- Province: Cádiz
- Comarca: Campo de Gibraltar
- Municipality: Tarifa
- Judicial district: Algeciras

Population (2009)
  - Total: 212
- Time zone: UTC+1 (CET)
  - Summer (DST): UTC+2 (CEST)
- Official language(s): Spanish

El Bujeo is a village in the municipality of Tarifa in the Province of Cadiz in southeastern Spain, It is located about 9 miles (14 km) southwest of Algeciras, along the main road to the southern tip of Spain at Tarifa, which is 11 kilometres (6.8 mi) away, and it lies between the villages of El Pelayo and El Cuartón. According to the National Statistics Institute, El Bujeo had 212 inhabitants in 2010. It lies within the Parque Natural del Estrecho, and woodland in the vicinity is said to offer a " diverse assemblage of breeding passerines."

== See also ==
- Bujeo
