= House of Bonde =

Swedish noble family

The arms of House Bonde

The House of Bonde is along with the houses of Bielke and Natt och Dag, one of the oldest surviving Swedish noble families. The earliest attested nobleman who is known to have carried the name Bonde was Torer Bonde, who served as witness during the confirmation of a donation to the abbey at Vreta in either 1282 or 1286.

== History ==
The most conclusively proven ancestors of the house were the brothers Tord Bonde (Petersson) and Erengisle Petersson (Bonde), who lived in the early 14th century. Tord is attested to have been made a squire in 1310, then a knight in 1316 after which he joined the rebellion to oust King Birger Magnusson from the throne. Tord was among the delegates sent to sue for peace with Birger once he fled to the court of his brother-in-law King Eric VI of Denmark. He was also present at the council of lords who sentenced the former king's son Magnus Birgersson (not to be confused with the Swedish king Magnus Birgersson) to death.

His brother Erengisle had a far less eventful life, the only thing that is known is that he was made squire in the year 1319 and remained as such until his death in 1350, and that the inheritance from him and his wife were split equally between his four children; the brothers Ragvald, Peter and Filip and their sister Ingeborg.

== Surviving branches ==
The arms of comital branch, Bonde af Björnö

Today, two branches of the family survive, both stem from the descendants of Erengisle. The barons of the House of Bonde which is number 20 in the Swedish House of Nobility and the counts of the House of Bonde af Björnö, number 41.

== Prominent members ==
Prominent members, bearing the name, include:

- Charles VIII of Sweden (Karl Knutsson Bonde); 1408/1409–1470), King, Charles I of Norway
- Carl Bonde (1872–1957), Swedish Army officer, equerry
  - Carl C:son Bonde (1897–1990), Swedish Army officer
  - Thord Bonde (1900–1969), Swedish Army officer
- Claës Bonde (1878–1965), Swedish diplomat and courtier
- Gustaf Bonde (1620–1667), Swedish statesman
- Gustaf Bonde (1911–1977), Swedish diplomat
- Magdalena of Sweden (1445–1495), Princess
- Tord Bonde (c. 1350–1417), medieval Swedish magnate
- Wilhelmina Bonde (1817–1899), Swedish courtier

== See also ==
- Bonde, one of the four estates of the Swedish Riksdag of the Estates
