= Finnish Defence Intelligence Agency =

Combined intelligence agency of the Finnish military

Finnish Defence Intelligence Agency FDIA
- Puolustusvoimien tiedustelulaitos Försvarsmaktens underrättelsetjänst
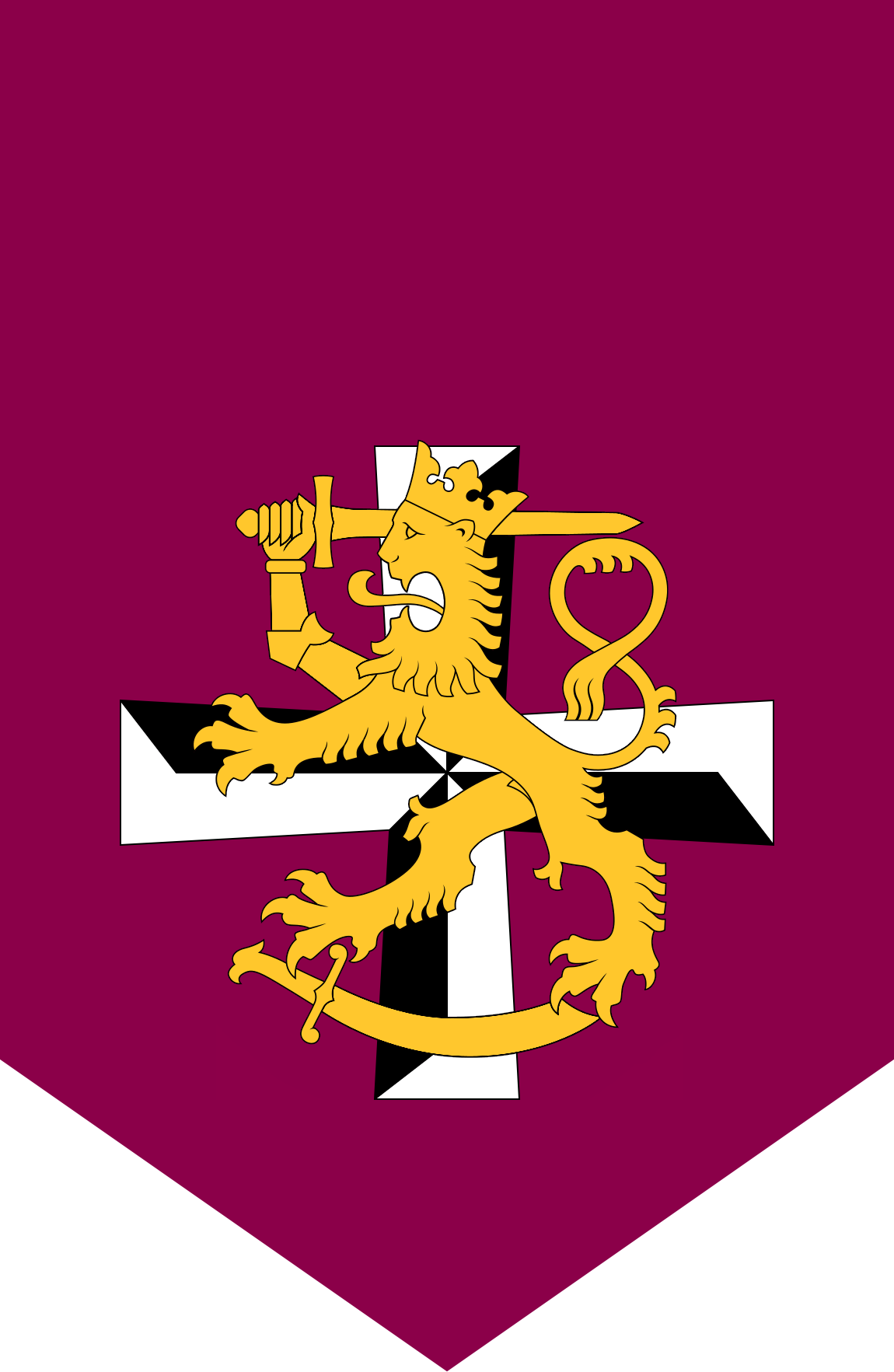
- Colours of Defence Command

Agency overview
- Formed: 1 May 2014; 12 years ago
- Preceding agencies: Finnish Intelligence Research Establishment; Finnish Military Intelligence Centre
- Jurisdiction: Republic of Finland
- Employees: 150–200 (2014)
- Annual budget: €15 million (2014)
- Minister responsible: Antti Häkkänen, Minister of Defence
- Agency executive: Colonel Esapekka Vehkaoja
- Parent department: Intelligence Division of Defence Command
- Website: puolustusvoimat.fi

The Finnish Defence Intelligence Agency, or FDIA for short, (Finnish: Puolustusvoimien tiedustelulaitos, PVTIEDL; Swedish: Försvarsmaktens underrättelsetjänst) is the combined signals (SIGINT), geospatial (GEOINT) and imagery intelligence (IMINT) agency of the Finnish Defence Forces. Operational since 2014, its responsibility is to support the defence of Finland through information gathering and analysis as an intelligence agency, organic to the Intelligence Division of Defence Command.

PVTIEDL's SIGINT history can be traced back to the establishment of Finnish radio intelligence in 1927 by Reino Hallamaa, a Defence Command intelligence officer, while its GEOINT history starts from 1812 with the establishment of the Haapaniemi military surveying school and topographical service. The successes of its predecessors are considered instrumental in key battles of the Winter and Continuation War during 1939–1944, such as intelligence at the largest battle in the history of Nordic countries, the Battle of Tali-Ihantala.

== Organization ==
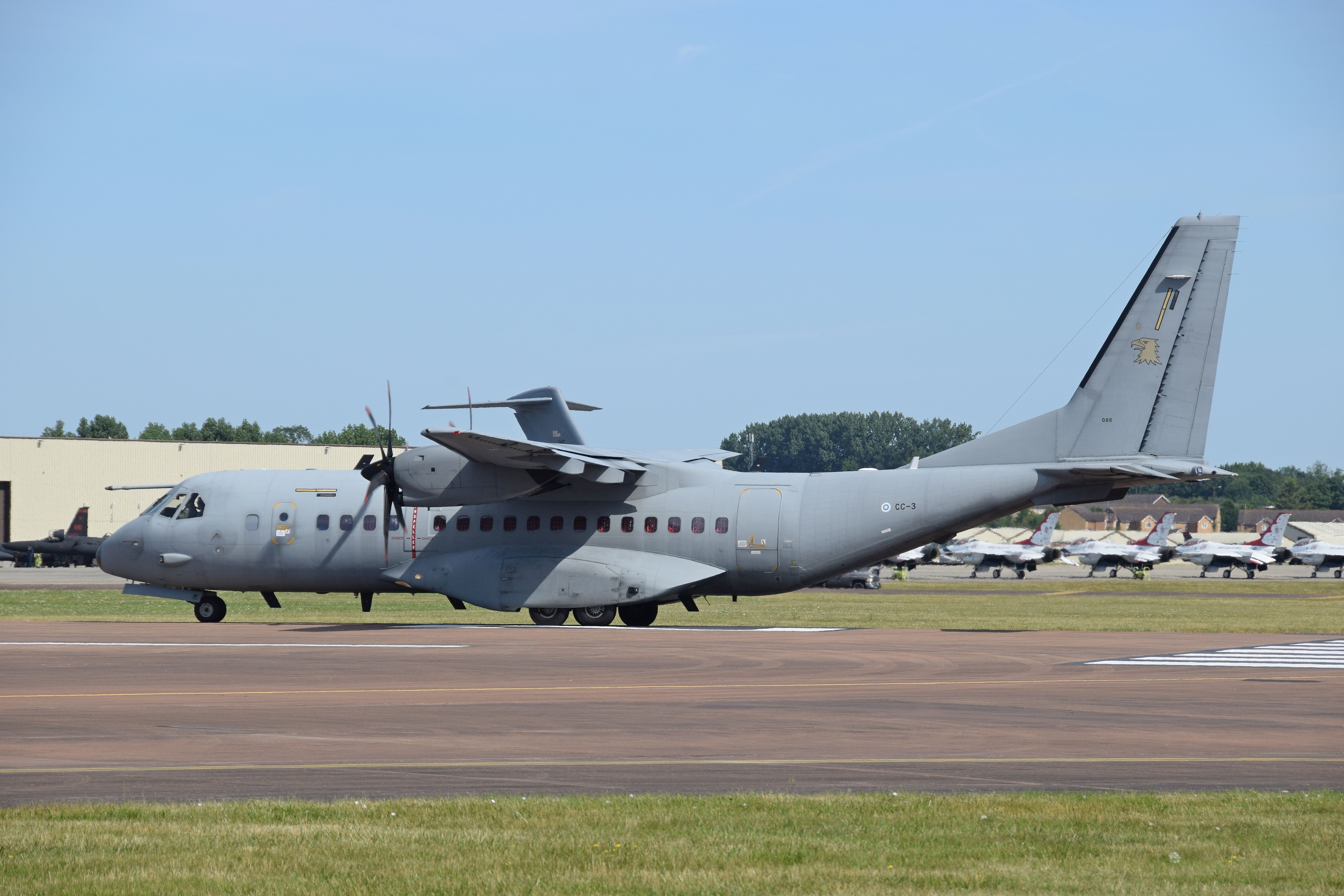
CASA C-295 operated by the Finnish Defence Intelligence Agency

=== Function ===
The Finnish Defence Intelligence Agency is subordinate to the Intelligence Division of Defence Command and its self-stated tasks include analysing military strategies, gathering geospatial and meteorological intelligence, training Defence Forces and partner staff, such as police or border guard, as well as supporting peacekeeping operations, such as Finnish deployments to the War in Afghanistan, with information services. News reports and other independent sources usually describe it as the main SIGINT, GEOINT and IMINT agency of the Finnish military.

It was formed on 1 May 2014 by merging the Finnish Military Intelligence Centre, the Finnish Intelligence Research Establishment and counter-intelligence assets from the Intelligence Division. According to a 2014 interview with Chief of Intelligence, then Brigadier General Harri Ohra-aho, the merger enabled a more comprehensive intelligence overview and enhanced analytical cooperation. The Agency's main elements are situated in Helsinki and Jyväskylä with separate elements around Finland. According to a news report, it employed 150–200 persons and its budget was 15 million euros in 2014.

The preceding SIGINT and IMINT arm of the military, the Finnish Intelligence Research Establishment (Finnish: Viestikoelaitos, Swedish: Signalprovanstalten) operated principally as a part of Finnish Air Force Headquarters at Tikkakoski, near Jyväskylä. The facility received its orders from Defence Command and employed 120–140 personnel according to a 2007 news report. It was renamed the Finnish Intelligence Research Centre (Finnish: Viestikoekeskus, Swedish: Signalsprovancentret) when it became a subunit of the Agency.

According to a 2017 exposé by the Finnish newspaper Helsingin Sanomat, the Finnish Intelligence Research Centre is responsible for monitoring the Russian Armed Forces by capturing and analysing electromagnetic radiation and maintaining an electronic intelligence mapping that contains information on the Russian military, such as unit types, command and control structures, air defences, readiness plans and missions. During peacetime, the Centre monitors at least the Leningrad Military District while only a fraction of its monitoring is focused on the Western world. The Centre reports its findings first to the Intelligence Division and finally to the President, Prime Minister, Defence Minister and high command of the Defence Forces. The newspaper released examples of the Intelligence Research Centre's analysis topics, such as Russian synthetic-aperture radars from 2005, security-related effects of the Nord Stream 1 pipeline, electronic countermeasures against Buk missiles, and Russian military action during the Russo-Georgian War of 2008.

Before the merger, the strategic analysis-focused Finnish Military Intelligence Centre (Finnish: Puolustusvoimien tiedustelukeskus, Swedish: Militära underrättelsecentret) had been located in Helsinki since 2007 and contained a topographical unit specialized in GEOINT as well as an intelligence school. Most information on the Agency or its predecessors is not public per Finnish law. Regarding the Intelligence Research Establishment, virtually every document concerning closer details, such as leadership structure or intelligence processes, were confirmed as secret by a Supreme Administrative Court ruling in 2007—except for budget and employee count.

=== Equipment ===
In addition to land-based intercept and listening stations, the facility gathers airborne IMINT and SIGINT. For example, the Intelligence Research Establishment started using a Fokker F27 Friendship airplane in 1991 and procured an EADS CASA C-295 tactical transport aircraft in 2012 to be fitted with a Lockheed Martin intermodal container-based Dragon Shield electronic signals intelligence suite; the CASA entered service in 2016. During procurement, the CASA was required to be able to monitor signals from 1,5 MHz to 40 GHz, listen to a minimum of a hundred different channels, and be NATO compatible to fulfil its intended mission. The full cost of the airborne electronic signals intelligence programme was around 250–270 million euros according to Helsingin Sanomat.

== History ==
=== Signals intelligence ===
==== 1927–1939 ====
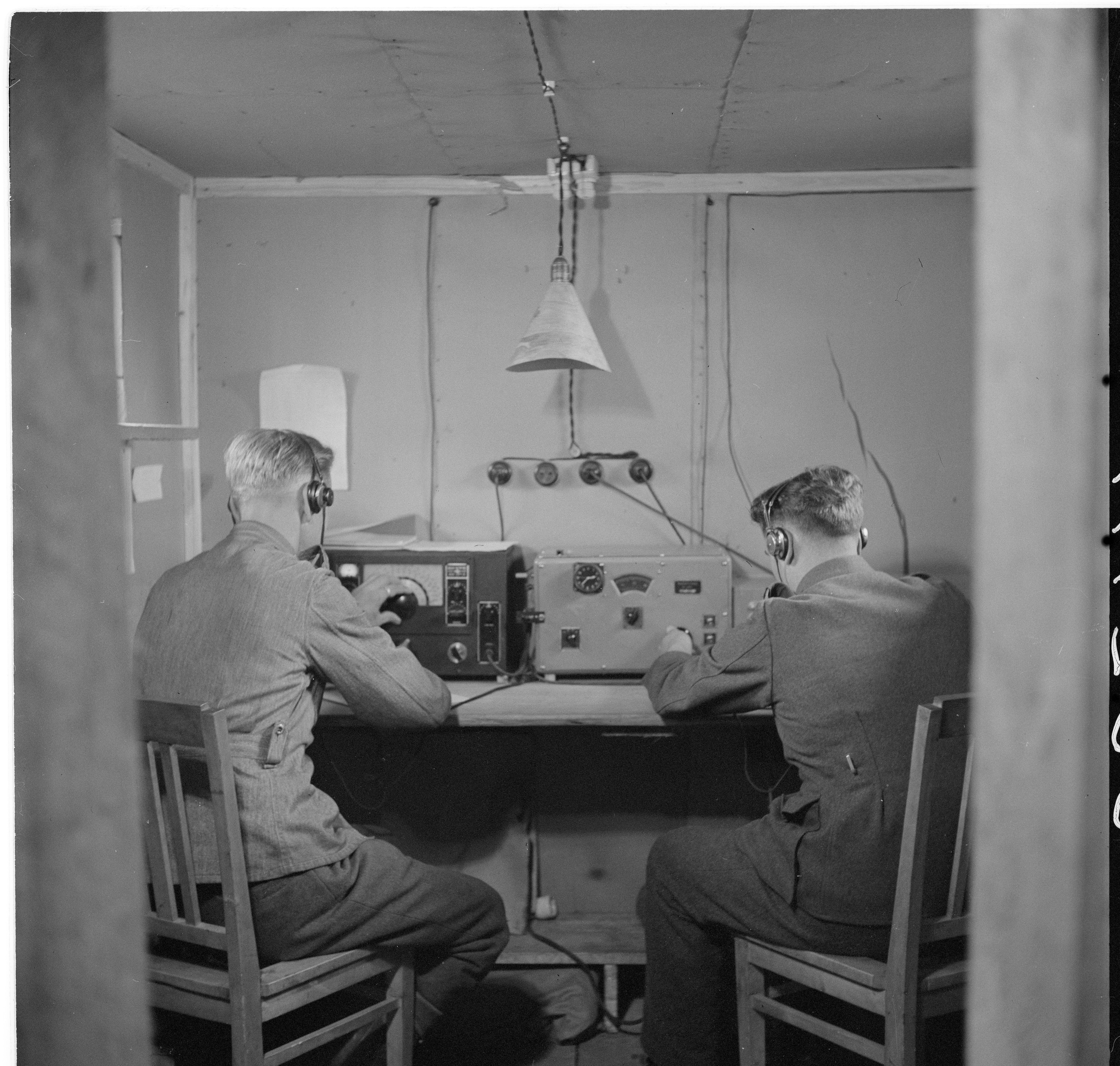
A dugout listening station in Vazhiny along the Svir River during the Continuation War in 1942

Finland's history in signals intelligence (SIGINT) can be traced back to 1927 and the birth of Finnish radio intelligence. On 14 June 1927, Lieutenant Reino Hallamaa was transferred to the Statistics Office (Finnish: Tilastotoimisto) of Defence Command, a cover for the military intelligence unit, and ordered to create a radio intelligence capacity for the Finnish Defence Forces. To kickstart the process, Hallamaa studied radio intelligence theory and methods around Europe, recruited mathematicians and Russian translators, procured signal detectors and radio receivers, built listening stations and started exchanging decrypted messages with counterparts, such as Polish intelligence. For example, he visited Germany, Austria, Switzerland, Italy, Czechoslovakia and Poland to examine SIGINT and cryptanalysis capabilities and equipment.

By 1929, the Statistics Office was able to decrypt diplomatic cables, such as United States messaging between Washington, D.C., and its embassy in Helsinki, to the benefit of state leadership. By 1934, the Office could intercept and decrypt Soviet Navy messages after monitoring and comparing its communications and movement extensively with a Hansa-Brandenburg W.33 reconnaissance plane above the Gulf of Finland and from neighbouring islands. It also was able to ascertain most of the Soviet Union's Winter War invasion plans in advance through radio listening. On the eve of the Winter War, 29 November 1939, the Office intercepted Soviet messages to armored brigades to commence the invasion as well as the fakel (Russian for torch) invasion codes sent to the Soviet Baltic Fleet.

==== 1939–1944 ====
As the Winter War began in 1939, Hallamaa and the SIGINT assets under his command were reorganized as the Signals Intelligence Office (Finnish: Viestitiedustelutoimisto). The Signals Intelligence Office was able to intercept Soviet messages and inform Colonel Hjalmar Siilasvuo of Red Army movements during the Battle of Suomussalmi. With the intelligence, Colonel Siilasvuo had the initiative and could pocket and destroy the Soviet 44th Rifle Division at the Battle of Raate Road. The division had been en route to support the encircled 163rd Rifle Division. the Finns intercepted messages guiding the encircled Soviet troops how to light up signal fires for air supply pilots to recognize during night-time. The Finns lit similar fires and some of the Soviet supplies were received by the Finns. Military hardware in dire need, such as 43 tanks and 71 field guns, was captured. The victory by the Finnish Army against superior forces is cited as one of the most significant battles of the Winter War.

During the Interim Peace in 1940, Hallamaa traded broken Soviet ciphers with other states to fund Finnish signals intelligence operations—for example to the Swedes in exchange for RCA transmitters. Hallamaa was promoted to lieutenant colonel and appointed the commander of Defence Command's Radio Battalion (Finnish: Radiopataljoona) in October 1941 during the early months of the Continuation War. Finnish radio intelligence had grown from 75 persons during the Winter War to approximately 1,000 soldiers. Reportedly, they were able to decrypt 80 percent of Soviet messages on the Finnish front. Collaboration and exchange of Soviet ciphers with Japan bore fruit when the Soviets switched their western front ciphers in late 1941 with the eastern ciphers used in Vladivostok—immediately decryptable due to the exchange. In 1942, Finnish intelligence cracked telegrams of the Allied convoys PQ 17 and PQ 18 heading to Arkhangelsk, Soviet Union and supplied the information to Abwehr, German military intelligence. Germans subsequently attacked both convoys.

Finnish intelligence also made mistakes by revealing too much of its knowledge, such as in 1941 when eager personnel messaged the Red Fleet with its own ciphers to surrender. The Fleet immediately switched their ciphers and frequencies. Too much radio intelligence-based information of the Kaleva airplane, shot down by Soviets bombers during peacetime, was published—most likely allowing Soviets to learn of compromised ciphers.

During the battle of Tali-Ihantala in the summer of 1944, considered the largest battle in Nordic military history, Finnish radio intelligence intercepted Soviet messaging of divisions assembling to launch attacks. Due to the captured information, Finnish artillery as well as Finnish and German aircraft, notably the German Detachment Kuhlmey, were able to forestall the attacks of Soviet units waiting in assembly zones. Subsequently, the 50,000 Finnish defenders was able to halt the 150,000 men in the Soviet attack and the Vyborg-Petrozavodsk Offensive, the last big operation of the Continuation War.

The Finnish Air Force started its independent signals intelligence operations by establishing a radio intelligence company on 10 October 1942, later reorganized into a 500-person radio intelligence battalion in March 1944 and disbanded after the Continuation War. Hallamaa and his intelligence unit focused on land and sea-based messaging, the Air Force concentrated on air-based intelligence.

==== 1944–present ====
In the autumn of 1944, after the Moscow Armistice, 700 to 800 Finnish SIGINT staff fled to Sweden with 350 crates of cryptography equipment in operation Stella Polaris, led by colonels Aladár Paasonen and Reino Hallamaa. The goal of the operation was to escape Soviet retribution and bring secret material to safety as well as to try and create a contingency SIGINT service if it would be required later on against a possible Soviet Union occupation of Finland. Likewise, material concerning SIGINT of the Finnish military was destroyed or hidden in Sweden. C-byrån of the Swedish military and the National Defence Radio Establishment coordinated the operation at their end and received, for example, cracked ciphers from the Finns. Some war-time documents hidden in the operation were later reportedly found in microfilms, for example, at the CIA's central archives and NSA's National Cryptologic Museum—while some have not resurfaced. A significant amount of the documents brought to Sweden had been microfilmed in a hotel basement in Stockholm in late 1944 and early 1945. Most of the SIGINT staff were returned to Finland by Sweden after temporary internment, and some 30 of them were interrogated by the State Police although no indictments were issued. Colonels Paasonen and Hallamaa did not return to Finland for the rest of their lives.

The Finnish Intelligence Research Establishment was founded on 24 October 1955 within the Finnish Air Force, first as the Intelligence Research Station (Finnish: Viestikoeasema) in central Helsinki. The Establishment expanded throughout the 1960s by building intercept stations and by appointing personnel to statistical units of the Air Force and the Navy. In December 1973, its headquarters relocated to the Tikkakoski garrison near Jyväskylä. In 2014, the Intelligence Research Establishment was merged into the Finnish Defence Intelligence Agency and it was redesignated the Intelligence Research Centre.

In December 2017, the newspaper Helsingin Sanomat wrote an exposé about the Intelligence Research Centre based on leaked classified Defence Forces' documents. President of Finland Sauli Niinistö issued a statement where he deemed the leak illegal and critical to national security, and a criminal investigation was initiated. The prosecutor decided to press charges against the two journalists who had written the story, and their immediate superior. In 2023, the Helsinki District Court convicted the journalists Tuomo Pietiläinen and Laura Halminen of the crime of revealing security-related secrets. Pietiläinen was sentences to 50 day-fines, while Halminen was left without punishment. Their superior was considered not guilty. Both the journalists and the prosecutor appealed. In 2025, the Helsinki Court of Appeals convicted the main writer, Pietiläinen to four months in prison, suspended, and Halminen to 80 day-fines. Pietiläinen was also sentenced to lose his military rank. The Court of Appeals condemned the actions of the pair strongly, noting that their article - and a series of articles already written but left unpublished in the wake of the tumult following the first article - had not been serving public interest but merely revealing defence secrets for the sake of getting respect from some colleagues. "Democratic society, free media as a part of it, cannot be maintained, if freedom of speech is used so that it needlessly erodes the external security of the state vis-á-vis eventually hostile parties", wrote the Court.

=== Geospatial intelligence ===
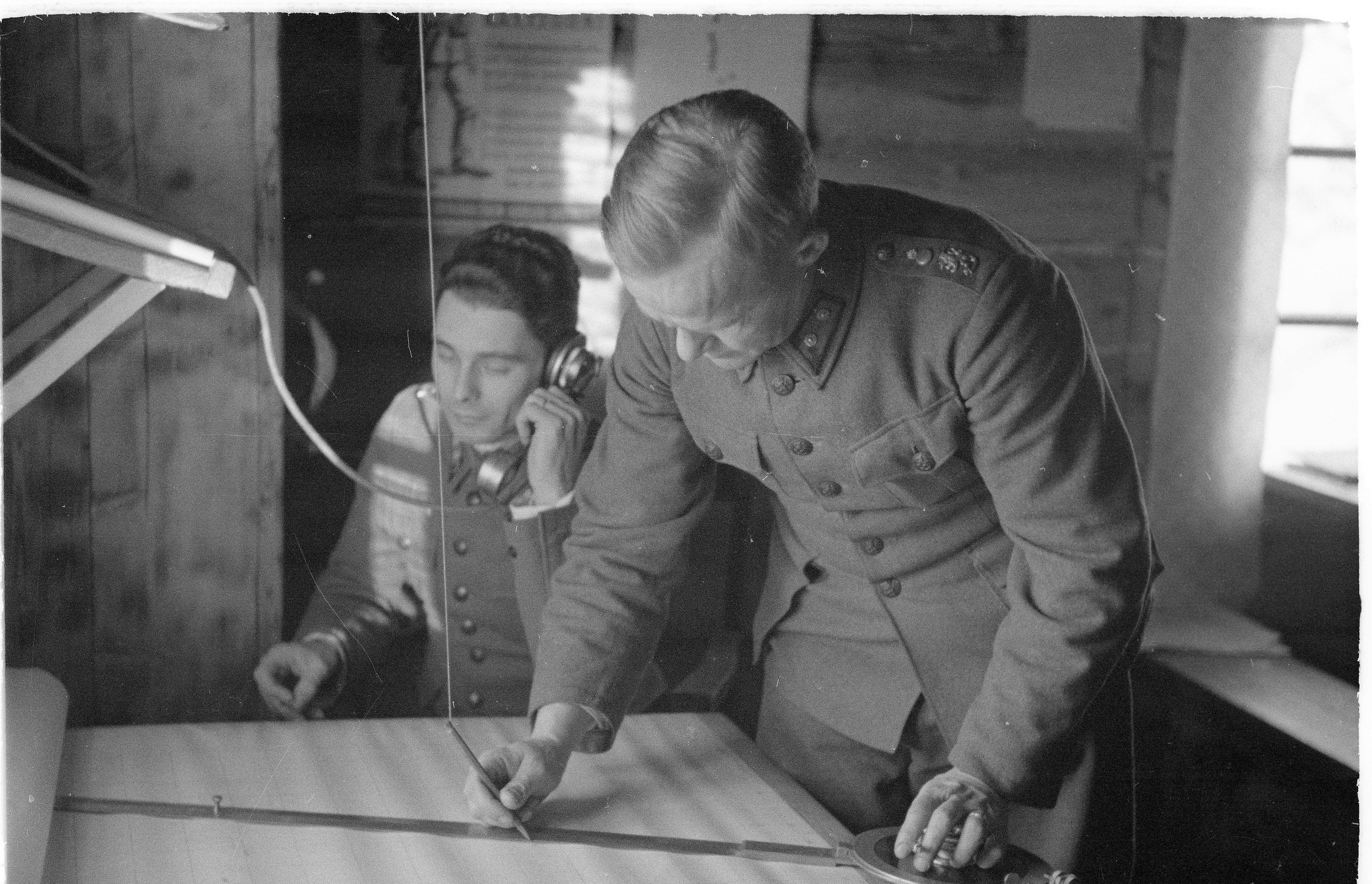
In 1944 at Rukajärvi, light and sound surveying data of Soviet artillery locations received by phone during a battle is converted onto a map and immediately relayed to friendly batteries

Finnish geospatial intelligence (GEOINT) is considered to have started with the Haapaniemi military surveying school and topographical service established in 1812 in Rantasalmi, Grand Duchy of Finland (modern Finland). During the 1918 Finnish Civil War, Major Claës Stenius organized and led the War Topography Division of White Finland's military and continued in the same role at Defence Command after Finnish independence. The first months of the Division were hectic in assembling all the maps it could find and organizing map printing services. The unit was reorganized more than twenty times until the turn of the century with different names, such as Topography Office, Topography Section and Topography Division. Similarly, General Vilho Petter Nenonen created a parallel Surveying Battery (Finnish: Mittauspatteri) in 1924 to support the imagery, meteorological and topographical intelligence of Finnish artillery with officers being educated at the University of Helsinki on surveying theory. The responsibilities of the Topography Section (Finnish: Topografikunta) of Defence Command and the Surveying Battery overlapped during the 1920s and 1930s and the units disagreed on whether to centralize or decentralize GEOINT assets.

Two separate surveying batteries and a topography company were mobilized in 1939 during the Winter War and four surveying batteries and a topography battalion during the Continuation War. They supported frontline operations of the Finnish Defence Forces mostly at the Karelian Isthmus while the topographical unit of Defence Command continued its headquarters-level GEOINT duties, first as a section and later as a division. During the 2-week battle of Tali-Ihantala in June 1944, the topographical and surveying capability of the Finnish artillery, especially the trajectory corrector developed by Nenonen, allowed accurate, simultaneous and concentrated fire of 21 artillery batteries, approximately 240 guns, to support counter-attacks and render assembling Soviet spearheads ineffective with an approximate total of 110,000 to 120,000 rounds of ordnance. Roughly 70% of the approximately 22,000 Soviet casualties were caused by artillery and mortar fire. The barrage was considered a world record of artillery at the time and according to Nenye and others, halted and destroyed over thirty Soviet formations larger than a battalion.

After the wars and demobilization, the Surveying Battery was transferred from its original location in Hämeenlinna to Niinisalo in 1950 and bolstered in 1952 into an independent Surveying Artillery Battalion (Finnish: Mittauspatteristo) directly under Defence Command. Likewise in 1952, the Topography Division (Finnish: Topografiosasto) was organized back into its former name, the Topography Section, as an independent unit. This status quo remained until the Surveying Artillery Battalion was transferred in 1979 within the Niinisalo Artillery School and later renamed as the Intelligence Artillery Battalion (Finnish: Tiedustelupatteristo). In 2007, the Topography Section was merged into the Finnish Military Intelligence Centre and in 2014, to the Finnish Defence Intelligence Agency.

== See also ==
- Cold War II
- European Centre of Excellence for Countering Hybrid Threats
- Finnish Security Intelligence Service
- Military history of Finland during World War II
- Remote sensing
- Utti Jaeger Regiment

== Notes and references ==
=== Notes ===
- As some of the early units mentioned do not have official English translations, Wikipedia editors have taken the liberty to translate them.
- Due to intelligence documentation being destroyed or hidden and intelligence officers fleeing to Sweden during Operation Stella Polaris, material and research into Finnish military intelligence is scarce at points.
