= Carl Carlsson Bonde =

Swedish army officer

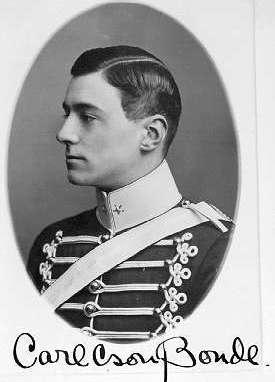
- Carl Carlsson Bonde in 1922
- Born: Carl Carlsson Bonde af Björnö; 28 February 1897; Rytterne, Västerås Municipality, Sweden
- Died: 8 May 1990 (aged 93); Mörkö, Södertälje Municipality, Sweden
- Relatives: Carl Bonde (father); Thord Bonde (brother)
- Military career
- Allegiance: Sweden
- Branch: Swedish Army
- Service years: 1917–1938, 1943–1957 (Sweden); 1939–1942 (Finland)
- Rank: Colonel (Sweden); Lieutenant colonel (Finland)
- Unit: Swedish Volunteer Corps
- Commands: Domestic Department, Defence Staff
- Conflicts: Winter War; Operation Stella Polaris

Count Carl Carlsson Bonde af Björnö, also known as Carl C:son Bonde (28 February 1897 – 8 May 1990) was a Swedish Army officer. Commissioned in 1917, he rose through the ranks of the General Staff and was military attaché in London before joining the Finnish defense during World War II, first as a company commander in the Swedish Volunteer Corps during the Winter War and later as a battalion commander in the Finnish Army, where he attained the rank of lieutenant colonel. Returning to Sweden, he became head of the Defence Staff's Domestic Department in 1943, played a role in Operation Stella Polaris, and later served with the National Swedish Office for Aliens. Promoted to colonel in the reserve in 1945, he retired in 1957. Beyond the military, Bonde managed family estates and became a leading figure in international bridge, serving as chairman of the World Bridge Federation from 1968 to 1970.

== Early life ==
Carl, by birth member of the House of Bonde, was born on 28 February 1897 in Rytterne Parish, Västerås Municipality, Sweden, the son of Crown Equerry, Count Carl Bonde af Björnö and his wife Blanche Dickson. He was the brother of General Thord Bonde and a half-brother of financier and Cabinet Chamberlain Peder Bonde.

== Career ==
=== Military career ===
Bonde was commissioned as an officer in 1917 and was assigned to the Life Regiment Hussars (K 3) in 1917 as a second lieutenant. He graduated from Stockholm School of Economics in 1933. Bonde served as a captain in the General Staff in 1935 and he was military attaché in London from 1937 to 1938. He was a company commander in the Swedish Volunteer Corps during the Winter War in Finland from 1939 to 1940 and he was promoted to major in 1940. Bonde was a battalion commander in the Finnish Army from 1941 to 1942 and he became a Finnish lieutenant colonel in 1942.

When the German-friendly head of the Domestic Department in the Swedish Defence Staff, Major Thorwald Lindquist, was dismissed in October 1943, he was replaced with the Western-friendly Bonde who also was promoted to lieutenant colonel. Bonde was active in Operation Stella Polaris in 1944 before being relocated by the government to the National Swedish Office for Aliens (Statens utlänningskommission) where he was a member from 1944 to 1945. Bonde was promoted to colonel in the reserve in 1945 and retired from the army in 1957.

=== Other work ===
Bonde possessed the entailed estate of Vibyholm and leased the entailed estates of Hörningsholm and Tjolöholm until 1964. He was chairman of the students' union of Stockholm University College from 1932 to 1933 and the Stockholm University Student Union's federation board from 1933 to 1934.

Bonde was chairman of the Swedish Bridge Federation from 1960 and was vice chairman of the European Bridge League from 1950. He was chairman of the World Bridge Federation from 1968 to 1970.

== Personal life ==
Bonde was married between 1920–1945 to Martha Elvira Augusta Elisabeth Mörner (born 1900), the daughter of the chamberlain and ryttmästare Hjalmar Stellan Mörner and Marta Jenny Hilda Carolina Sylvan. He married for the second time in 1946, to Greta Swartling (1905–1961), the daughter of banking director John Swartling and Alice Borg. Bonde married a third time in 1962, to Countess Elisabeth Wachtmeister af Johannishus (1926–1972), the daughter of Hovjägmästare, Count Otto Wachtmeister and Brita Nordenstierna.

He was the father of Gustaf C:son Bonde (1921–1997); Catharina (1922–1968), who married the director of London School of Journalism, Geoffrey Butler (born 1898); and Cecilia (1926–2010), who married writer Henric Ståhl (1908–1991).

== Death ==
Bonde died on 8 May 1990 in Mörkö, Södertälje Municipality.

== Awards and decorations ==
=== Swedish ===
- (Sweden) Knight of the Order of the Sword (1938)
- (Sweden) Medal for Noble Deeds in gold

=== Foreign ===
- (Finland) 2nd Class of the Order of the Cross of Liberty
- (Finland) 3rd Class of the Order of the Cross of Liberty with oak leaf
- (Finland) 3rd Class of the Order of the Cross of Liberty with swords
- (Finland) 4th Class of the Order of the Cross of Liberty with swords
- (Norway) King Haakon VII Freedom Medal
- (Finland) 2 x Finnish War Memorial Medal with clasp and sword
- (United Kingdom) British commemorative medal

Military offices
Preceded by Thorwald Lindquist	Defence Staff's Domestic Department; 1943–1945	Succeeded by Hakon Leche
