= Påhlson =

Påhlson is a Swedish-language surname. Notable people with the surname include:

- Svante Påhlson (1882–1959), Swedish military personnel, businessman and art patron, best known for Operation Stella Polaris
