= Heikki Paasonen =

Heikki Paasonen may refer to:

- Heikki Paasonen (linguist) (1865–1919), Finnish linguist
- Heikki Paasonen (presenter) (born 1983), Finnish television presenter
