= Intelligence Division (Finland) =

Coordinates: 60.1641782°N 24.9496668°E

Intelligence Division of Defence Command
- Pääesikunnan tiedusteluosasto Huvudstabens underrättelseavdelning
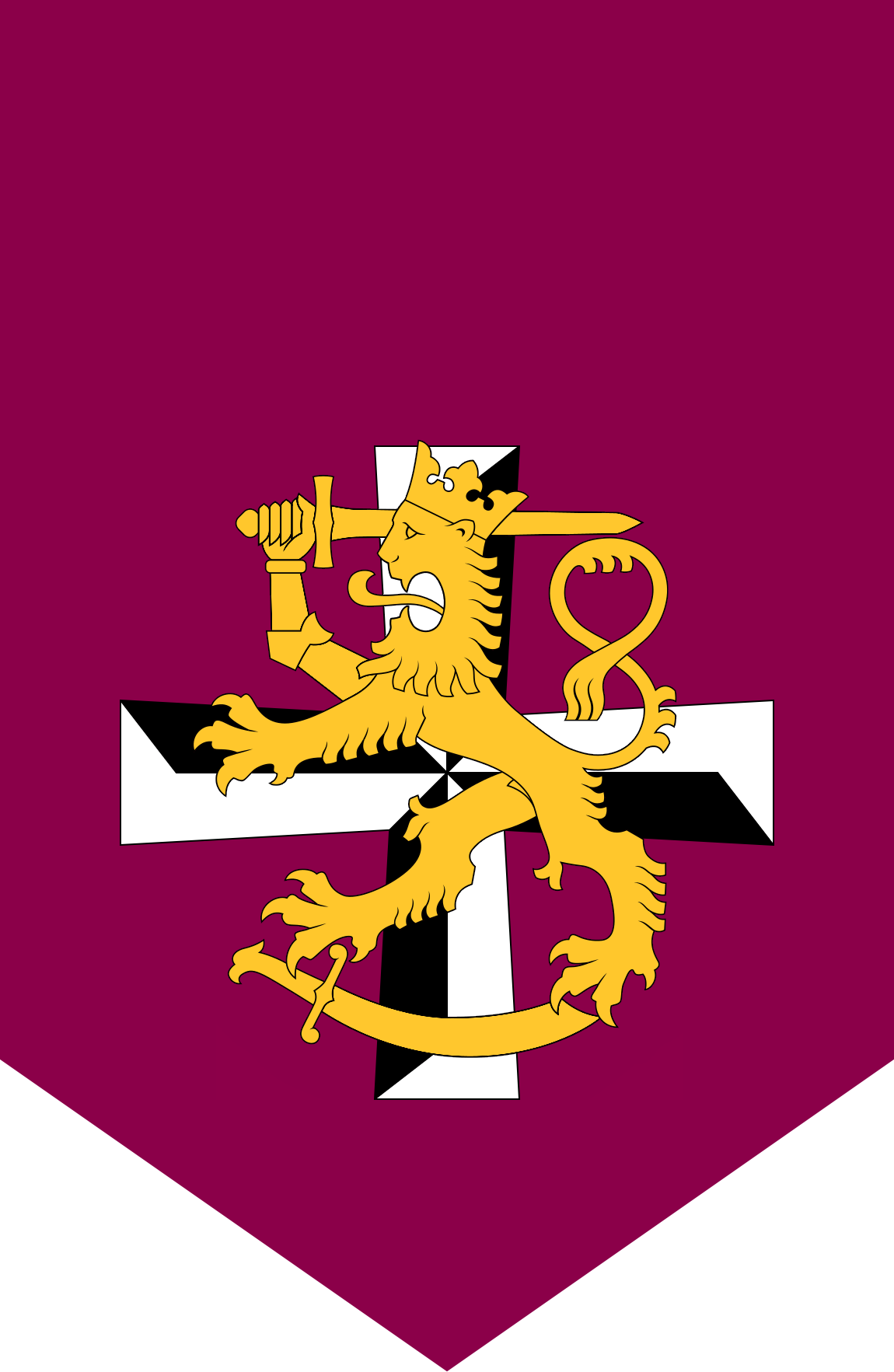
- Colours of Defence Command
- Active: Since 11 February 1918
- Country: Finland
- Role: Military intelligence
- Part of: Defence Command
- Garrison: Guard's Garrison, Fabianinkatu 2, Helsinki, Finland
- Engagements: Finnish Civil War; Winter War; Continuation War; Lapland War
- Website: puolustusvoimat.fi

Commanders
- Chief of Intelligence: Rear Adimiral Juha Vauhkonen
- Notable commanders: Major General Harri Ohra-aho

The Intelligence Division of Defence Command (Finnish: Pääesikunnan tiedusteluosasto, PE TIEDOS; Fenno-Swedish: Huvudstabens underrättelseavdelning) is the unit in charge of Finnish military intelligence. Operational since the creation of the Finnish Defence Forces, its responsibility as a military intelligence service is to support the defence of Finland through information gathering and analysis with the Finnish Defence Intelligence Agency under its command.

The division's predecessors have been organized within Defence Command of the Finnish Defence Forces under multiple names and configurations—partly to conceal covert operations. The first iteration, the Information Office, was created in 1918 at the start of the Finnish Civil War.

== Function ==
The Intelligence Division is self-statedly in charge of military intelligence in the Defence Forces and responsible for the use of intelligence capabilities. Its tasks include monitoring changes in the security environment, providing early warning of military and external threats, and counter-intelligence—similar to the tasks its predecessors have performed. In a 2014 interview, Chief of Intelligence, then Brigadier General Harri Ohra-aho stated that the military gathers information according to Finnish and host country legislation with signals (SIGINT), imagery (IMINT), geospatial (GEOINT) and open-source intelligence (OSINT) as well as through military attachés.

Most information regarding the division or its predecessors is not public per Finnish law.

== History ==
On 11 February 1918, in the early stages of the Finnish Civil War, commander-in-chief of White Finland's military, General Carl Gustaf Emil Mannerheim, appointed Lieutenant Isak Alfthan to command the Information Office (Finnish: Tietotoimisto) of Mannerheim's headquarters and start gathering military intelligence on the civil war enemy Red Finland as well as on Russian units.

During the Continuation War and Lapland War, Intelligence Division was in charge of directing the four long-range reconnaissance patrol detachments (Finnish: kaukopartio-osastot), intended to assault assets as well as disrupt supply and communications behind enemy lines. In July 1943, the detachments were reorganized as companies within Detached Battalion 4, commanded by the Intelligence Division. The units conducted around 350 long-range reconnaissance patrols during wartime. Utti Jaeger Regiment was established de facto in 1962 to mimic the special operations of Detached Battalion 4.

== See also ==
- Cold War II
- Finnish Security Intelligence Service
- Foreign relations of Finland
- Information warfare
- Little green men (Russo-Ukrainian War)
- Military history of Finland during World War II

== Notes and references ==
=== Notes ===
- As some of the early units mentioned do not have official English translations, Wikipedia editors have taken the liberty to translate them.
- Due to intelligence documentation being destroyed or hidden and intelligence officers fleeing to Sweden during Operation Stella Polaris, material and research into Finnish military intelligence is scarce at points.
