= Churriana =

Coordinates: 36.6652°N 4.4903°W

- District of Málaga
- Country: Spain
- Aut. community: Andalusia
- Municipality: Málaga

Area
  - Total: 37.32 km^{2} (14.41 sq mi)

Population
  - Total: 20,449
  - Density: 547.94/km^{2} (1,419.2/sq mi)
- Postal code: 28032
- Málaga district number: 8
- Address of council: Plaza de la Inmaculada 11, 29140

Churriana, also known as District 8, is one of the 11 districts of the city of Málaga, Spain. Churriana holds the Málaga Airport.

It comprises the following wards (barrios): Aeropuerto, Arraijanal, Buenavista, Butano, Campamento Benítez, Campo de Golf, Cañada de Ceuta, Cementerio Churriana, Churriana, Cortijo de Mazas, Cortijo San Isidro, Cortijo San Julián, Depuradora Guadalhorce, El Cuartón, El Higueral, El Olivar, El Retiro, Finca La Hacienda, Finca Monsálvez, Guadalmar, Hacienda Platero, Heliomar, La Azucarera, La Casita de Madera, La Cizaña, La Noria, La Tosca, Las Espeñuelas, Las Pedrizas, Los Chochales, Los Jazmines, Los Manantiales, Los Paredones, Los Paseros, Los Rosales, Lourdes, Makro, Parque del Guadalhorce, Polígono Comercial Guadalhorce, Polígono Industrial Aeropuerto, Polígono Industrial El Álamo, Polígono Industrial El Tarajal, Polígono Industrial Guadalhorce, Polígono Industrial Haza de la Cruz, Polígono Industrial KM.239 Ctra. N-340, Polígono Industrial Mi Málaga, Polígono Industrial Santa Bárbara, Polígono Industrial Santa Cruz, Polígono Industrial Santa Teresa, Polígono Industrial Villa Rosa, Rojas, San Fernando, San Jerónimo, San Juan-El Albaricocal, San Julián, Santa Tecla, Vega de Oro, Wittenberg.
