= Carl Bonde =

Swedish Army officer, equerry and horse rider

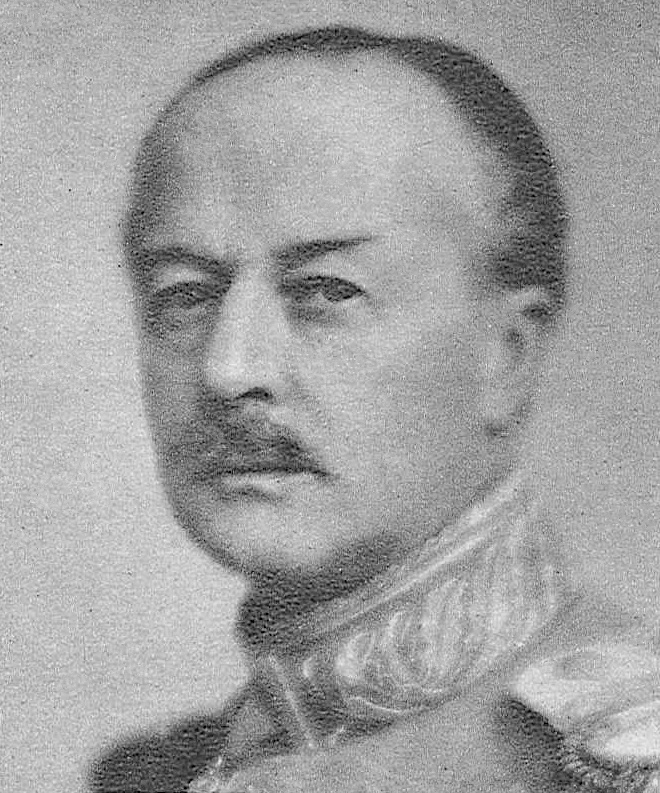
- Carl Bonde c. 1942

Personal information
- Born: 28 April 1872 Mörkö, Stockholm, Sweden
- Died: 13 June 1957 (aged 85) Hörningsholm Castle, Sweden

Sport
- Country: Sweden
- Sport: Horse riding
- Club: K3 IF, Skövde
Medal record
Representing Sweden
Olympics
Gold medal – first place	1912 Stockholm	Individual dressage
Silver medal – second place	1928 Amsterdam	team dressage

Count Carl Gustaf Bonde af Björnö (28 April 1872 – 13 June 1957) was a Swedish Army officer, equerry and horse rider who competed at the 1912 and 1928 Olympics.

== Military career ==
Bonde was born in Stockholm, Sweden and was the son of landowner, count Gustaf Fredrik Bonde af Björnö and his English wife Ida Horatia Charlotta Marryat. After passing his studentexamen in 1892, Bonde became a sergeant in the Life Regiment Hussars (K 3) in 1893, second lieutenant in 1894 and lieutenant there in 1900. He retired in 1908 and became cavalry captain in the reserve in 1910. The year before, in 1909, Bonde was appointed Equerry of the court and advanced in 1916 to Crown Equerry, a position he held for decades.

== Sports career ==
Bonde was a prominent horse rider. In 1912, he won the gold medal in the individual dressage competition with his horse Emperor. Sixteen years later, he won the silver medal as a member of the Swedish team. He also competed in the 1928 Olympic individual dressage competition with his horse Ingo and finished 19th.

== Other work ==
Bonde possessed a wide range of entailed estates, including Vibyholm Castle and Hörningsholm Castle in Södermanland, Katrineholm, Bordsjö, Askeryd and Herrestad in Småland and Sävstaholm and Toftaholm.

He was a member of Halland County Rural Economy and Agricultural Societie's acquisition committee (Hallands läns hushållningssällskaps förvärvsutskott) and member of the Halland County landstorm. Bonde was an inspector of POW camps in Siberia from 1917 to 1918. He was chairman of the Stockholm Harness Horseman's Association from 1900 and chairman and vice chairman of the Swedish Equestrian Central Association in 1933–38. He was a judge of equestrian competitions at the 1932 Olympics in Los Angeles.

== Personal life ==
Bonde was married and divorced twice. He was married 1896–1919 to Blanche Charlotte Eleonore Dickson (1875–1960), daughter of James Fredrik Dickson and Blanche Dickson. Bonde was married a second time 1920–1941 to Ebba Wallenberg (1896–1960), daughter of the banker Marcus Wallenberg, Sr. and Amalia Hagdahl. In the first marriage he was the father of Chief of the Army, Lieutenant General Thord Bonde and Colonel Carl C:son Bonde, and in the latter Peder Bonde, chamberlain and active in the so-called Wallenberg sphere.

Bonde's first wife, Blanche Dickson, inherited Tjolöholm Castle, and they lived there until their divorce in 1919.

== Awards and decorations ==
Bonde's awards:

=== Swedish ===
- (Sweden) King Gustaf V's Jubilee Commemorative Medal (1928)
- (Sweden) Commander 2nd Class of the Order of Vasa
- (Sweden) Knight of the Order of the Sword
- (Sweden) King Gustaf V's Olympic Commemorative Medal (Konung Gustaf V:s olympiska minnesmedalj)
- (Sweden) Medical Gold Medal (Sjukvårdsguldmedalj) (Swedish Red Cross)

=== Foreign ===
- (Latvia) Grand Officer of the Order of the Three Stars
- (Russian Empire) Knight 2nd Class of the Order of Saint Anna
- (Belgium) Knight of the Order of Leopold
- (Belgium) Military Cross Second Class
- (France) Officer of the Ordre des Palmes académiques
- (Kingdom of Prussia) Red Cross Medal First, Second and Third Class
- (Ottoman Empire) Order of the Crescent
- (Austria) Austrian Honour Decoration of the Red Cross, Second Class with decoration
- (Bulgaria) Bulgarian War Commemorative Medal

== Bibliography ==
- Bonde, Carl (1943). Jag berättar för Jan [I am telling Jan] (in Swedish). Stockholm: Medén.
