= Defence Command (Finland) =

Coordinates: 60.1641782°N 24.9496668°E

- Pääesikunta; Huvudstaben
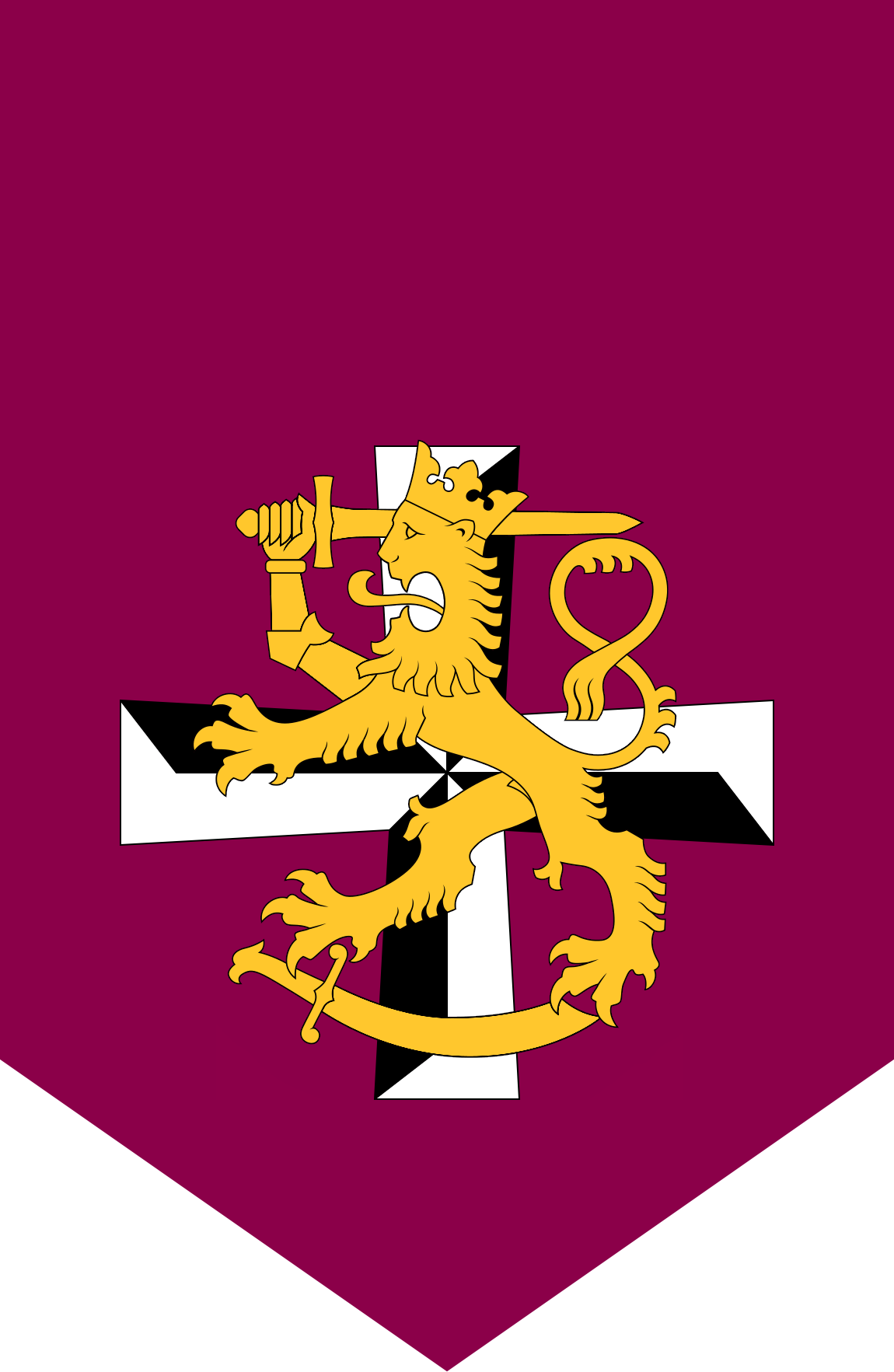
- Colours of Defence Command
- Active: Since 2 February 1918
- Country: Finland
- Type: Joint command headquarters
- Size: 328 military, 186 civilian (2015)
- Part of: Finnish Defence Forces
- Garrison: Guard's Garrison, Fabianinkatu 2, Helsinki, Finland
- Engagements: Finnish Civil War; Winter War; Continuation War; Lapland War
- Website: puolustusvoimat.fi

Commanders
- Chief of Defence: General Janne Jaakkola
- Chief of Staff: Lieutenant General Vesa Virtanen

Defence Command (Finnish: Pääesikunta, Fenno-Swedish: Huvudstaben), organized as Headquarters (Finnish: Päämaja, Swedish: Huvudkvarter) during wartime, is the joint command headquarters of the Finnish Defence Forces and a central government agency. Active since 1918, it leads and monitors the execution of the duties prescribed to the Defence Forces, such as the military defence of Finland.

== History ==
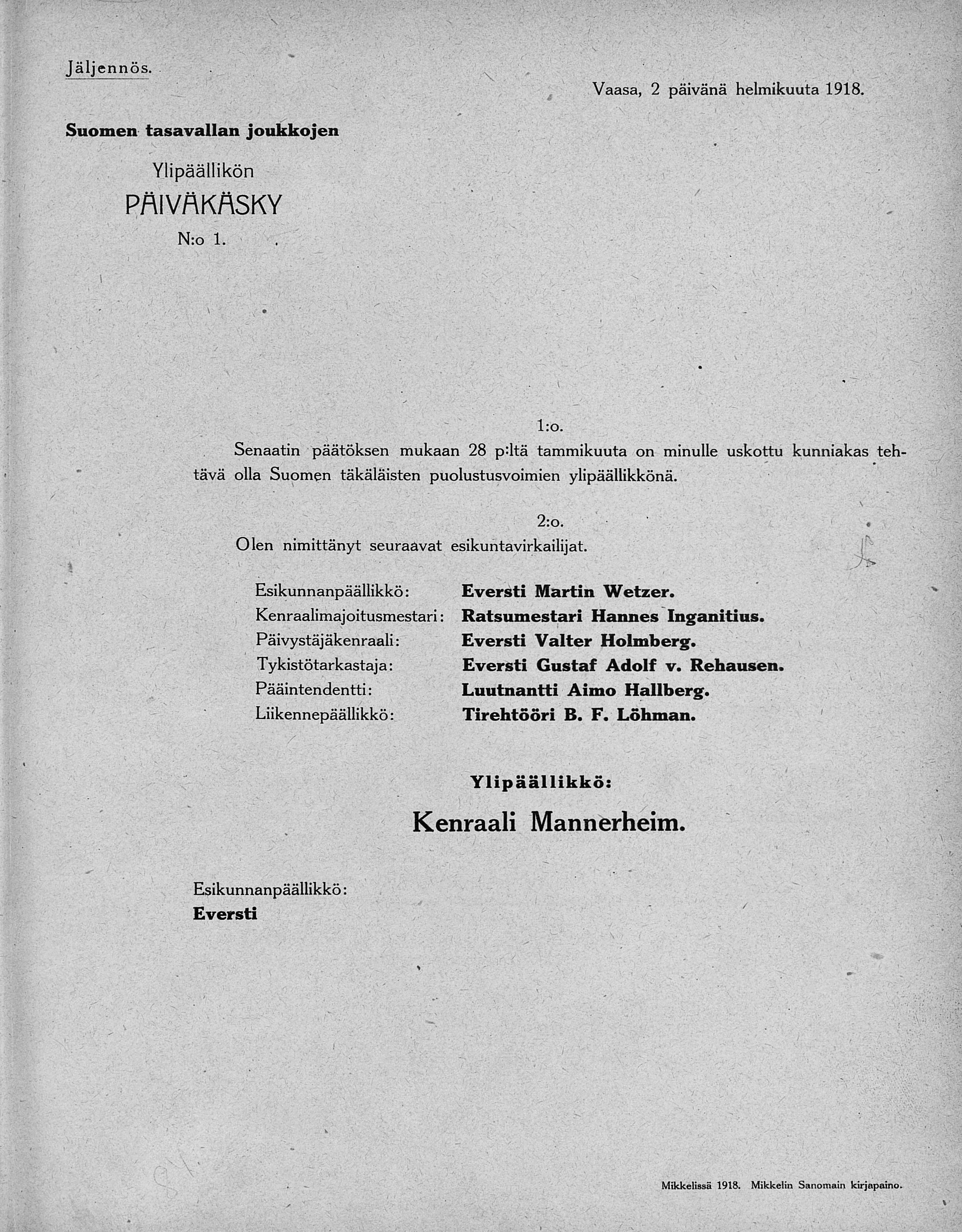
Establishment of the first headquarters of the Finnish Defence Forces on 2 February 1918

Finland declared independence on 6 December 1917 and by the end of the year, a conflict emerging from the strife between the Reds, led by the Social Democratic Party, and the Whites, led by the conservative-based senate, seemed inevitable. On 16 January 1918, Chairman of the Senate of Finland, Pehr Evind Svinhufvud, appointed General Carl Gustaf Emil Mannerheim as the commander-in-chief of the Government's forces and a few days later Mannerheim met with his senior staff at Hotel Ernst in Vaasa, Finland. The Finnish Civil War commenced on 27 January 1918. Defence Command was established as the Headquarters of White Finland's military in Vaasa by the commander-in-chief's day order (Finnish: päiväkäsky, Swedish: dagorder) number 1 on 2 February 1918.

== Organisation ==
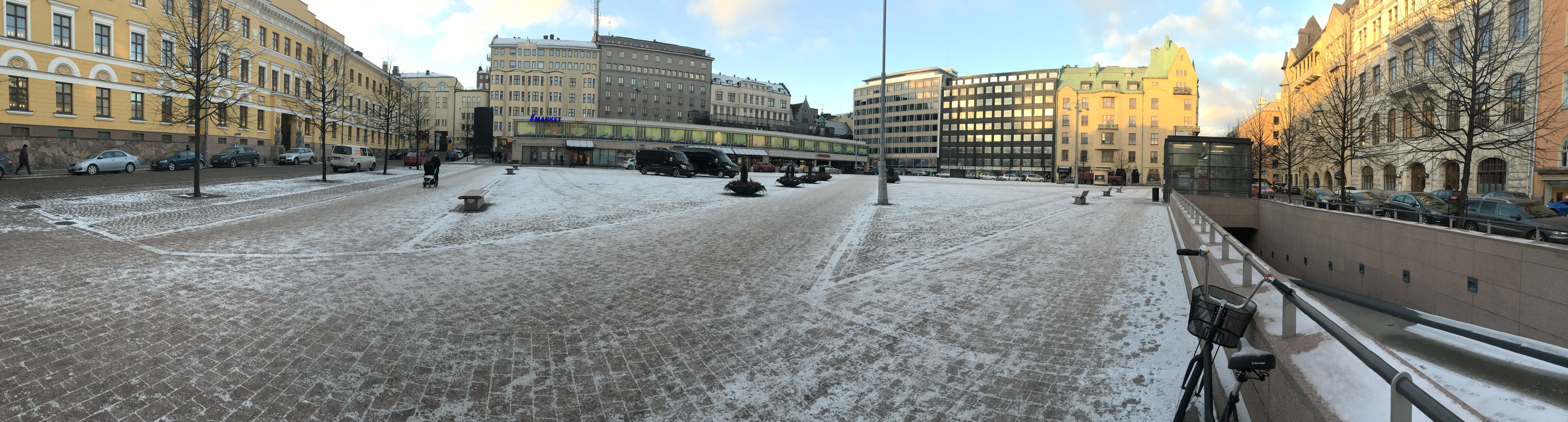
A December 2015 panorama of the Garrison Square (Finnish: Kasarmitori, Swedish: Kaserntorget) with the Defence Command and Ministry of Defence building on the left

Defence Command is subordinate to the Chief of Defence, commander of the Finnish Defence Forces. The Command is responsible for planning and executing joint operations of the Defence Forces as well as guiding and resourcing the three branches of the military, the Finnish National Defence University, and agencies under its control. It is led by the chief of staff, usually a lieutenant general, with four deputy chiefs of staff focusing on personnel, logistics and armaments, operations, and strategy, respectively. Lieutenant General Vesa Virtanen has been the chief of staff since 2022. As of 2015, 328 military and 186 civilian staff served at the Command. Compared to the personnel number of the Ministry of Defence, which is about 140, the Defence Command is a clearly larger organisation. The ministry is responsible only for political-strategic issues, like legislation and the economic framework of the Defence. Most military strategic and all operative planning, as well as operations, are part of the Defence Command portfolio, with the Chief of Defence only keeping the Defence Minister cognizant about command matters that are presented to the President for decision. This type of organisation is seen by the Defence Forces to keep the military command matters outside the political discussion.

In addition to an executive office and an internal audit unit, Defence Command is divided into ten divisions (Finnish: osasto, Swedish: avdelningen) with a continental staff system:

- Executive Office
  - Internal Audit Unit
  - Public Information Division
  - Technical Inspection Division
- Personnel Division (J1)
- Intelligence Division (J2)
- Operations Division (J3)
- Logistics Division (J4/J10)
- Plans and Policy Division (J5/J8)
- C5 Systems Division (J6)
- Training Division (J7)
- Legal Division (J9)

Five subordinate establishments operate under the direction of Defence Command:

- Finnish Defence Forces C5 Agency
- Finnish Defence Intelligence Agency
- Finnish Defence Research Agency
- Shared Services Centre
- Defence Forces Logistics Command

== Infrastructure ==
Defence Command is co-located with the Ministry of Defence in the Kaartinkaupunki neighborhood of Helsinki at the Guard's Garrison, designed by architect Carl Ludvig Engel and completed in 1822. The building served as the original garrison of the Guard of Finland and from 1918 to 1938 as the garrison of the White Guard. It was destroyed during the Continuation War in the February 1944 bombing of Helsinki and rebuilt after the wars as well as supplemented in the 1960s with additional buildings designed by architects Viljo Revell and Heikki Castrén.

== See also ==
- Foreign relations of Finland
- Military strategy
