= El Cuartón =

- Village
- Location in the Province of Cádiz El Cuartón (Spain)
- Coordinates: 36°04′00″N 5°32′12″W
- Country: Spain
- Autonomous community: Andalusia
- Province: Cádiz
- Comarca: Campo de Gibraltar
- Municipality: Tarifa
- Judicial district: Algeciras

Population (2009)
  - Total: 164
- Time zone: UTC+1 (CET)
  - Summer (DST): UTC+2 (CEST)
- Official language(s): Spanish

El Cuartón is a village in the municipality of Tarifa in the Province of Cadiz in southeastern Spain. It is located 13.7 kilometres (8.5 mi) by road southwest of the city centre of Algeciras, along the main road to the southern tip of Spain at Tarifa, which is 9.7 kilometres (6.0 mi) away, and it lies just to the southwest of El Bujeo. According to the National Statistics Institute, El Cuartón had 164 inhabitants in 2009.
