= Operation Stella Polaris =

Evacuation of Finnish signals intelligence establishment to Sweden, 1944

Operation Stella Polaris was the cover name for an operation in which Finnish signals intelligence records, equipment and personnel were transported to Sweden in late September 1944 after the end of combat on the Finnish-Soviet front in World War II. The purpose was to enable the signals intelligence activities against the advancing Russians to continue in Sweden and to prevent the equipment falling into the hands of the Soviet Union. A Soviet invasion was considered likely and plans were made to support guerrilla warfare in Finland after a possible occupation. The operation had its base in the small fishing village of Nämpnäs in Närpes, Ostrobothnia region, from where the archives were shipped to Swedish ports. The leaders of the operation were Colonel Aladár Paasonen, chief of Finnish military intelligence, and Colonel Reino Hallamaa, head of the Finnish signals intelligence section.

== Transportation to Sweden ==
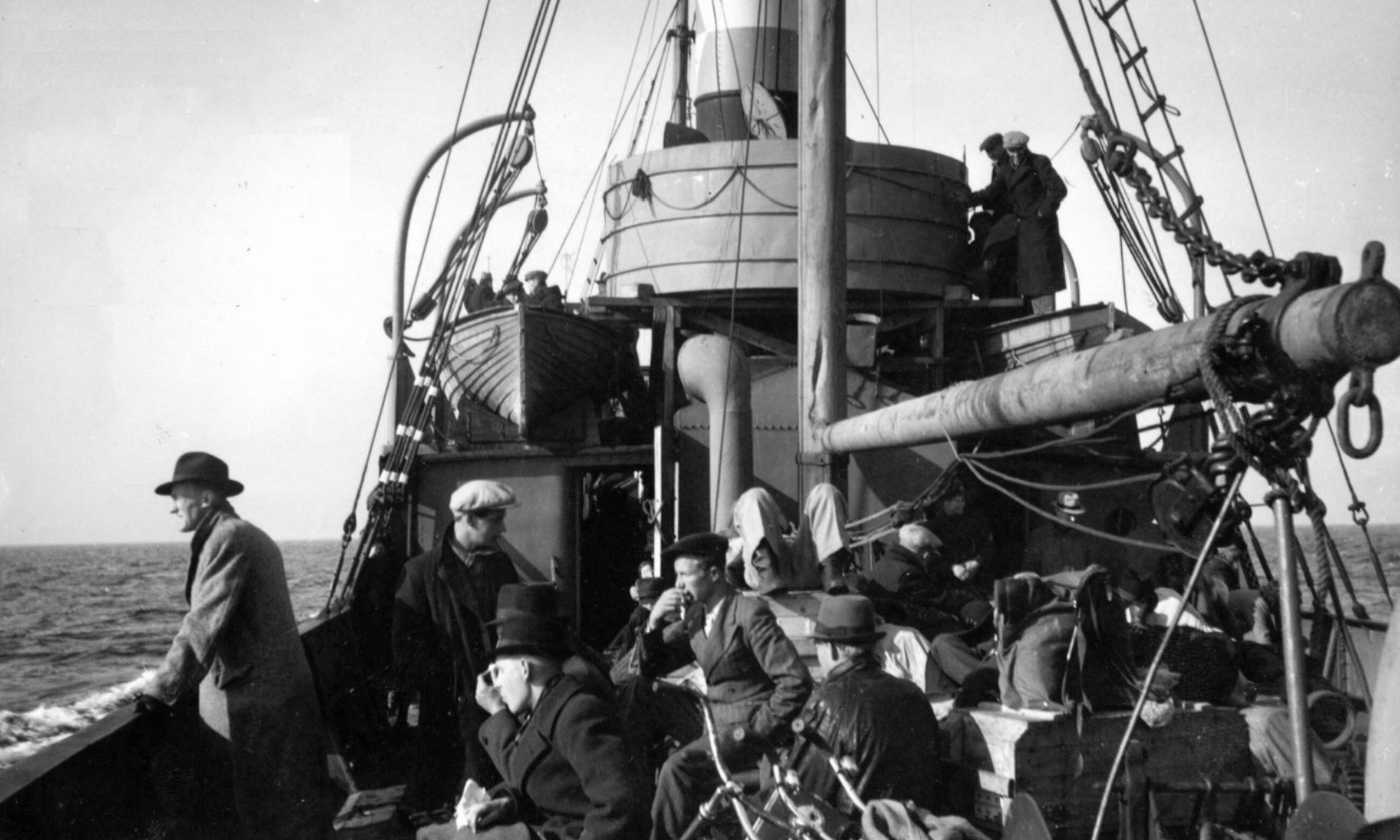
Finnish military intelligence agents onboard a ship travelling from Närpiö (Närpes), Finland, to Härnösand, Sweden, as a part of Operation Stella Polaris, 1944

On 20 September 1944 a large part of the Finnish signals intelligence unit was moved to Sweden. From the Swedish side Major Carl Petersén, head of the Defence Staff's intelligence section C-byrån, was responsible for the operation. Approximately 750 people were transported across the Gulf of Bothnia: by three ships from Närpes to Härnösand; and one ship from Uusikaupunki to Gävle. The ships also carried boxes of archives and signals intelligence equipment.

After the Soviet Union was ceded parts of Karelia and Salla from Finland on 19 September 1944, in accord with the Moscow Armistice, the majority of the Finnish personnel and their families returned home, except those hired by Sweden's National Defence Radio Establishment (FRA). They crossed the border at the Torne River in secret. Sweden offered to take over the equipment and some of the documents. The FRA thus had access to technical equipment and seven boxes of files, which became important in the newly established activities of the FRA.

Operation Stella Polaris led to Sweden gaining access to a large amount of high quality intelligence. It also learnt signals intelligence techniques from the Finnish personnel, some of whom the Swedes hired. For Finland, the operation resulted in domestic political entanglements as a result of the Finnish People's Democratic League's strong influence in government. These included action against several of those involved in the operation for so-called "anti-Soviet" activities, resulting in prison sentences.

== Processing in Sweden ==
From October 1944 the intelligence material was moved to the basement of the Hotel Aston in Stockholm. There, the Finnish operations leader Reino Hallamaa microfilmed the material, which he sold to several countries' intelligence agencies. Later the material was removed by the FRA. Large parts of the material were then stored by Carl C:son Bonde at Hörningsholm Castle, and twenty-nine boxes by Svante Påhlson at Rottneros Manor in Rottneros from 20 March 1945. Seven boxes of material had previously been submitted to the FRA. In the early 1960s, the secret documents from Operation Stella Polaris were burned at Lövsta garbage dump in Stockholm on the instruction of the then Director-General of FRA, Gustaf Tham, and the now-retired General Carl Ehrensvärd.

The Finns involved in Operation Stella Polaris were persecuted and arrested after their return to Finland by the Communist-dominated State Police. It was not until the early 1950s that the Finnish Chancellor of Justice declared those who participated in Operation Stella Polaris would not be subject to war crimes proceedings.

== Later events ==
In the village of Nämpnäs there is a memorial to the operation. 15–20 Finnish signal technicians who travelled to Sweden in Operation Stella Polaris were immediately made Swedish citizens and remained as FRA employees in Sweden. The Finnish military intelligence chief Aladár Paasonen, who together with Reino Hallamaa had the main responsibility for the operation, worked with the American forces in Germany in the mid-1950s and later lived until the 1970s in the United States. Reino Hallamaa moved to Spain, where he started a construction company.

== See also ==
- Operation Gladio
- Weapons Cache Case
- Viestikoelaitos
