= Bujeo =

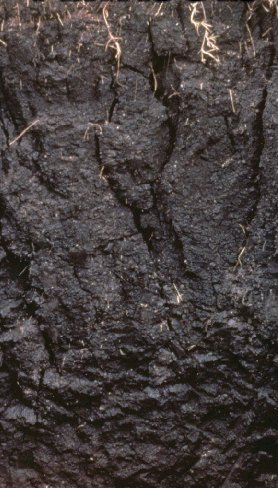
Bujeo soil profile

Bujeo is a type of soil found on the countryside of Andalusia, mainly the area of the Guadalquivir valley.

The color ranges from yellowish brown to olive brown gray and dark gray to almost black, depending on their composition. One of its main features is its columnar structure, strong and deep cracks in the dry state when dealing with materials rich in clays expansive. The texture is silty clay to clay. Their pH ranges from neutral to moderately alkaline, and organic matter content is generally low.

Because of the way these loamy clay soils "swell in winter and crack deeply in summer", they are called "tierras de bujeo", which literally means "land that moves".
