= Heikki Paasonen (linguist) =

Finnish linguist and ethnographer (1865–1919)

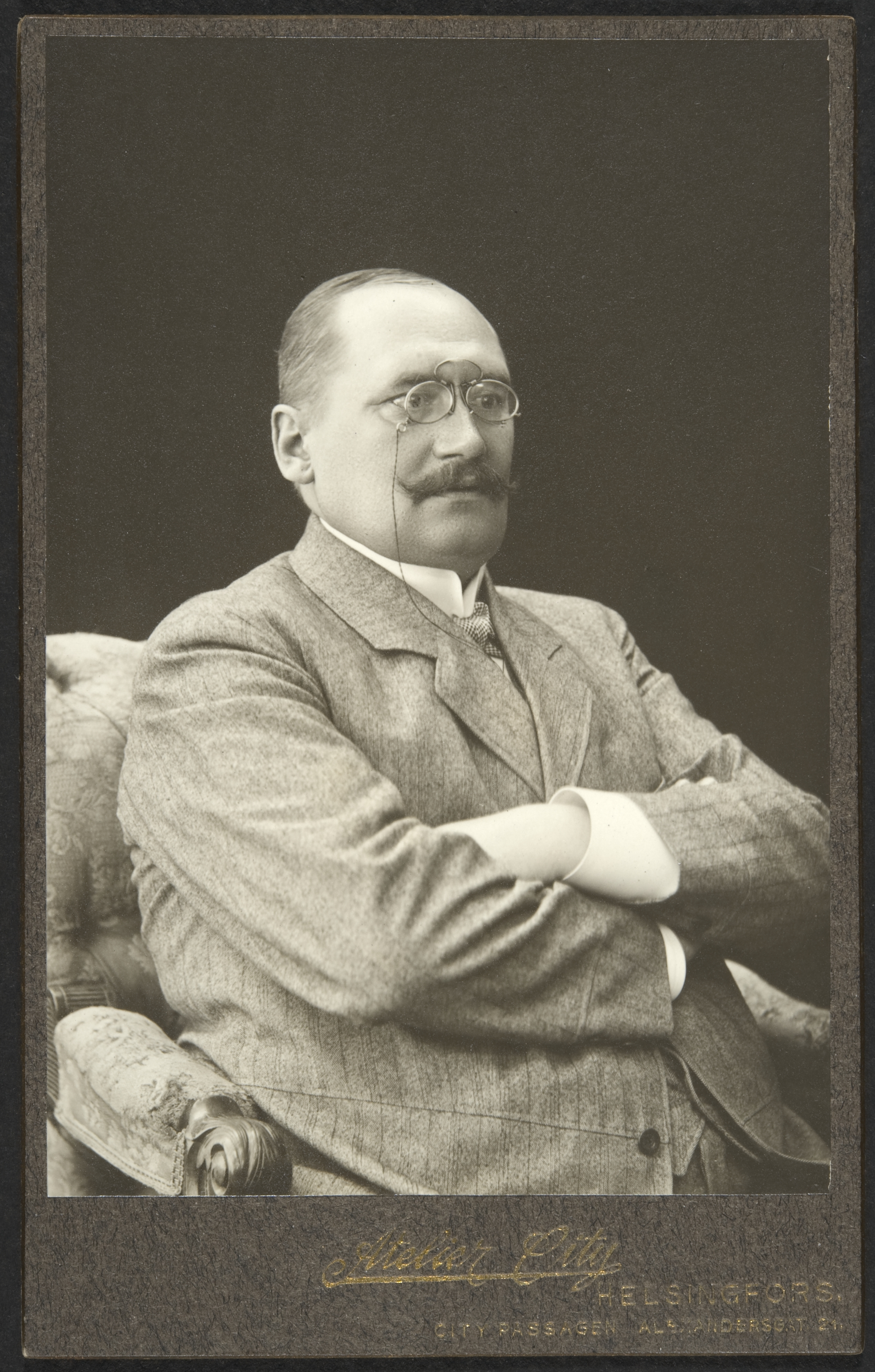
- Born: 2 January 1865; Mikkeli
- Died: 24 August 1919 (aged 54); Helsinki
- Other name: Russian: Генрих Иванович Паасонен
- Citizenship: Grand Duchy of Finland
- Education: University of Helsinki
- Known for: Uralic and Turkic Studies
- Spouse: Mariska Paskay de Palásth
- Children: 4 including Aladár Paasonen
- Scientific career
- Thesis: Mordvinische lautlehre (1894)
- Notable students: Ignatij Zorin

Heikki Antinpoika Paasonen (2 January 1865 – 24 August 1919) was a Finnish linguist and ethnographer best known for his research in the linguistics and folklore of the Mokshas and the Erzyas during his two research trips to Russia. His studies include works on Chuvash, Mishar Tatar, Meadow Mari and Khanty languages, which led to further discoveries in Finno-Ugric and Turkic studies.

== Biography ==
Paasonen was born in Mikkeli, the son of the merchants Anders Paasonen and Fredrika Matiskainen. He became a student at the Swedish-language lyceum in Mikkeli in 1881 and graduated with a bachelor's degree in philosophy in 1888 and worked from the following year until 1890 as a researcher with the Mokshas and Erzyas. The subject of his dissertation in 1893 was Mordvinic phonetics. In 1894, Paasonen became a Doctor of Primus and Docent of Finno-Ugric Linguistics. Paasonen made research trips to the Finno-Ugric peoples, including Hungary, collecting linguistic and ethnographic material. In 1902 he became the Chief Inspector of the School Board, and professor of Finno-Ugric linguistics at the University of Helsinki from 1904 to 1919.

Paasonen's research and collections were published quite extensively, many of them after his death. The collection Mordwinische Volkslieder I-IV was published by Paavo Ravila from 1938 to 1947, and the dialect dictionary of Mordvinic languages based on Paasonen's materials, H. Paasonens Mordwinisches Wörterbuch was edited since the 1930s and finally published in 1990 to 1996; it became the basis of lexicological research in these languages. His collections of Khanty were published as a 1926 dictionary and a series of five text collections from 1980 to 2001, edited by Kai Donner and Edith Vértes, respectively; his Mari materials in 1939 edited by Paavo Siro; his Chuvash materials in 1948 edited by E. Karahka and Martti Räsänen.

== Family ==
Paasonen's spouse since 1894 was Hungarian-born Mariska Paskay de Palásth. Colonel Aladár Paasonen was their son. Their other children were Maria Aranka Gizela, Arvid and Ilona Anna. He died in Helsinki in 1919.

== Works ==
- Heikki Paasonen. Matkakertomus mordvalaisten maalta, SUSA XVII, 3. Helsinki 1890
- Heikki Paasonen. Die Türkischen Lehnwörter im Mordwinischen. Helsingfors, 1897
- Heikki Paasonen. Mordvinische Lautlehre. Helsingfors, Druckerei der Finnischen Litteraturgesellschaft, 1903
- Heikki Paasonen. Die finnisch-ugrischen s-laute. Helsinki, Société finno-ougrienne, 1918
- Heikki Paasonen. Beiträge zur Aufhellung der Frage nach der Urheimat der finnisch-ugrischen Völker. Turku, Turun Suomalaisen Yliopiston Kustantama, 1923
- Heikki Paasonen; Kai Donner. Ostjakisches Wörterbuch, nach den Dialekten an der Konda und am Jugan. Helsingfors, Société finno-ougrienne, 1926
- Heikki Paasonen. Mordvalaiset, Suomen suku II. Helsinki 1928
- Heikki Paasonen; M E Evsevʹev; Mordwinische Volksdichtung. Helsinki, Suomalais-ugrilainen Seura, 1938–1981
- Heikki Paasonen. H. Paasonens Ost-Tscheremissisches Wörterbuch. Helsinki, Suomalais-ugrilainen Seura, 1948
- Heikki Paasonen. Eino Karahka; Martti Räsänen. Gebräuche und Volksdichtung der Tschuwassen. Helsinki, Suomalais-ugrilainen Seura, 1949.
- Heikki Paasonen. Çuvaş sözlüğü. İstanbul : İbrahim Horoz Basımevi, 1950.
- Heikki Paasonen. Mordwinische Chrestomathie mit Glossar und grammatikalischem Abriss. Helsinki, Suomalais-ugrilainen Seura, 1953
- Heikki Paasonen. Eino Karahka. Mischärtatarische Volksdichtung. Helsinki, Suomalais-ugrilainen Seura, 1953
- Heikki Paasonen; T Janurik. Tschuwaschisches Wörterverzeichnis. Szeged: Universitas Szegediensis de Attila József Nominata, 1974
- Heikki Paasonen; Kaino Heikkilä; Paavo Ravila; Martti Kahla. Mordwinische Volksdichtung Bd. 5. Helsinki, Suomalais-Ugrilainen Seura 1977
- Mordwinische Volksdichtung. Gesammelt von Ignatij Zorin, Durchgesehen u. transkribiert von Heikki Paasonen, übers. von Kaino Heikkilä u. Paavo Ravila, Herausgeg von Martti Kahla. V. Band. SUST 161. Helsinki 1977, Suomalais-Ugrilainen Seura.
- Mordwinische Volksdichtung. Gesammelt on Ignatij Zorin, Durchgesehen u. transkribiert von Heikki Paasonen, übers. von Kaino Heikkilä u. Paavo Ravila, Herausgeg von Martti Kahla. VI. Band. SUST 162. Helsinki 1977, Suomalais-Ugrilainen Seura.
- Heikki Paasonen. Edith Vértes. H. Paasonens südostjakische Textsammlungen. Helsinki, Suomalais-ugrilainen Seura, 1980
- Heikki Paasonen; Kaino Heikkilä; Hans-Hermann Bartens; A P Feoktistov; G I Ermushkin; Martti Kahla. H. Paasonens Mordwinisches Wörterbuch. Helsinki, Suomalais-ugrilainen seura, 1990–1996
- Heikki Paasonen; Edith Vértes. H. Paasonens surgutostjakische Textsammlungen am Jugan. Helsinki, Suomalais-Ugrilainen Seura, 2001

== Literature ==
- Федотов М. Р. Исследователи чувашского языка / М.Р. Федотов. — 2. изд., доп. — Чебоксары, 2000. — ISBN 5767703922

== Sources ==
- Ilmari Heikinheimo: Biography of Finland. Helsinki: Werner Söderström Osakeyhtiö, 1955. Page 566.
- Paasonen Helsingin yliopiston sivuilla
- Heikki Paasonen on worldcat.org

== See also ==
- Finno-Ugrian Society
