= Aladár Paasonen =

Finnish military officer

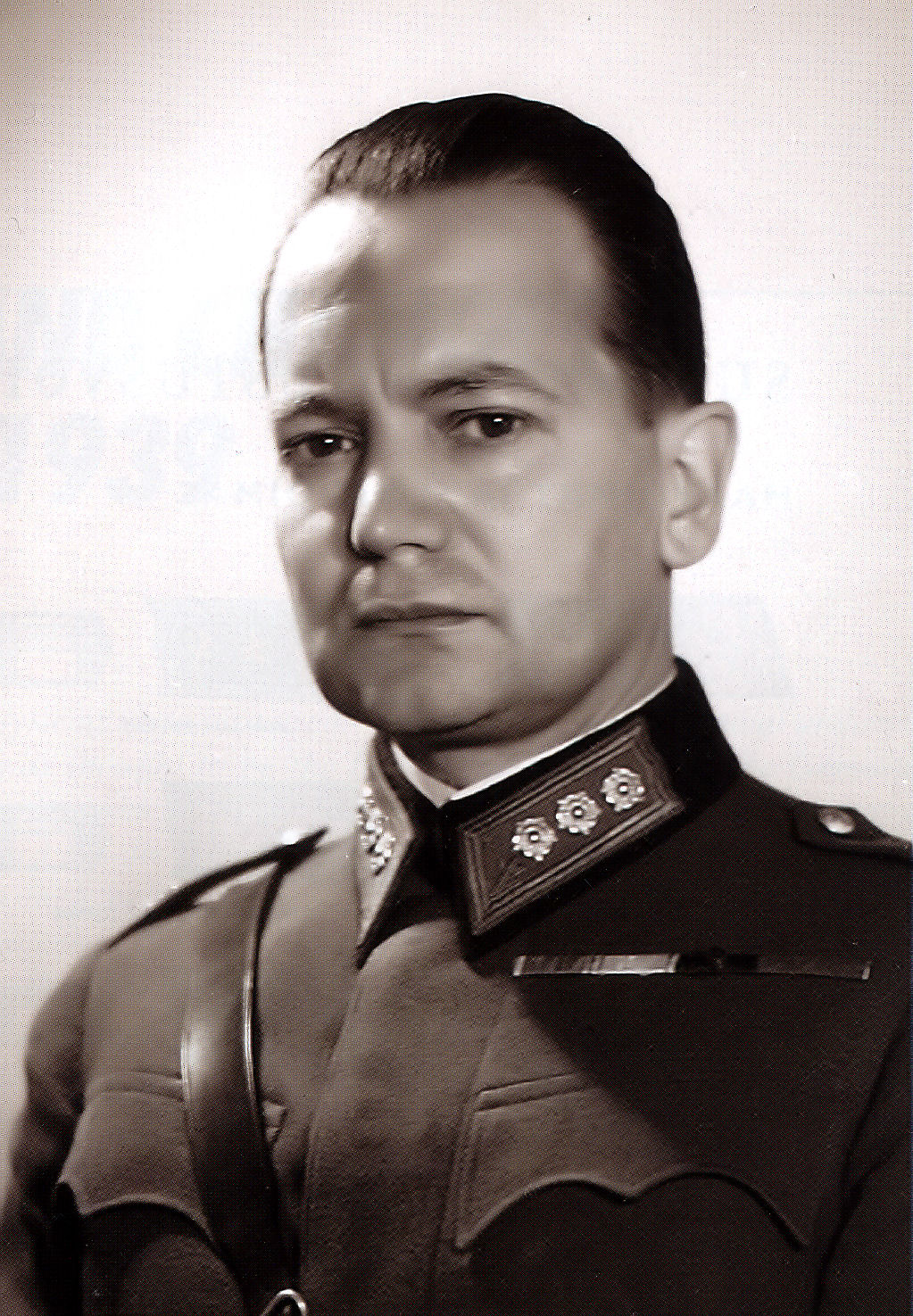
Aladár Paasonen

Colonel Aladár Antero Zoltán Béla Gyula Árpád Paasonen (December 11, 1898 in Budapest, Austria-Hungary – July 6, 1974 in Flourtown, Pennsylvania, United States), known as Aladár Paasonen, was a Finnish military officer who served as Chief of Intelligence of the Finnish Defence Forces during the Continuation War, and later in the CIA.

Paasonen was born in Budapest, Hungary, son of the Finnish professor of linguistics Heikki Paasonen and his Hungarian wife Mariska Paskay de Palásthy.

Paasonen participated in the Finnish Civil War on the White side, reaching the rank of sub-lieutenant. In 1920, he was promoted to lieutenant. Between 1921 and 1922 he studied at the École Supérieure de Guerre, where Charles de Gaulle was among his classmates.

In 1923, Paasonen was promoted to captain, in 1926 to major, and in 1929 to lieutenant colonel. He served as the Finnish military attaché in Moscow from 1931 to 1933 and in Berlin in 1933. In 1937, he was promoted to colonel, and he was appointed senior adjutant to President Kyösti Kallio.

Paasonen was member of the Finnish delegation to Moscow in the negotiations prior to the Winter War. During the Winter War, he was stationed in Paris, France, with a mission to procure weapons and equipment for the Finnish Defence Forces. France awarded him the Légion d'honneur (1939), rank Officier.

During the Continuation War, Paasonen commanded a regiment in the Karelian Isthmus and East Karelia, until he was appointed Chief of Intelligence in 1942. He worked in the Military Headquarters in Mikkeli as one of Marshal Mannerheim's closest aides.

After the war, Paasonen, having participated in the Operation Stella Polaris and the Weapons Cache Case, relocated to Sweden, and was recruited by the French intelligence services, and later by the CIA, working for them in Western Europe in the post-war period. In the late 1950s, the Paasonen family lived on Platenstrasse in Frankfurt while Aladár worked in the IG Farben building. Between 1948 and 1952, he helped Marshal Mannerheim write his memoirs in Switzerland. He retired in 1963, living in the United States until his death in 1974. He was buried in a family grave in Hietaniemi Cemetery in Helsinki, Finland.
