= Hörningsholm Castle =

Castle in Sweden

- Sweden
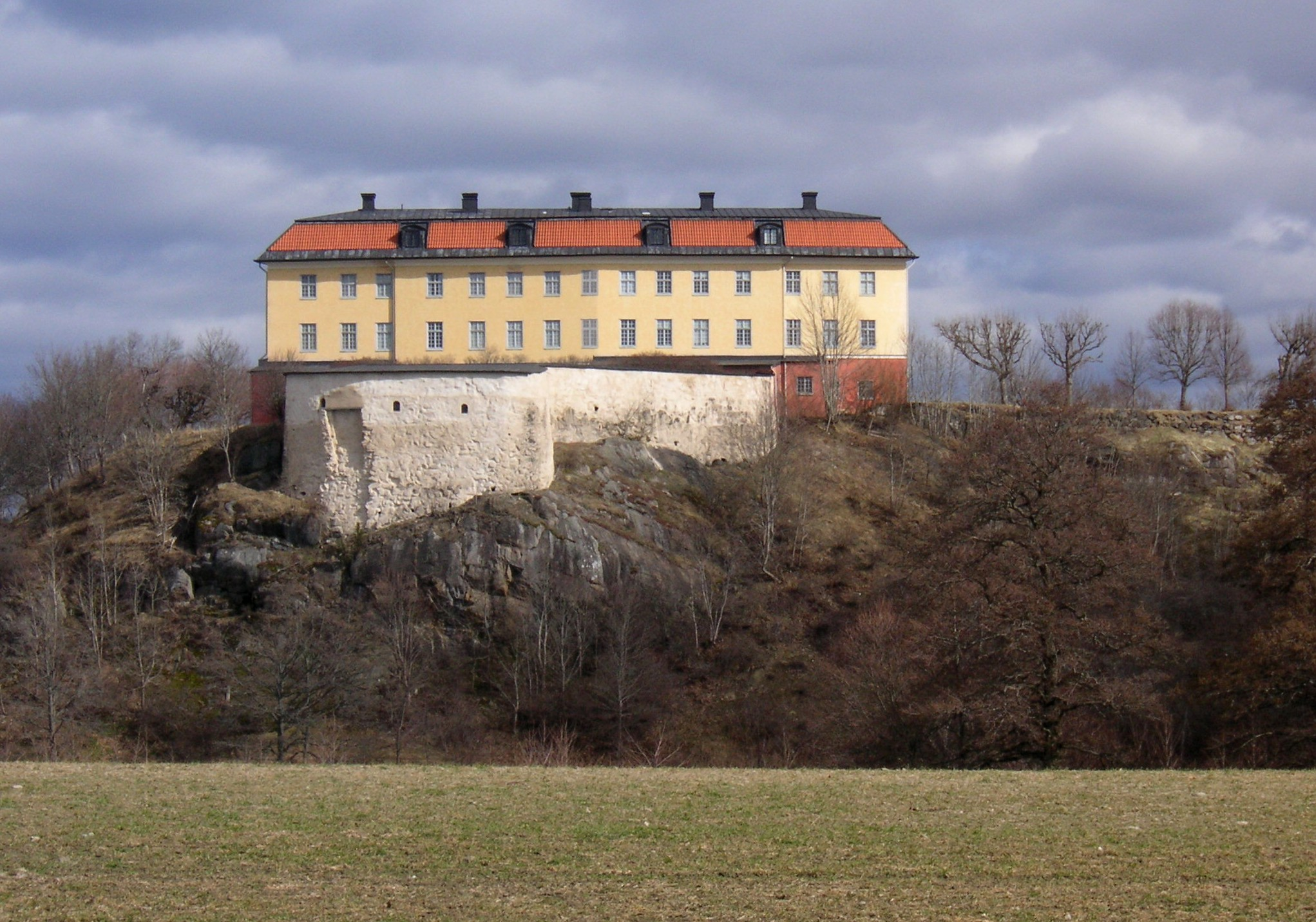
- View of Hörningsholm Castle from the west

Site information
- Type: Castle
- Open to the public: No

Location
- Coordinates: 59°03′03″N 17°39′57″E

Site history
- Built: Probably late 15th century
- Built by: Probably Nils Bosson Sture
- Battles/wars: Pillaged by Danish troops 1520; Burnt by Russian troops 1719

Hörningsholm Castle (Swedish: Hörningsholms slott) is a manor house and former castle in Sweden. It is located on a cliff by an inlet of the Baltic Sea some kilometres from Södertälje. The castle was most probably built by the Sture family during the late 15th and early 16th century, was burnt to the ground by Russian troops in 1719 and rebuilt in its present shape by architect Carl Hårleman. It was renovated in 1919–20 by architect Ivar Tengbom.

== History ==
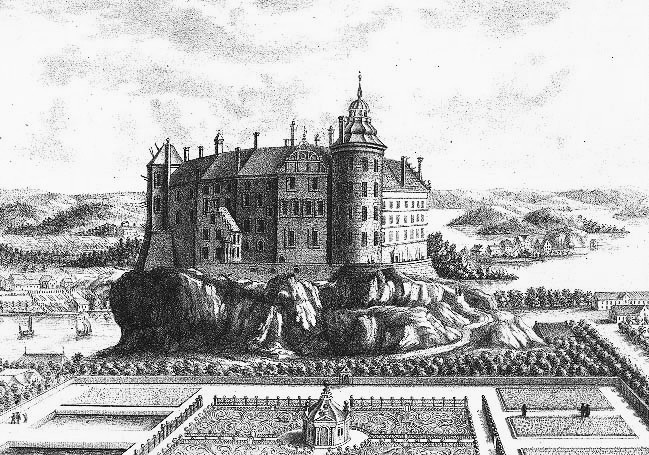
The castle as depicted in Suecia antiqua et hodierna, before being burnt in 1719

The foundations of the presently visible building, including the basements, date from a castle that was erected on the cliff most probably at the end of the 15th century, when the land was owned by Nils Bosson Sture. The history of the estate, however, goes even further back, although earlier there was no fortification on the site.

The preceding farmstead was by 1260 in the possession of a landowner called Karl Ulfsson, who joined the Teutonic Order in a crusade against non-Christians in the present-day Baltic states. He died in the Battle of Durbe and in his will left several of his farms to the Teutonic Order. It is therefore possible but not certain that the land for a while was in the possession of the crusader order. Little is known of the fate of the farmstead until the 15th century, when it is known to have been in possession of one Erengisle Nilsson (died 1469); his widow sold the land to Nils Bosson Sture who most probably began construction of the castle.

It stayed in the Sture family until 1616. The family built and expanded the castle into a late Medieval–Renaissance castle. In 1520, it was occupied by a garrison of 70 Danish troops who pillaged the castle, but they were driven out by troops loyal to Gustav Vasa during the Swedish War of Liberation. After 1616 the castle had several different owners, among them Johan Oxenstierna.

In 1719, during the Russian Pillage of 1719-1721, the castle was burnt to the ground by Russian troops. Reconstruction of the castle did not start until 1746, when the castle was sold to Nils Bonde af Björnö (who had himself been taken prisoner by the Russians at the Surrender at Perevolochna). The reconstruction was finished in 1752. The property has since then stayed in the Bonde family. It is today (2014) owned by Carl Bonde.

== Architecture ==
The medieval castle consisted of two stone buildings, connected with walls reinforced with at least two towers, in a way that created an enclosed space. It was an unusually large and elaborate private castle, and could be compared in size and importance to the castles belonging to the royalty. During the second half of the 17th century, the Swedish government considered buying the castle in order to strengthen the defence of the country. Of the original medieval castle, ramparts and cellars remain today. In 1824, a dungeon was discovered under the floor of one of the basement rooms; it had clearly been used as a prison and semi-decomposed remains of human bodies were identified within the room.

When Hårleman made the new designs for the reconstructed castle, he retained very little of the medieval superstructures. Instead, he aimed to create a building inspired by the ideals of French Rococo. The presently visible castle is thus a relatively symmetrical edifice, with two square, one-storey wings. He also reconstructed some of the ramparts into a terrace.

The castle contains the art collection of the Bonde family, as well as highly accomplished interior details such as cocklestoves. The castle also contains a large private library.

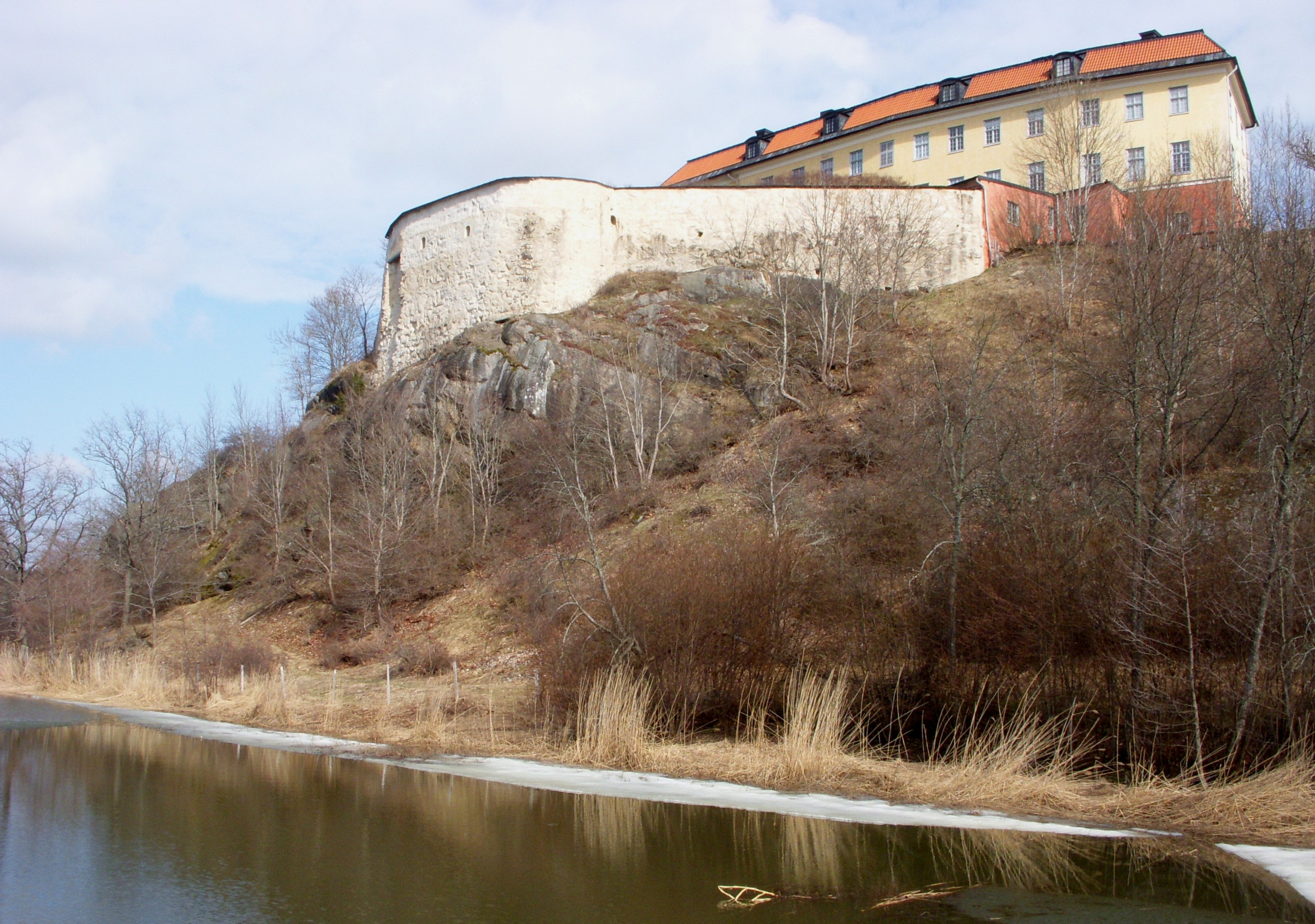
Facade from the southwest

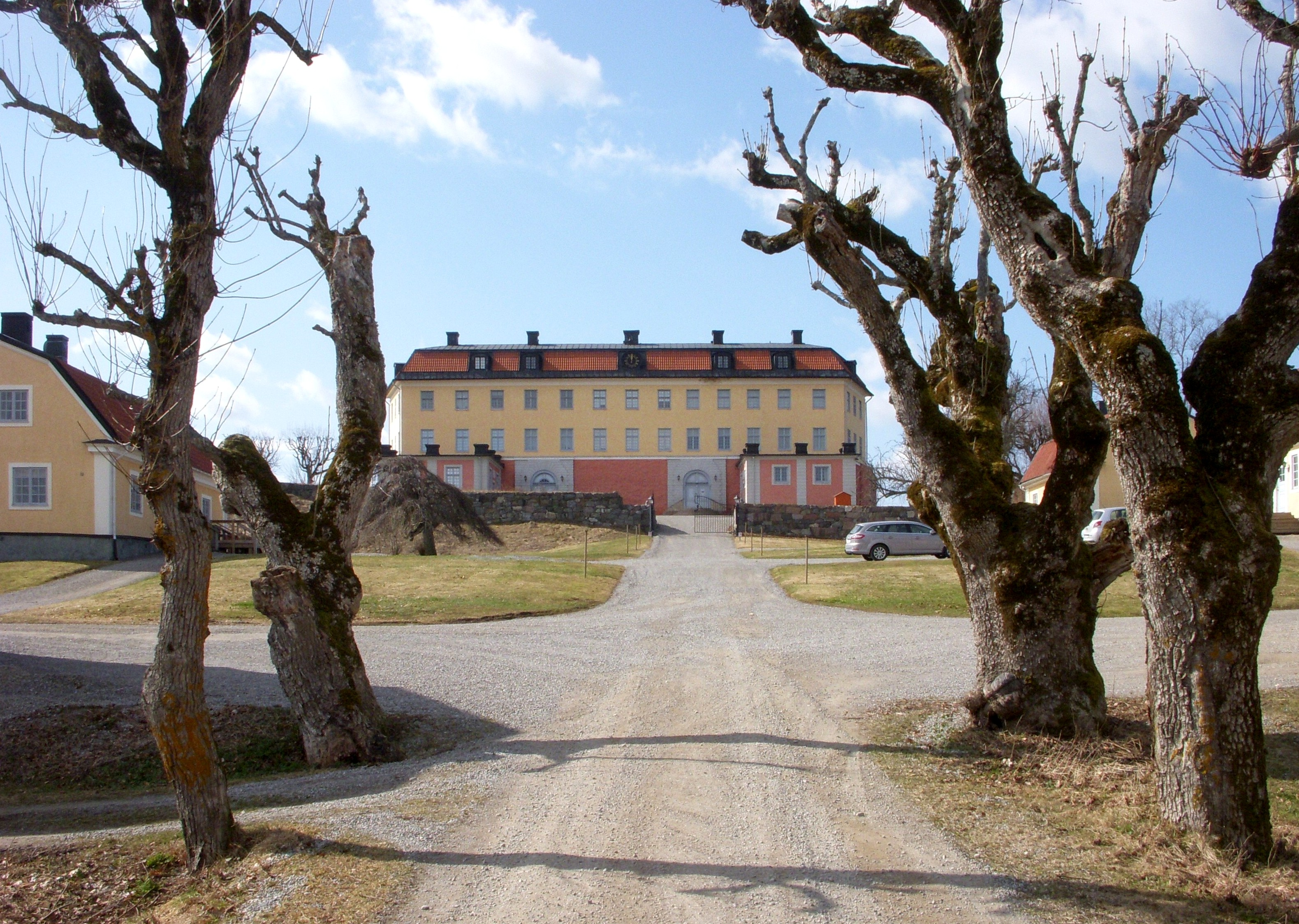
View with the avenue from the east

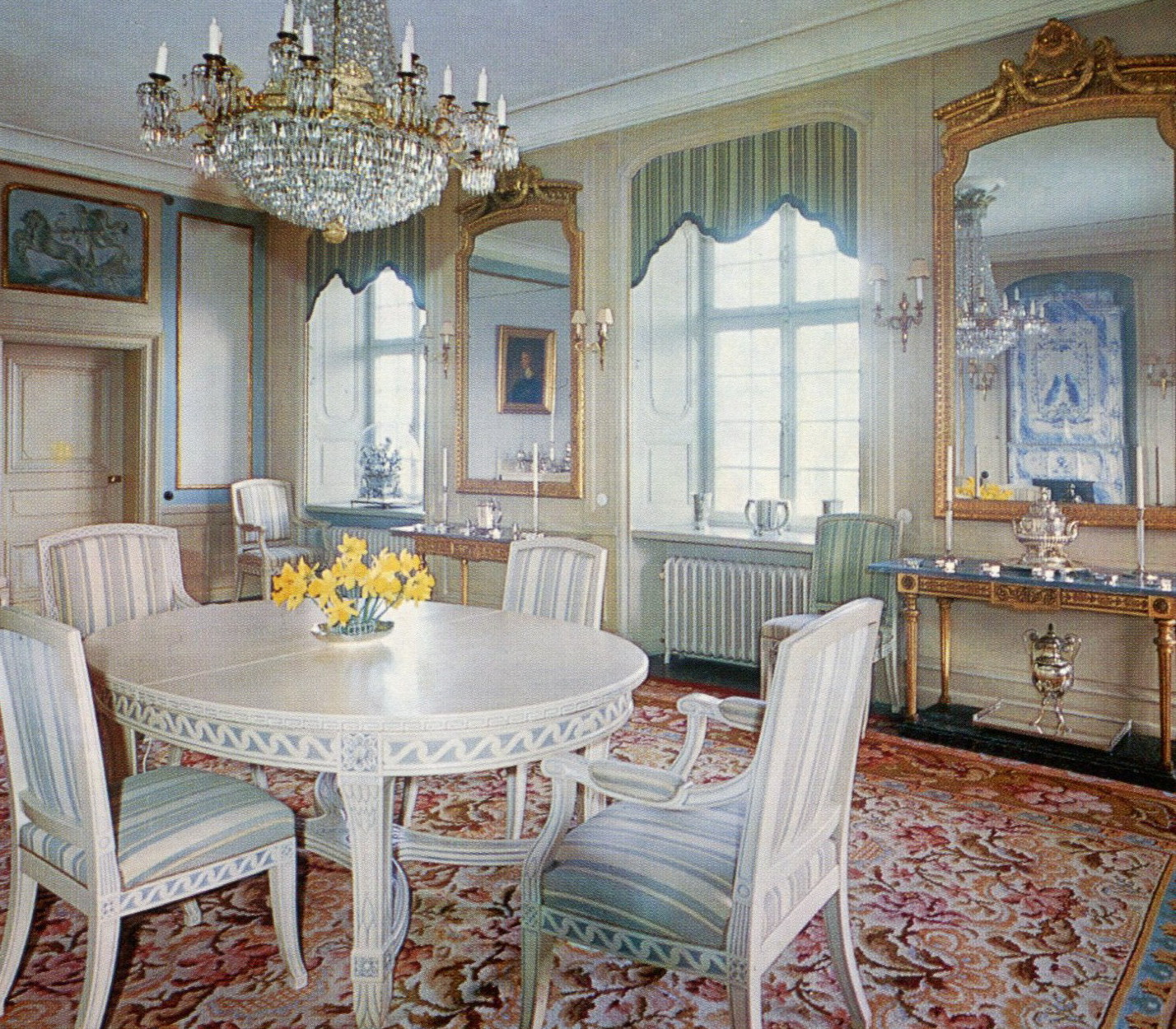
The dining room

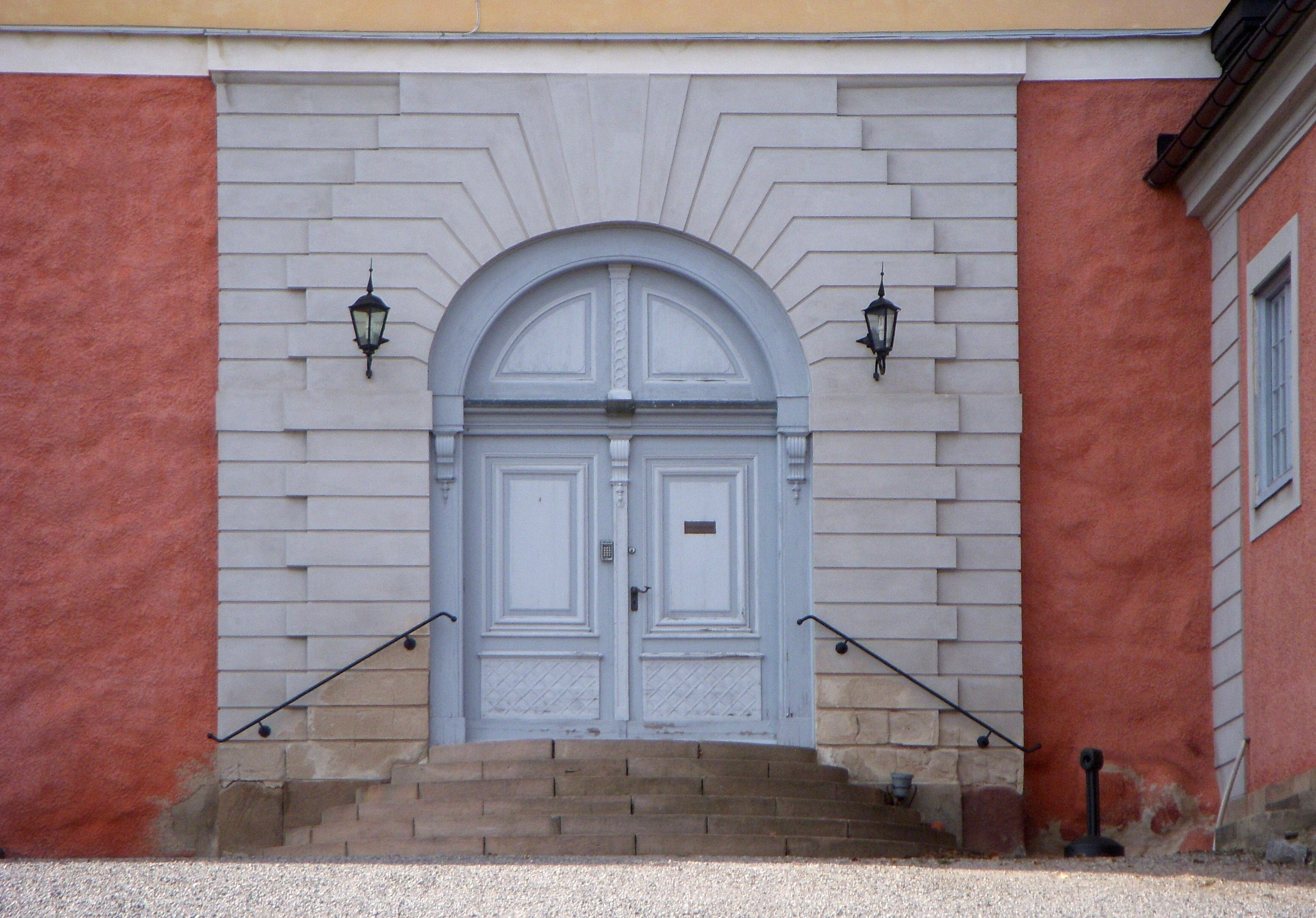
The entrance portal

== See also ==
- List of castles in Sweden
