= Agreement on Defense Cooperation between Finland and the United States of America =

2024 bilateral treaty

The Defense Cooperation Agreement (DCA) is a bilateral treaty between Finland and the United States on military cooperation and their mutual obligations as NATO member states. The DCA entered into force on September 1, 2024.

The United States shares similar agreements with Bulgaria, Latvia, Lithuania, Norway, Poland, Sweden, Slovakia, the Czech Republic, Hungary, and Estonia.

== History ==
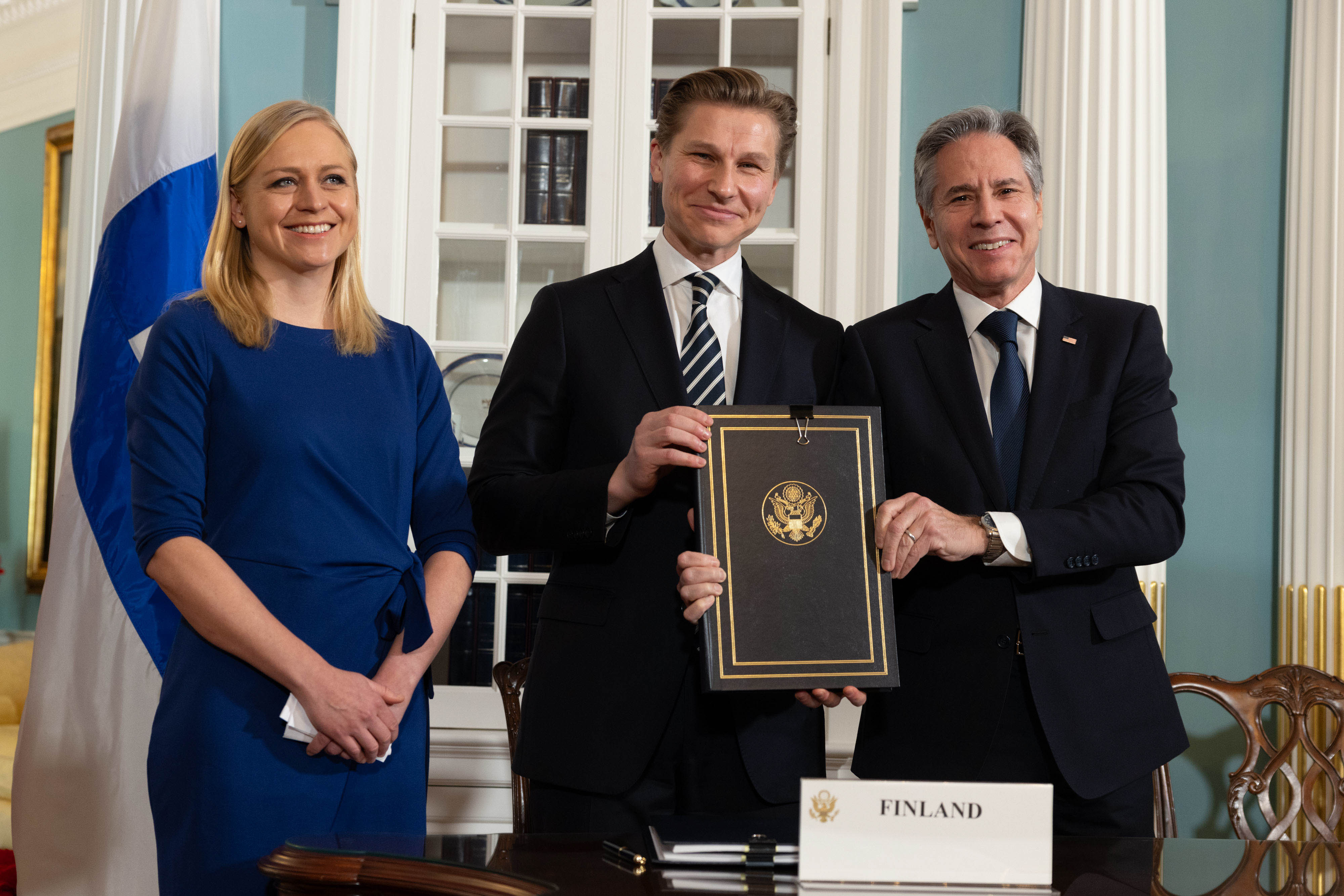
Finnish Foreign Minister Elina Valtonen (left) and Defense Minister Antti Häkkänen (center), along with U.S. Secretary of State Antony Blinken (right), at the signing of the DCA on December 18, 2023.

Finland had previously joined the NATO military alliance in April 2023 in the wake of the 2022 Russian invasion of Ukraine. On February 3, 2023, the President of Finland, Sauli Niinistö, appointed a delegation of military and government officials to negotiate a bilateral defense cooperation agreement with the United States. These negotiations were formally initiated in March 2023. Following the conclusion of the negotiations, the Finnish government proposed to Niinistö in its December 14 general session that Defense Minister Antti Häkkänen, or in his stead Foreign Minister Elina Valtonen, be authorized to sign the DCA. Niinistö accepted the proposal the following day. On December 18, 2023, the agreement was signed by Häkkänen and U.S. Secretary of State Antony Blinken in a ceremony at the Embassy of Finland in Washington, D.C.

Following its signing, the DCA was submitted to the Parliament of Finland for review on May 30, 2024. On June 24, 2024, its Constitutional Law Committee announced that approval of the DCA would require a qualified two-thirds majority vote. The only Member of Parliament to oppose the agreement was the Left Alliance's Anna Kontula, who motioned to reject the DCA but was not supported by any other legislators. The DCA was thus unanimously ratified without a vote on July 1, 2024.

== Content ==
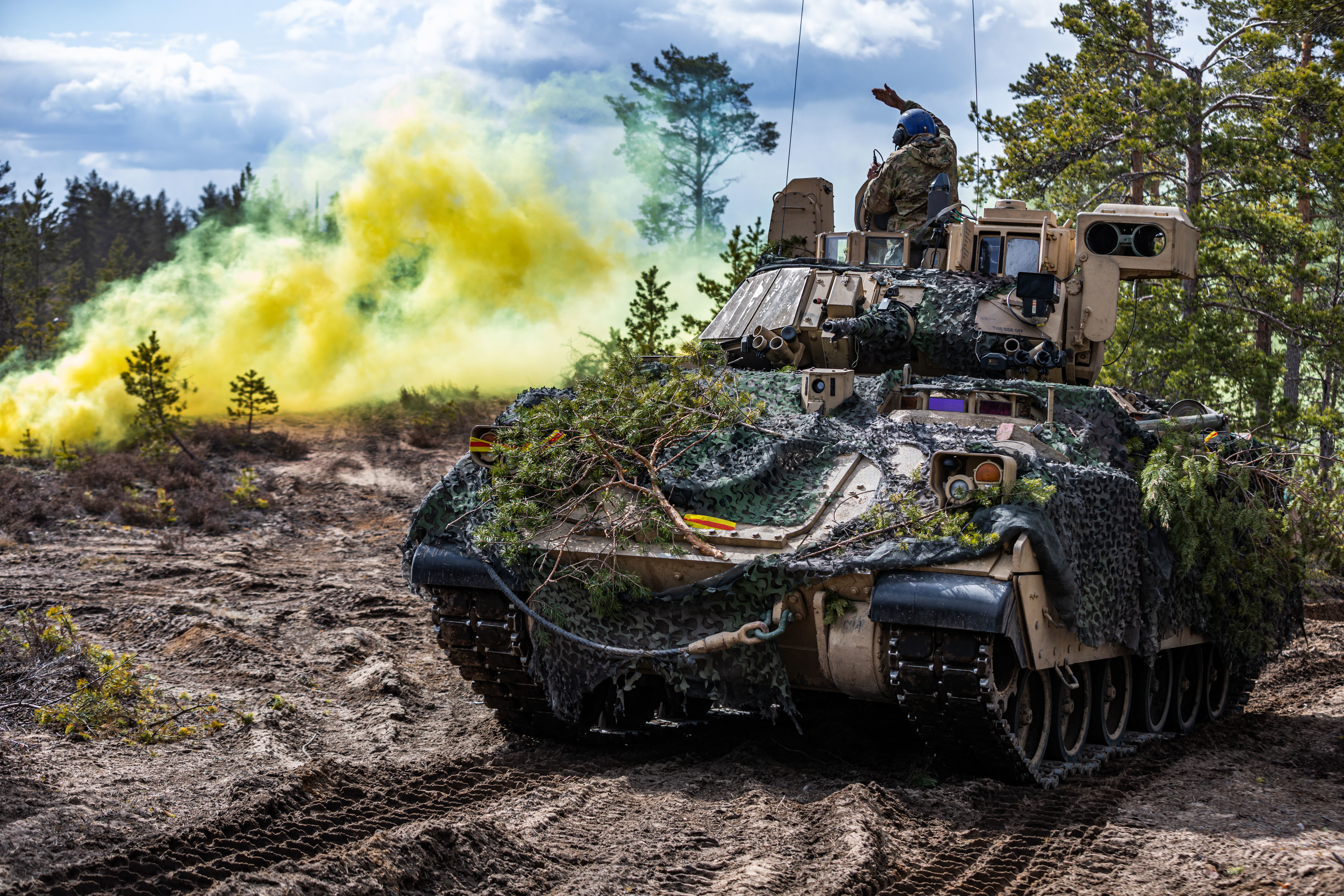
U.S. soldiers pilot the M2 Bradley Vehicle during the Arrow 23 exercise in Niinisalo, Finland on May 5, 2023. It was an armored forces exercise involving troops from Finland, the United States, the United Kingdom, Latvia, Lithuania and Estonia.

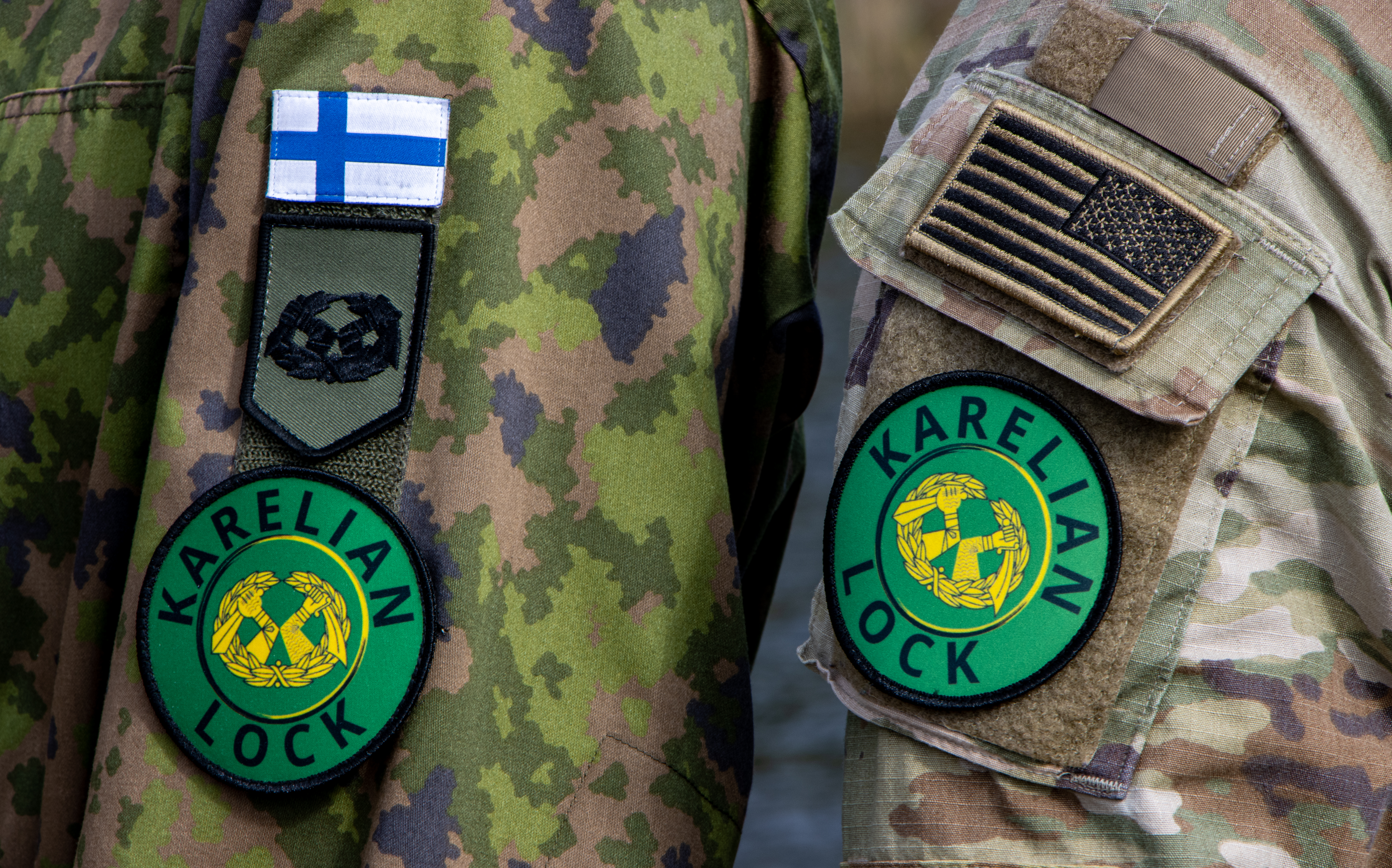
A Finnish soldier from the Karelia Brigade stands next to an American soldier from 1st Cavalry Division, displaying their patches for the Karelian Lock 23 training exercise

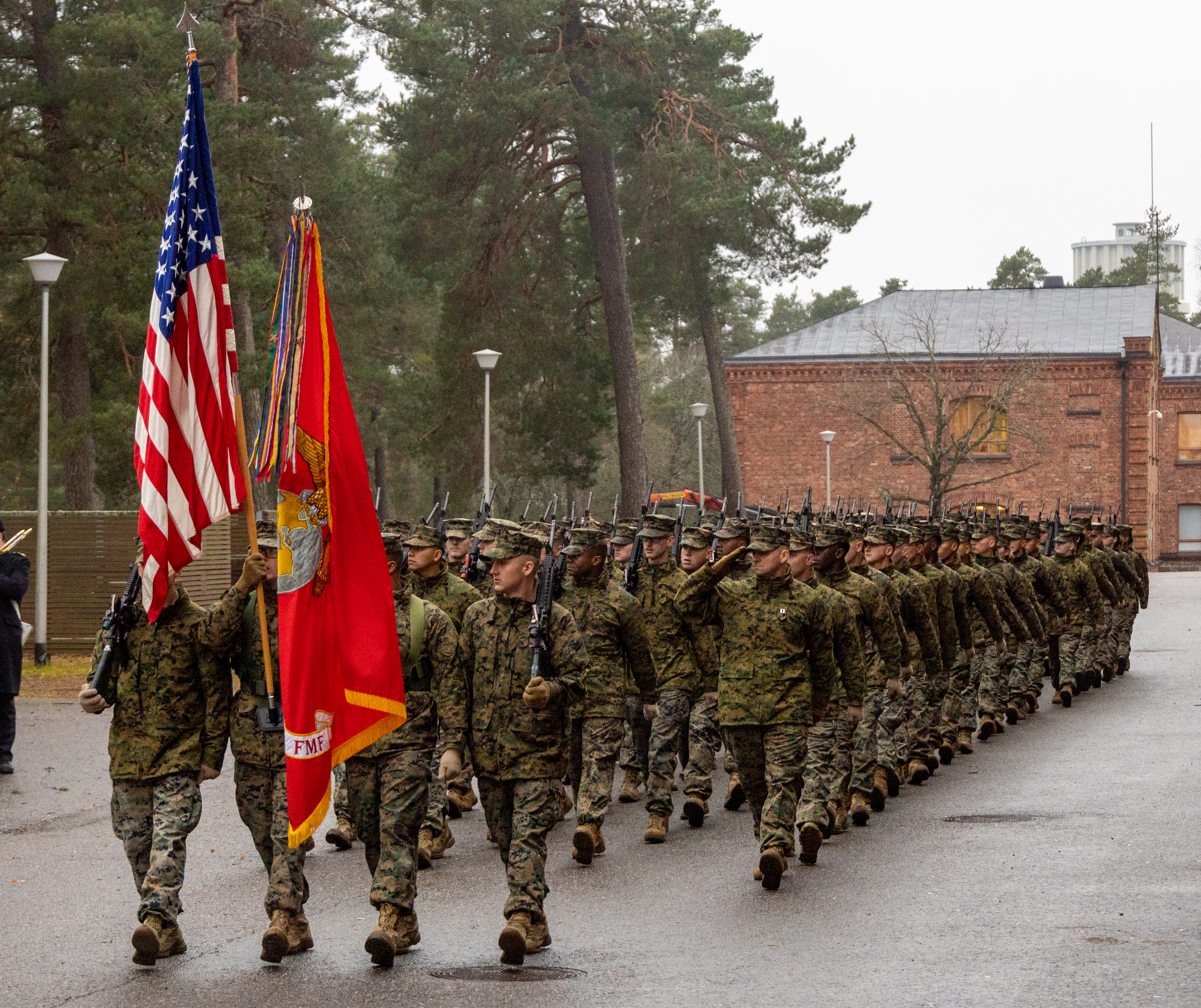
U.S. Marines participate in the Swedish Heritage Parade in Dragsvik, Finland on November 5, 2023

The purpose of the DCA is to improve military cooperation between Finland and the United States, especially with regards to the advance storage of materiel and the deployment of American troops to Finland. Specifically, Finland granted American troops access to the following military facilities:

1. The Finnish Border Guard's barracks in Ivalo
2. The Karelia Air Wing's base at Kuopio Airport in Rissala
3. The Pori Brigade's garrison in Niinisalo and its nearby Pohjankangas-Hämeenkangas training area
4. A storage area in Parkano
5. The Nyland Brigade's garrison in Dragsvik, Raseborg and Syndalen training area in Hanko
6. The Rovajärvi training area and Misi storage area in Lapland
7. The Lapland Air Wing's air base and the Jaeger Brigade's garrison, both located in Rovaniemi
8. A storage area in Skinnarvik, Kimitoön
9. A storage area in Letku,Tammela
10. The Satakunta Air Command's air base in Pirkkala
11. A storage area in Tervola
12. The Air Force Academy in Tikkakoski
13. A naval base and garrison in Upinniemi and the island of Russarö, south of Hanko
14. Storage areas on in Veitsiluoto and the nearby island of Ajos in Kemi
15. The Karelia Brigade's Vekaranjärvi garrison and Pahkajärvi training area, both in Kouvola

The DCA stipulates that the United States is only responsible for the construction, operation, and maintenance costs of facilities that only American troops use, and will not be charged rent. Meanwhile, facilities shared by the United States Armed Forces and Finnish Defense Forces are funded by each country in proportion to their respective usage. The agreement does not explicitly prohibit nuclear weapons but defers to Finnish law and international agreements, such as the Nuclear Energy Act prohibiting the transit and storage of nuclear weapons in the country.

Generally, American troops alleged to have committed criminal offenses will be tried by American courts under the DCA. However, if a case is of special importance to Finland, jurisdiction over it can be transferred to Finnish courts on a case-by-case basis. These include "socially significant" crime, sex crime, and crime "against life and health." The United States is also responsible for determining whether specific instances of its military activities are carried out in "connection with an official mission" in Finland.

== Criticism ==
The signing of the treaty was met with disapproval by the Russian Ministry of Foreign Affairs, which responded by summoning Finnish Ambassador Antti Helanterä to protest the increased deployment of NATO troops to the Finland–Russia border. The Finnish Ministry for Foreign Affairs replied that Finland had already called a separate meeting regarding the border with Russia.

The agreement has also aroused resentment among the local Sámi people, as they were completely ignored in defense policy decision-making, even though international agreements and declarations signed by Finland, the Finnish Constitution, and the act on the Sámi Parliament oblige the authorities to consult with the Sámi on all decisions and actions that may have significant impacts on the Sámi's traditional livelihoods and culture, and in addition, the UN's Declaration on the Rights of Indigenous Peoples explicitly prohibits the military use of indigenous peoples' lands before the matter has been consulted with the indigenous people in question. The state has also not responded to the Sámi Parliament's requests to organize consultations in accordance with Section 9 of the Sámi Parliament Act during the implementation phase of NATO membership and the DCA agreement. Although the Sámi Parliament does not oppose international defense cooperation, the negotiations would have been considered important to prevent and minimize harm to the livelihoods and culture of the Sámi, as the increasing military exercises challenge the traditional livelihoods of the Sámi in many ways; for example, exercises in the Arctic region put a strain on nature and significantly disrupt reindeer herding, causing costs and additional work for reindeer herders that have not been properly compensated to date.

== See also ==
- Agreement on Defense Cooperation between the Czech Republic and the United States of America
- Finland–United States relations
- Finland–NATO relations
