= DCA =

DCA may refer to:

== Computers ==
- Document Content Architecture, an IBM document standard
- Dynamic Channel Allocation/Assignment, in wireless networks
- DTS Coherent Acoustics in DTS (sound system)

== Government ==
- California Department of Consumer Affairs
- Department for Constitutional Affairs of the UK government, 2003-2007
- Department of Civil Aviation (Australia)
- Department of Civil Aviation (Thailand)
- Namibia Directorate of Civil Aviation

== Military ==
- Agreement on Defense Cooperation between the Czech Republic and the United States of America, known as the Defense Cooperation Agreement
- Agreement on Defense Cooperation between Finland and the United States of America, known as the Defense Cooperation Agreement
- Defence Cyber Agency, a tri-service command of the Indian Armed Forces
- Defense Communications Agency, former name of the US Defense Information Systems Agency
- Defensive counter air (Défense contre les aéronefs), French term for air defense
- Deputy Commandant for Aviation, principal advisor on all aviation matters in the United States Marine Corps
- Dual-capable aircraft, used in nuclear sharing

== Companies and other organizations ==
- Christian Democracy for Autonomies, a former political party in Italy
- DCA Design, a product design and development company based in Warwick, England
- Digital Communications Associates, an American company
- Distributors Corporation of America, American film distribution company (1952-1959)
- Diversity Council Australia, an Australian independent not-for-profit, promoting diversity and inclusion in the workplace
- Diyanet Center of America, a non-profit center funded by the Turkish Government in Lanham, Maryland, US
- Drum Corps Associates, a governing body of drum corps in North America
- Dublin Castle administration, Ireland
- Dundee Contemporary Arts, Scotland

== Science and technology ==
- Detrended correspondence analysis, a statistical technique
- Dichloroacetic acid / dichloroacetate, an organic acid
- Dichloroethanes, organic solvents
- Digitally-controlled amplifier
- Direct coupling analysis, a method for analyzing sequence data in computational biology
- Directional component analysis, a multivariate statistical technique used in the atmospheric sciences
- Drone congregation area, a location where bees gather to mate

== Transportation ==
- DCA, IATA code for Ronald Reagan Washington National Airport, Arlington County, Virginia, US
- Dutch Caribbean Airlines, former Netherlands Antilles airline

== Other uses ==
- Debt Collection Agency, companies specialized in pursuing payments of debts
- Direct corporate access, part of UK Faster Payments Service
- Disney California Adventure, Anaheim, California, US
- Dollar cost averaging, an investment strategy

== See also ==
- DCAS (disambiguation)
