= DCAS =

DCAS may be:

- DCAS keys, control keys on the computer keyboard, see Arrow keys § DCAS keys
- Deputy Chief of the Air Staff (disambiguation), a military air force position
- Derive computer algebra system
- Double compare-and-swap (DCAS or CAS2), an atomic primitive proposed to support certain concurrent programming techniques
- Downloadable Conditional Access System
- New York City Department of Citywide Administrative Services
- D/CAS (Data/CASsette), a streamer cassette using an audio compact cassette (audio cassette tape) for data storage

== See also ==
- DCA (disambiguation), for the singular of DCAs
