= Finnish Defence Forces International Centre FINCENT =

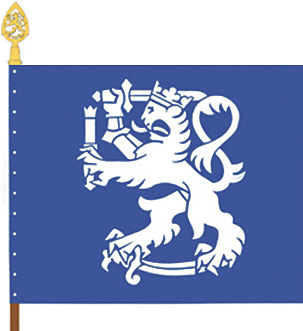
Flag of the FINCENT

Finnish Defence Forces International Centre FINCENT (Finnish: Puolustusvoimien kansainvälinen keskus PVKVK, Swedish: Försvarsmaktens internationella center) is a unit of Finnish Defense Forces located in Helsinki. FINCENT organizes courses, seminars and exercises with the European Union, United Nations and NATO.

== History ==
FINCENT was established in 1969 as the United Nations Training Centre (Finnish: YK-Koulutuskeskus) which was based in Niinisalo. In 2001 the name was changed to Finnish Defence Forces International Centre. In the 2008 re-organization the crisis management operations were handed to the Pori Brigade and the other functions were transferred to Hyrylä. In 2015 FINCENT became part of Finnish National Defence University and was relocated to Helsinki. The FINCENT field exercise area still works in Niinisalo.

== Sources ==
- Finnish Defence Forces International Centre FINCENT The Finnish Defense Forces
