= Christmas Star =

Christmas Star or Christmas star may refer to:

- Star of Bethlehem, said to have revealed the birth of Jesus and showed the wise men the way to Bethlehem
- Froebel star, a Christmas decoration made from paper
- Moravian star, a Christmas decoration
- Poinsettia, a plant species of the diverse spurge family
- A star-shaped tree-topper
- "Christmas Star", a composition by John Williams in the 1992 film Home Alone 2: Lost in New York
- A Christmas Star, a 2015 British Christmas film
- The 2020 great conjunction between Jupiter and Saturn, widely referred to as the "Christmas Star" in the media.
