= Artillery Brigade (Finland) =

Coordinates: 61°49′58″N 022°28′23″E

- Tykistöprikaati
- Insignia of the Artillery Brigade
- Active: 26 May 1794–1811: Finska artilleriregementet (Finnish Artillery Regiment) Swedish Army; 1918–1952: Kenttätykistörykmentti 1 (Field Artillery Regiment 1); 1952–1956: Kenttätykistörykmentti 2; 1957–1992: Satakunnan tykistörykmentti (Satakunta Artillery Regiment, SatTR); 1992–2014: Tykistöprikaati (Artillery Brigade)
- Country: Finland
- Branch: Finnish Army
- Type: Field artillery
- Size: 400 career personnel 1,100 conscripts
- Garrison: Niinisalo, Kankaanpää
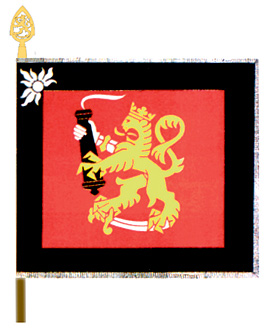
- Colors
- March: "Tykistöprikaatin kunniamarssi"
- Main training equipment: D-30, 155 K 98, 155 K 83, MLRS
- Decorations: Order of the Cross of Liberty
- Battle honours: Civil War of Finland; Winter War; Continuation War

The Artillery Brigade (Finnish: Tykistöprikaati) was a Finnish Army unit stationed in Niinisalo in western Finland. The Artillery Brigade trained conscripts and regular personnel for wartime artillery duties. In addition, it provided weather service in the Niinisalo region, and trained most of the Finnish Defence Forces' dogs. The total strength of the brigade was some 800 conscripts and 400 regular civilian and military personnel. On 1 January 2015, it was merged with the Pori Brigade.

The Artillery Brigade consisted (in 2001–2013) of the Satakunta Artillery Regiment, the Reconnaissance Battalion, the Artillery School, and the Satakunta Military Band. Every year, some 1,600 conscripts were trained by the brigade. The Satakunta Artillery Regiment fielded two cannon batteries, with equipment ranging from 122 mm light howitzers to 155 mm cannons and a support battery consisting entirely out of signals personnel and spotters. The regiment continues as a part of the Pori Brigade.

The Reconnaissance Battalion fielded a heavy rocket launcher battery, a UAV battery, a headquarters battery as well as a UAV reconnaissance battery. The conscripts participated in several live-fire exercises in the nearby firing range at Pohjankangas, before the two- or three-week-long national live-fire artillery exercise held once a year in Rovajärvi firing range in Lapland. In 2013, as a preliminary of the merger with the Pori Brigade, the 3rd Infantry Company was established as a part of the Reconnaissance Battalion. In 2015, the Reconnaissance Battalion was disbanded and its functions divided between Finland Proper Logistics Battalion, Satakunta Artillery Regiment and Ostrobothnia Jaeger Battalion.

The Artillery School, which was a part of the Artillery Brigade, provided university-level education for future artillery officers and continuing education for artillery regular personnel. The same function continues, but the School is now part of the Army Academy.
