= Honkajoki =

- Former municipality
- Honkajoen kunta Honkajoki kommun
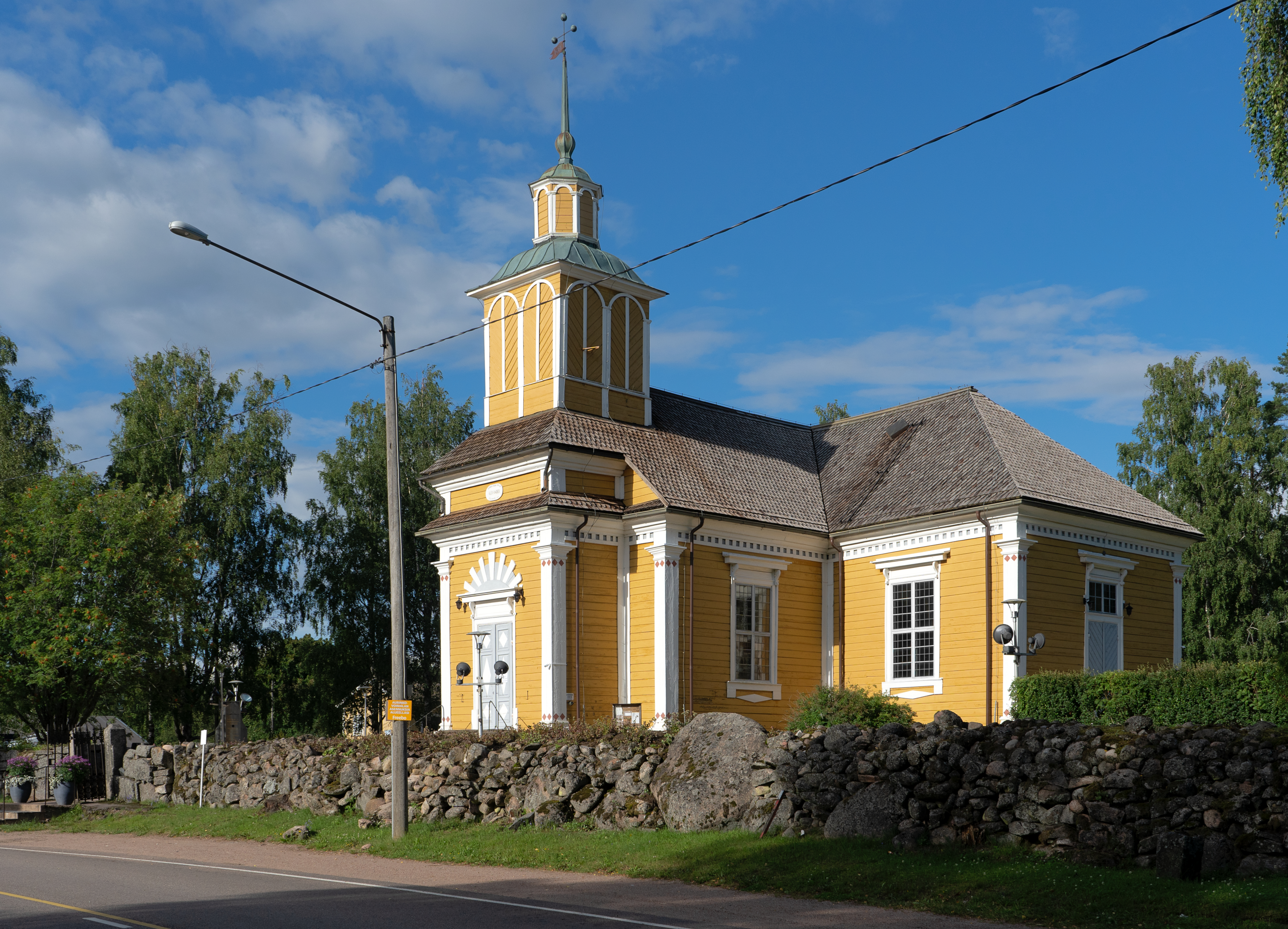
- Honkajoki Church

- Coat of arms

- Location of Honkajoki in Finland
- Coordinates: 61°59′35″N 22°15′50″E
- Country: Finland
- Region: Satakunta
- Sub-region: Pohjois-Satakunta sub-region
- Charter: 1867
- Consolidated: 2021

Area
  - Total: 333.13 km^{2} (128.62 sq mi)
  - Land: 331.22 km^{2} (127.88 sq mi)
  - Water: 1.8 km^{2} (0.69 sq mi)

Population (2020-12-31)
  - Total: 1,595
  - Density: 20.76/km^{2} (53.8/sq mi)

Population by age
  - 0 to 14: 13.4%
  - 15 to 64: 55.4%
  - 65 or older: 31.2%

Population by native language
  - Finnish: 96.5% (official)
  - Swedish: 0.3%
  - Others: 3.3%
- Time zone: UTC+02:00 (EET)
  - Summer (DST): UTC+03:00 (EEST)
- Municipal tax rate: 22.50%
- Climate: Dfc
- Website: www.honkajoki.fi

Honkajoki (Finnish: [ˈhoŋkɑˌjoki]; Hongonjoki until 1952) is a former municipality of Finland. It was merged with the town of Kankaanpää on 1 January 2021.

It was located in the province of Western Finland and was part of the Satakunta region. The population of Honkajoki was 1,595 (31 December 2020) and the municipality covered an area of 331.22 km^{2} (127.88 sq mi) of which 1.8 km^{2} (0.69 sq mi) was inland water (1 January 2018). The population density was 20.76/km^{2} (53.8/sq mi). The municipality was unilingually Finnish.

The wooden tankard called haarikka in the coat of arms of Honkajoki represent local handicrafts, while the star comes from the coat of arms of Satakunta region. The coat of arms was designed by Ahti Hammar and was confirmed in 1952.

In the 1980s, clot soup and lamb stew potatoes were named Honkajoki's traditional local dishes.

== Villages ==
Prior to its consolidation into Kankaanpää in 2021, Honkajoki consisted of the following villages:

- Antila, Honkajoki, (Note: Designated as a church village (kirkonkylä).) Katko, Lauhala, Paasto, Vataja, Pappila, Mämminmaa, Pukara, Perämaa, Jyllinkoski, Rynkäinen, Vahonkylä
