= Finnish Rapid Deployment Force =

- Active: 1996 - present
- Country: Finland
- Branch: Finnish Army Finnish Air Force Finnish Navy
- Role: International missions peacekeeping
- Size: Battle group
- Part of: Finnish Defence Forces International Centre
- Garrison/HQ: Pori Brigade, Säkylä, Finland
- Mottos: Näytä hyvältä, tee hyvää! (Finnish for "look good, do good!")
- Mascots: Crowned, golden lion
- Equipment: XA-300 APC, Raisu, RG-32M, XA-360

Commanders
- FDF International Centre Commander: Colonel Mauri Koskela

Insignia
- Uniform: Rapid Deployment Force arch
- Headdress: International Forces' beret

The Finnish Rapid Deployment Force (FRDF) (Finnish: Suomen Kansainvälinen Valmiusjoukko) is the spearhead international force of the Finnish Defence Forces (FDF). It can also be used for national defence.

The force is trained to participate as part of multinational peacekeeping and crisis management operations, and can be deployed at short notice.

Although the FRDF is an addition to rather than a replacement for traditional peacekeeping forces, many Finnish peacekeepers have FRDF training, and FRDF soldiers are mostly used as a recruitment pool for international peacekeeping missions, which may consist of a mix of normal reservists, FRDF-trained reservists and professional soldiers (mostly officers).

Formed in 1996, the first battalion became operational in 1998. Elements of the group were first deployed in 1999 as a part of the KFOR operation in Kosovo.

== Order of battle ==
The FRDF currently consists of:

- Mechanized jäger battalion (Jääkäripataljoona 101) equipped with Sisu Pasi APCs
- Combat engineer battalion (Pioneeripataljoona 102)
- CIMIC company
- Hämeenmaa class minelayer with complement from the Finnish Navy
- HQ officers
- Military observers
- Brigade-level communications and command system
- Six F-18C Hornet fighter aircraft and 200-300 personnel from the Finnish Air Force

== Conscript training ==
Only volunteer conscripts that have passed an entry test and have not yet finished their military service can apply for FRDF training. The test consist of basic physical, intelligence, psychological and English tests. These tests are the same that all FDF conscripts take before selection for NCO training, with the exception of an interview and English language test. As of 2002, all FRDF servicemen are trained to be at least NCOs. The requirements are considered to be nearly as high as those of Army and Navy special forces, such as the Para Jägers and Combat Divers.

About 25% of applicants are accepted every year. Applicants are typically young men (18–20 years old) who have already been assigned a place to complete their mandatory conscript service, but voluntarily want to apply for international training in addition to national defence training. Women can also be accepted, but typically make up less than 1% of trainees. Up to a few dozen servicemen fail to complete their training every year, usually because of poor suitability to the required NCO training, physical problems or general lack of motivation.

After training, servicemen can voluntarily sign a "readiness contract" for one year at a time. This obligates them to, if needed, participate in training for crisis management or peacekeeping operations during that year within a week's notice. In practice, the contract serves as an application for participating in a peacekeeping mission such as KFOR. Most servicemen who complete their training do sign this contract. FRDF-trained reservists are usually given top priority for places in international peacekeeping operations, although normal FDF reservists can apply.

The FRDF service itself does not differ radically from the standard Finnish conscript service. Still, there are key differences:

- All servicemen serve the maximum amount of conscript service time in the FDF, 347 days. The usual time for conscripts is 165 or 255 days.
- The first six months of training is basically the same as for all Finnish conscript NCOs or reserve officer candidates. After that, the NCO and reserve officer training is completed and is followed by a two-month special training period. Some servicemen are trained as medics and vehicle drivers during this period, while others are given special small arms and combat training. This period is followed by a short "group training" phase, a final combat exercise where the national defence training is tested. The conscript training is ended by a three-month international period during which the servicemen often live in base camps simulating those used in international missions. The servicemen train patrolling, checkpoint operation, cooperation with foreign forces, riot control, cordon & search etc.
- The training usually culminates in an international exercise. These exercises have been organized yearly in Lithuania (Amber Hope), Norway (Battle Griffin) and other countries. FRDF conscripts last participated in the NATO Partnership for Peace multinational exercise Amber Hope 2007.

The main FRDF training site is at Pori Brigade in Säkylä, Finland. The core units are trained there, the arms branches varying yearly, with some years placing emphasis on the training of combat engineers and others on infantry, etc.

Additionally, SEO (Suojelun Erikoisosasto) a CBRN warfare specialist formation is trained at irregular intervals of FRDF conscript batches.

== Amphibious Task Unit ==
Another training site is Nyland Brigade where the ATU, or Amphibious Task Unit, is trained. The force trained yearly there is about the equivalent of a Coastal jaeger platoon, or 40-50 servicemen. ATU servicemen differ from the Pori Brigade servicemen in that they have already served a part of their conscription service in the Nyland Brigade before applying. ATU applicants have basically the same admission tests as regular FRDF, except that applicants to the ATU also have to go through a swimming test. The units train separately.

The ATU is a joint project with the Swedish Armed Forces, the Swedish forces being trained at the 1st Marine Regiment, with joint exercises held regularly.

== Beret ==
The golden lion.

The FDF international forces' beret is the standard FDF ground forces' green beret, but instead of wearing a silver pin depicting a roaring lion, the international beret features a roaring golden lion wearing a crown.

Conscripts must earn the golden pin in a "beret mark test" or "beret march", which is an unusually long march/exercise. Upon successful completion, the golden lion is awarded. In UN operations, the standard UN blue beret is used, but in NATO-led operations such as KFOR and ISAF the FRDF beret is used (notably also by peacekeepers who have no conscript FRDF training).

ATU servicemen may wear the Navy or Coastal Jäger beret during conscript training, they do not receive the international beret.

== Sources ==
- The Pori Brigade in English
- Publications of the Finnish Defence Forces ("Englanniksi" = in English)
- FDF site for the exercise Amber Hope 2007
- ATU information
- The FRDF in Finnish
