= Kankaanpää =

- Town
- Kankaanpään kaupunki Kankaanpää stad
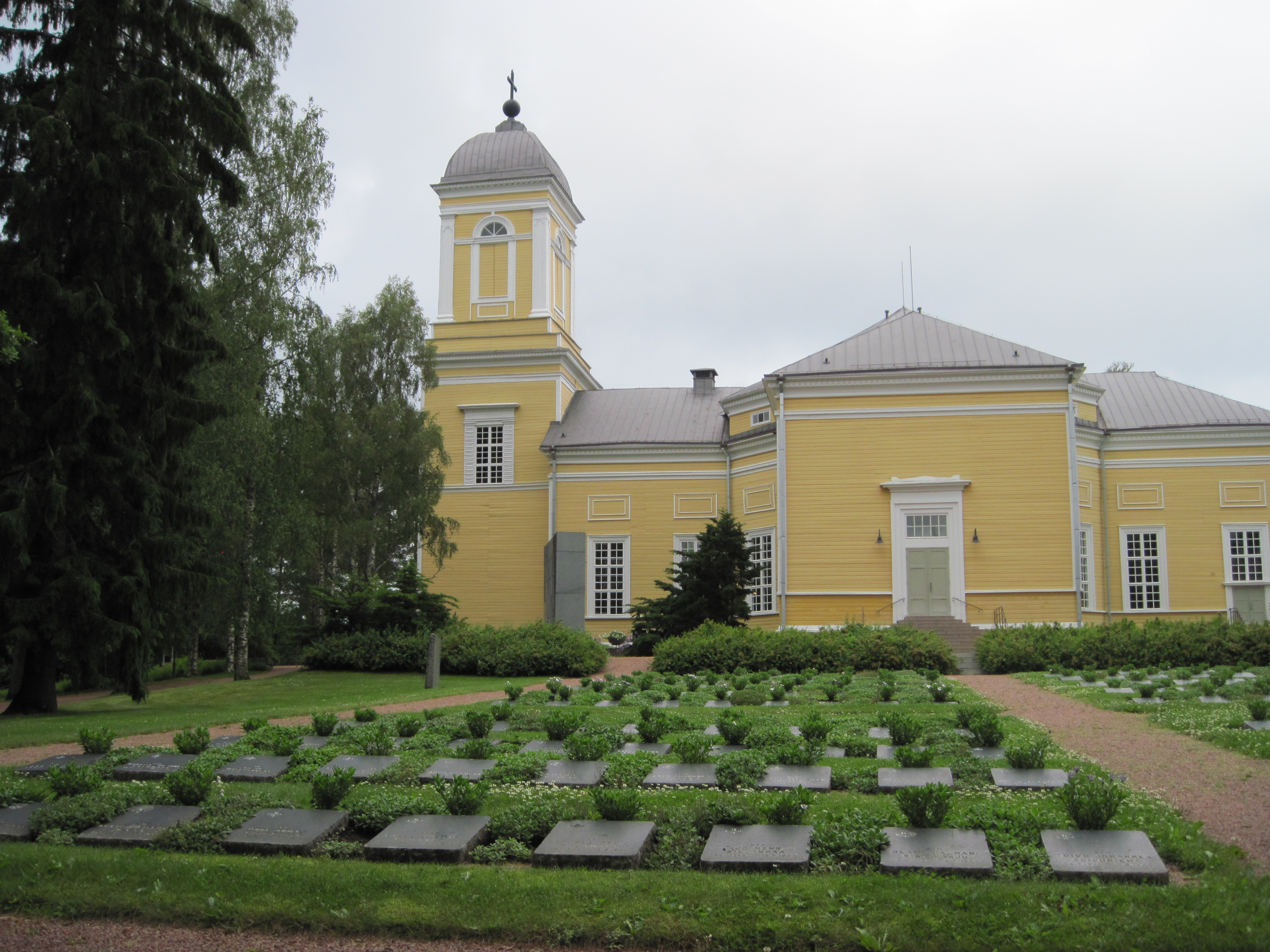
- Military cemetery at church in Kankaanpää

- Coat of arms

- Location of Kankaanpää in Finland
- Interactive map of Kankaanpää
- Coordinates: 61°48′N 022°24′E
- Country: Finland
- Region: Satakunta
- Sub-region: Northern Satakunta
- Charter: 1865
- Market town: 1967
- Town privileges: 1972

Government
  - Town manager: Mika Hatanpää

Area (2018-01-01)
  - Total: 704.73 km^{2} (272.10 sq mi)
  - Land: 1,021.25 km^{2} (394.31 sq mi)
  - Water: 15.37 km^{2} (5.93 sq mi)
  - Rank: 122nd largest in Finland

Population (2025-12-31)
  - Total: 12,508
  - Rank: 80th largest in Finland
  - Density: 12.25/km^{2} (31.7/sq mi)

Population by native language
  - Finnish: 91.6% (official)
  - Swedish: 0.1%
  - Others: 8.3%

Population by age
  - 0 to 14: 14.5%
  - 15 to 64: 57.4%
  - 65 or older: 28.2%
- Time zone: UTC+02:00 (EET)
  - Summer (DST): UTC+03:00 (EEST)
- Climate: Dfc
- Website: www.kankaanpaa.fi

Kankaanpää (Finnish pronunciation: [ˈkɑŋkɑːmˌpæː]) is a town and municipality of Finland. Kankaanpää was founded in 1865, became a township in 1967 and finally a town in 1972. It is located in the crossroads of Hämeenkangas and Pohjankangas ridges. It belongs to the region of Satakunta. Kankaanpää has a population of about 12,500 inhabitants, which makes it the third largest municipality in the Satakunta region in terms of population, after the city of Pori and the town of Rauma. Pori is located 53 kilometres (33 mi) southwest of Kankaanpää.

The coat of arms of Kankaanpää has its theme from the early days of the municipality's settlement, the origin of which is depicted with a golden pine tree in the middle of forest areas. The coat of arms was designed by Carolus Lindberg and was confirmed on 12 October 1951.

Honkajoki municipality was merged with Kankaanpää on 1 January 2021.

== History ==
First signs of humanity in the area are from the Stone Age and during the 16th century people started to settle in Kankaanpää area. Oldest houses that area found from the documents of Swedish Finland are from the 1560 decade. There were three houses in Kankaanpää then: Honko, Oukari and Päivike.

The oldest passage in the province was from Hämeenkyrö through the ridges to Kauhajoki. In the 17th century it was the most important road between southern Finland and Ostrobothnia. The king of Sweden visited Kankaanpää twice. Gustavus Adolphus travelled from Ilmajoki to Hämeenlinna through Kankaanpää in 1614 and Adolf Fredrik had a rest in Kuninkaanlähde spring to water his horses and to eat in 1752. The spring was named after this event.

The church of Kankaanpää has been built in 1839. Architect of the church was C. L. Engel.

== Climate ==
Based on the village of Niinisalo about 5.7 km northeast of the site the climate is a continental subarctic frontier (Köppen: Dfc) considering that the warmest fourth month is around 9 °C, which puts Kankaanpää in a humid continental climate (Dfb) being closer to Helsinki than Oulu, it also means that summer is more consistent and warm but winters are still cold. The municipality is considered one of the rainiest of Finland with 571 mm only during a growing season in 1995. Growing season starts in early May and lasts until October 10.

Climate data for Kankaanpää (Niinisalo), elevation: 136 m or 446 ft, 1991-2020 normals, extremes 1961-1990 and 1998-present
Month	Jan	Feb	Mar	Apr	May	Jun	Jul	Aug	Sep	Oct	Nov	Dec	Year
Record high °C (°F)	7.4 (45.3)	8.5 (47.3)	14.8 (58.6)	21.6 (70.9)	29.2 (84.6)	33.5 (92.3)	33.0 (91.4)	31.2 (88.2)	27.7 (81.9)	19.6 (67.3)	13.0 (55.4)	9.9 (49.8)	33.5 (92.3)
Mean daily maximum °C (°F)	−2.6 (27.3)	−2.6 (27.3)	1.7 (35.1)	8.3 (46.9)	15.1 (59.2)	19.3 (66.7)	21.9 (71.4)	20.1 (68.2)	14.4 (57.9)	7.3 (45.1)	2.2 (36.0)	−0.8 (30.6)	8.7 (47.6)
Daily mean °C (°F)	−5.4 (22.3)	−5.9 (21.4)	−2.3 (27.9)	3.3 (37.9)	9.5 (49.1)	14.0 (57.2)	16.8 (62.2)	15.2 (59.4)	10.1 (50.2)	4.3 (39.7)	0.0 (32.0)	−3.2 (26.2)	4.7 (40.5)
Mean daily minimum °C (°F)	−8.4 (16.9)	−9.2 (15.4)	−6.3 (20.7)	−1.2 (29.8)	3.9 (39.0)	8.6 (47.5)	11.9 (53.4)	10.7 (51.3)	6.4 (43.5)	1.5 (34.7)	−2.2 (28.0)	−5.8 (21.6)	0.8 (33.5)
Record low °C (°F)	−34.9 (−30.8)	−35.7 (−32.3)	−25.8 (−14.4)	−15.0 (5.0)	−8.3 (17.1)	−3.0 (26.6)	2.0 (35.6)	0.0 (32.0)	−5.4 (22.3)	−15.9 (3.4)	−23.8 (−10.8)	−33.0 (−27.4)	−35.7 (−32.3)
Average precipitation mm (inches)	50.0 (1.97)	39.0 (1.54)	35.0 (1.38)	32.0 (1.26)	41.0 (1.61)	72.0 (2.83)	84.0 (3.31)	68.0 (2.68)	66.0 (2.60)	72.0 (2.83)	60.0 (2.36)	56.0 (2.20)	675 (26.57)
Average precipitation days (≥ 1.0 mm)	11.0	9.0	9.0	7.0	7.0	10.0	10.0	10.0	9.0	11.0	11.0	12.0	116
Average relative humidity (%) (daily average)	91	89	81	71	64	68	73	78	84	89	93	93	81
Source 1: NOAA
Source 2: FMI

== Politics ==
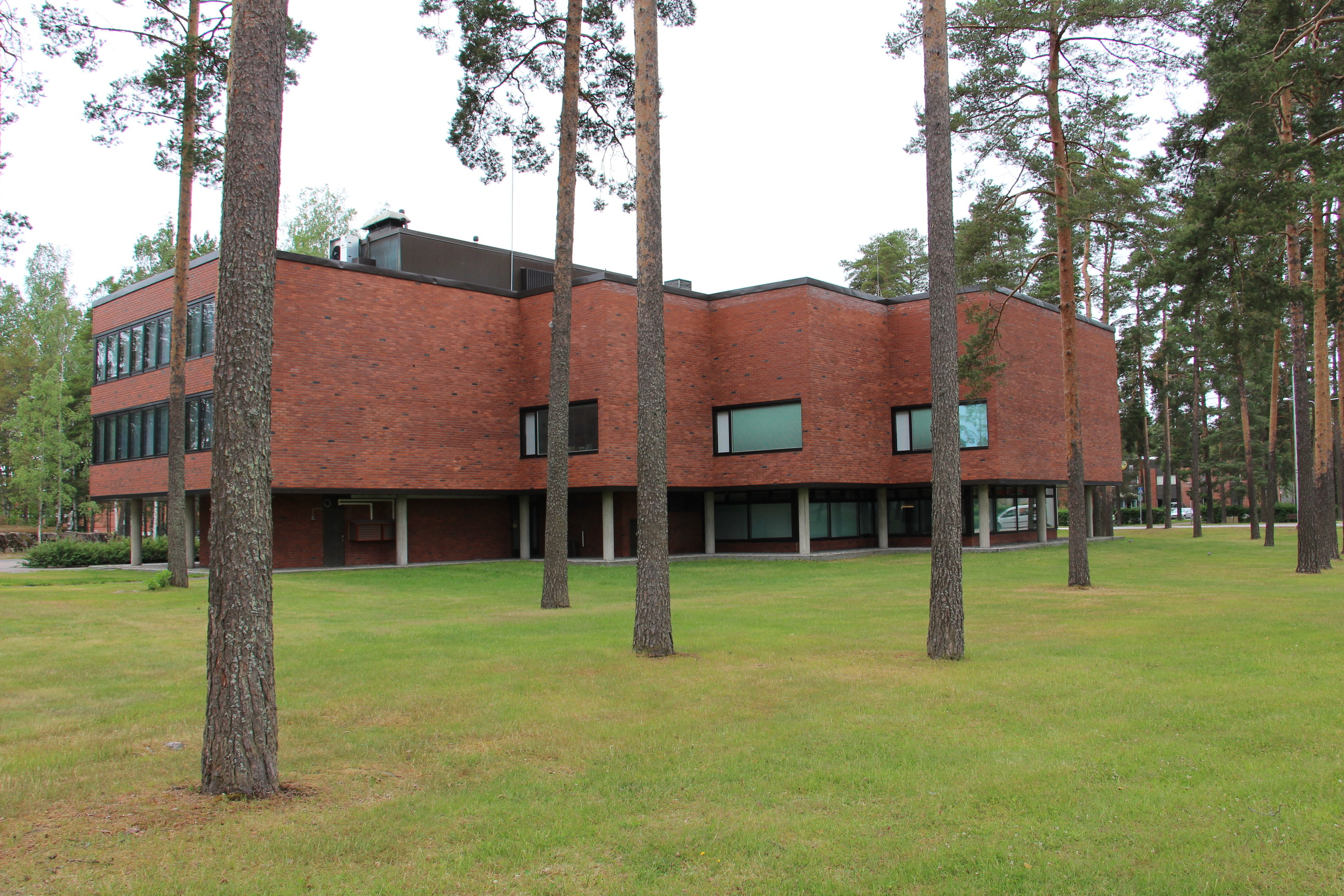
Kankaanpää Town Hall

Results of the 2011 Finnish parliamentary election in Kankaanpää:

- True Finns 37.2%
- Centre Party 25.5%
- National Coalition Party 11.8%
- Social Democratic Party 10.6%
- Left Alliance 7.7%
- Christian Democrats 4.4%
- Green League 2.4%

Results of the 2021 Finnish municipal elections, resulted in the True Finns being the largest group on the Kankaanpää council, in Kankaanpää.

== Villages ==
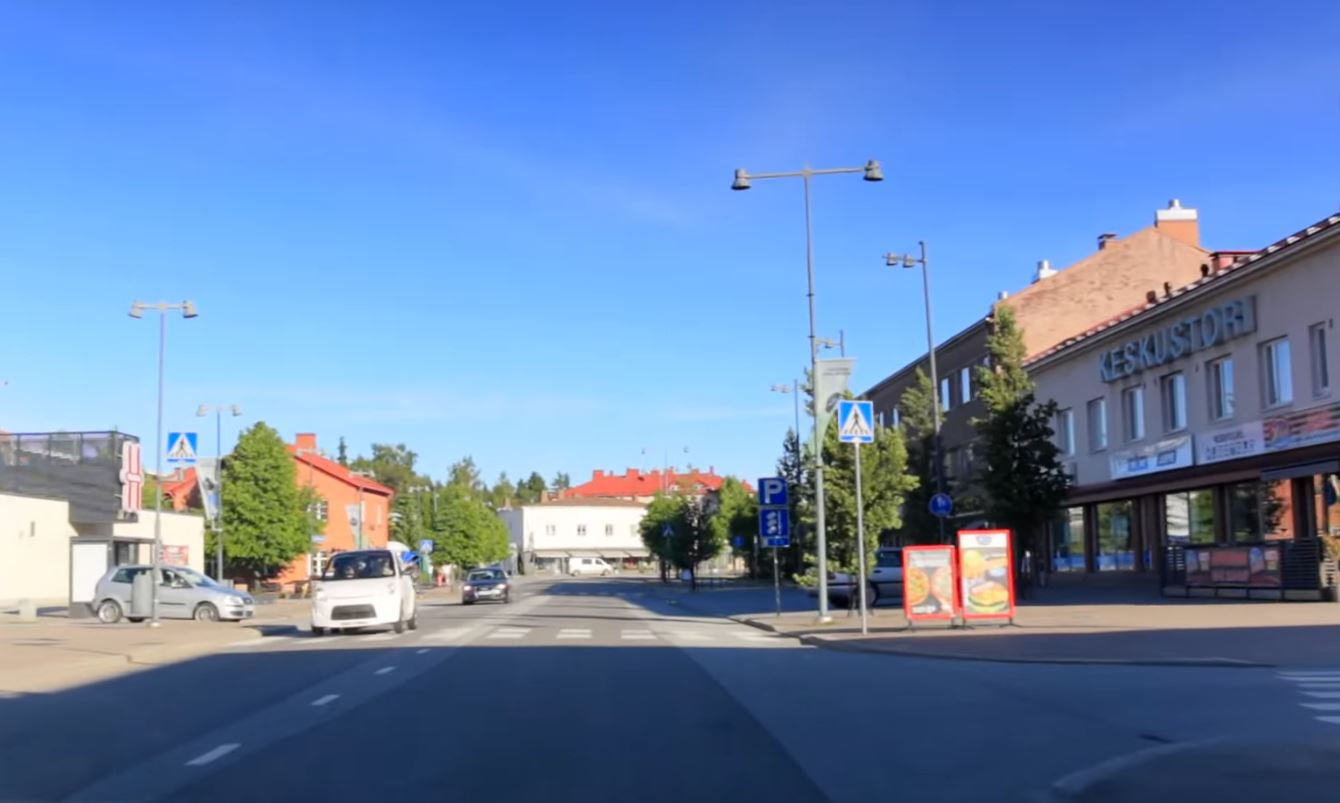
A town center of Kankaanpää

As of 2021, after the merger with the former town municipality of Honkajoki, Kankaanpää consists of the following populated places:

Kankaanpää proper sub-section

- urban: Justeeri, Jyllinmäki, Jyränkylä, Järventausta, Kirnukallio, Koskenoja, Käpylä, Kärki, Lohikko, Lorvikylä, Makkaramäki, Mettälänkangas, Myllymäki, Pansia, Reima, Tapala
- rural: Ala-Honkajoki, Hapua, Jyränkylä, Korvaluoma-Karhusaari, Kyynärjärvi, Narvi, Niinisalo, Santaskylä, Taulunoja, Venesjärvi, Veneskoski, Verttuu, Vihteljärvi

Honkajoki sub-section

- Antila, Honkajoki, (Note: Designated as a church village (kirkonkylä).) Katko, Lauhala, Paasto, Vataja, Pappila, Mämminmaa, Pukara, Perämaa, Jyllinkoski, Rynkäinen, Vahonkylä

== Education ==
Kankaanpää offers basic education with 6 elementary schools and a secondary school. There is also a trade school and a polytechnic school which will be abolished in near future. The Artillery School in the Artillery Brigade provides university-level education for all future career artillery officers.

== Culture ==
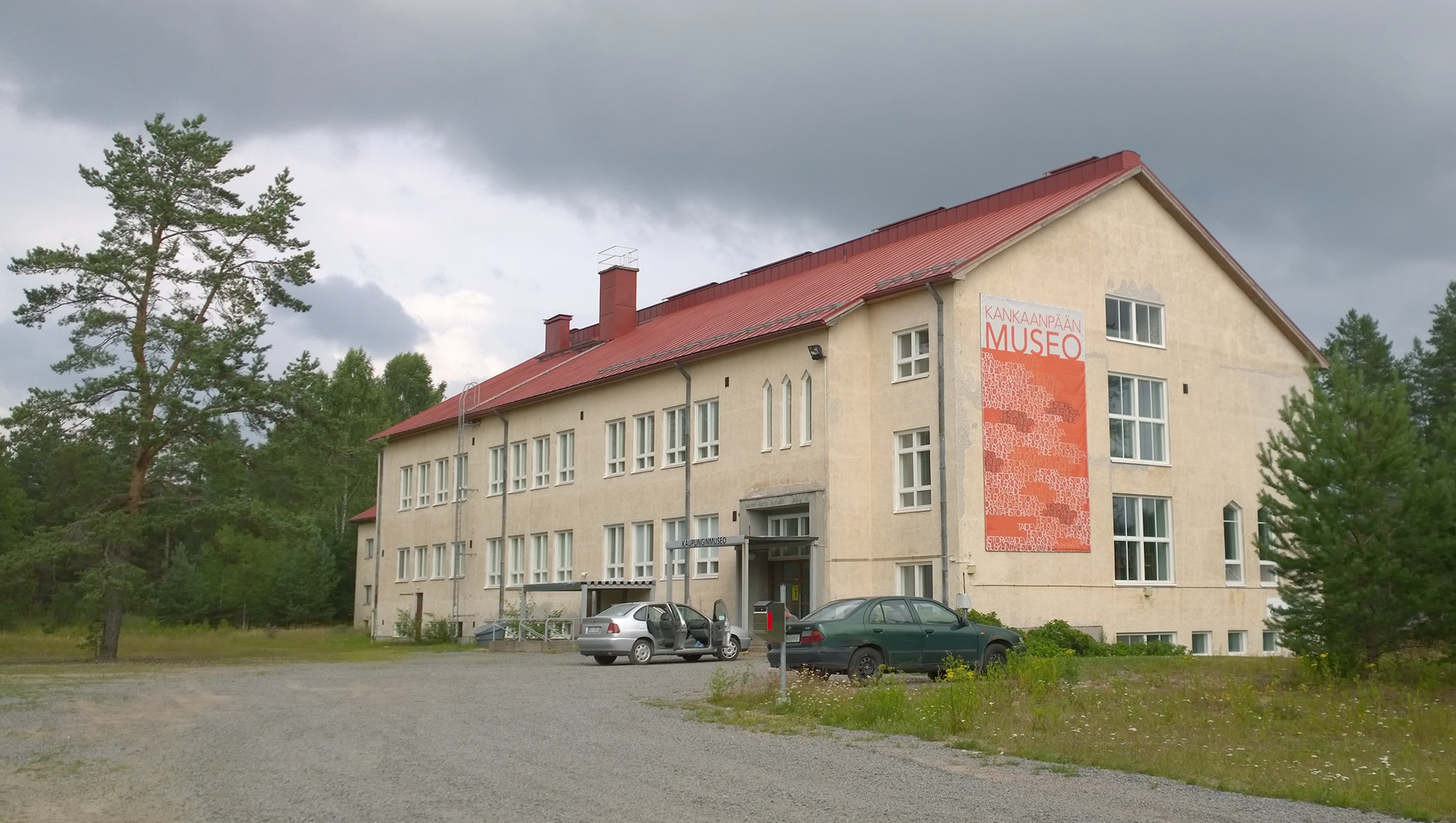
Kankaanpää Town Museum

Kankaanpää town museum showcases the life in Kankaanpää during the last 100 years. Kankaanpää is home to the visual arts unit of Satakunta University of Applied Sciences, also known as Kankaanpää Art School. The educational institution covers the art of the 1950s and 60s, when Kankaanpää was already a center of visual arts.

The local dialect of Kankaanpää is part of the Tavastian dialects.

=== Food ===
Due to its roots in Tavastia, the traditional drink of Kankaanpää is sahti, and the traditional food is ristavelli, which is a pea soup made with rye flour. In the 1980s, sheep meat and cooked potatoes were also named as other parish dishes.

== Military ==
The Pohjankangas Training Area is located nearby. It is the second largest training area of the Finnish Defence Forces.

== Notable people ==
- Cristal Snow, musician and drag queen
- Toni Vilander, racing driver
- Ristomatti Hakola, cross-country skier

== International relations ==
=== Twin towns — sister cities ===
Kankaanpää is twinned with:

- Bollnäs, Sweden
- Flekkefjord, Norway
- (Georgia (country)) Gagra, Georgia
- Misburg, Germany
- Morsø Municipality, Denmark

== See also ==
- Honkajoki
- Niinisalo
- Pori
