= Agreement on Defense Cooperation between the Czech Republic and the United States of America =

2023 agreement between the Czech Republic and the US

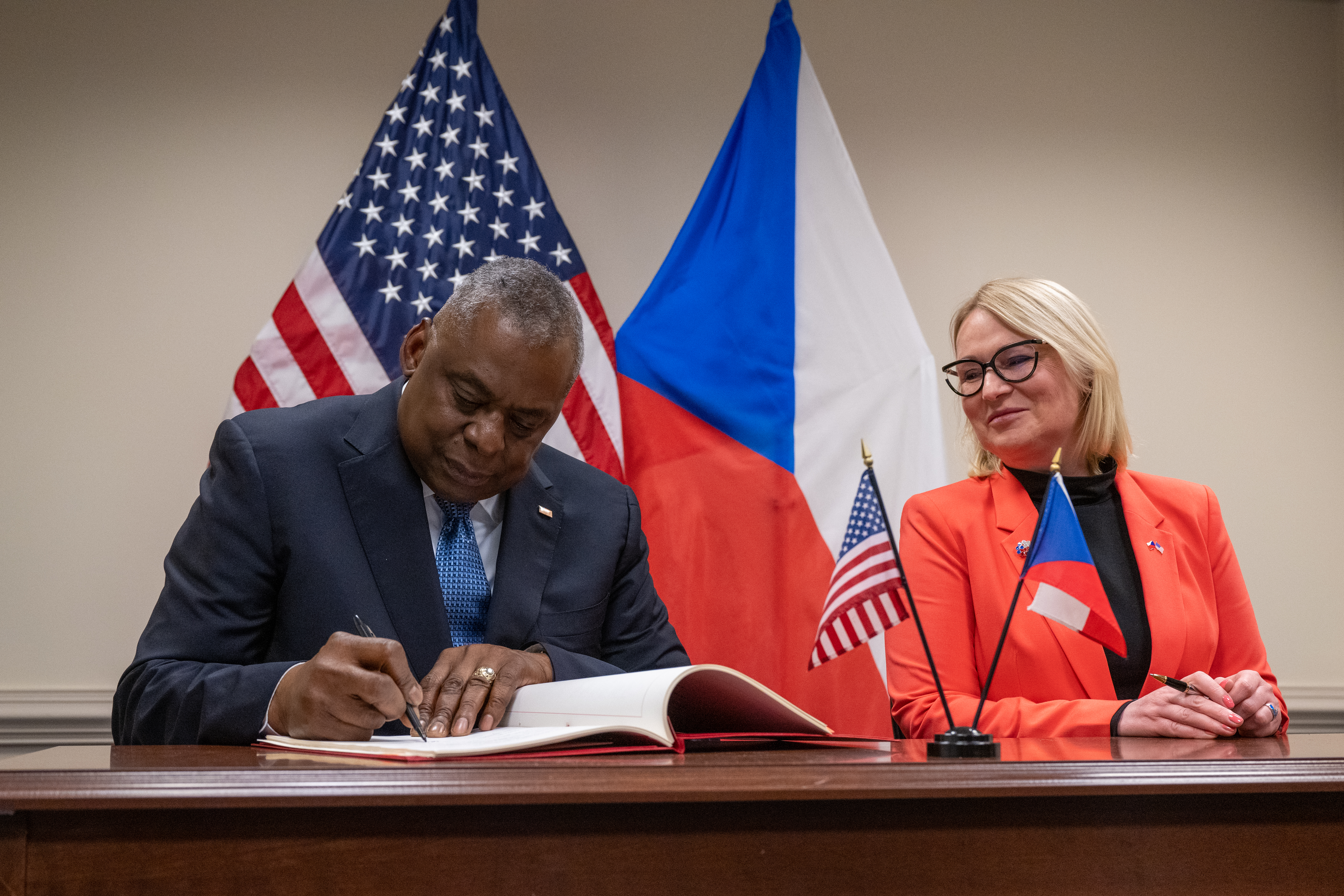
U.S. Secretary of Defense Lloyd Austin and Czech Republic Minister of Defense Jana Černochová sign the Defense Cooperation Agreement at the Pentagon, 23 May 2023.

The Defense Cooperation Agreement is an agreement between the Czech Republic and the United States approved by the government of the Czech Republic on April 26, 2023. The agreement was ratified by the Parliament of the Czech Republic, signed by the president Petr Pavel and entered into force on 22 September 2023.

The agreement regulates the presence of the US armed forces and their dependents on the territory of the Czech Republic, as well as the presence and activities of US suppliers on the territory of the Czech Republic.

This Agreement further develops and strengthens, among others:

a) cooperation between the parties in defense matters, both bilaterally and within NATO, b) a closer relationship in the field of interoperability, capability development, defense planning and military training of the parties in order to strengthen the joint defense effort, c) regular consultations regarding threats and challenges to international peace and security, including the fight against terrorism and d) exchange of information and experience in strategic matters of defense and security.

The agreement does not contain US commitments to the defense of the Czech Republic. The Czech Republic will take the necessary measures to ensure the protection of US armed forces and deployed material. For the purposes of maintaining or restoring order, ensuring the continuity of military operations, and protecting the US Armed Forces, US suppliers, Czech suppliers and dependents, the US Armed Forces are authorized to take measures necessary for the use, operation, defense or control of agreed facilities and premises by the US Armed Forces.

== Background ==
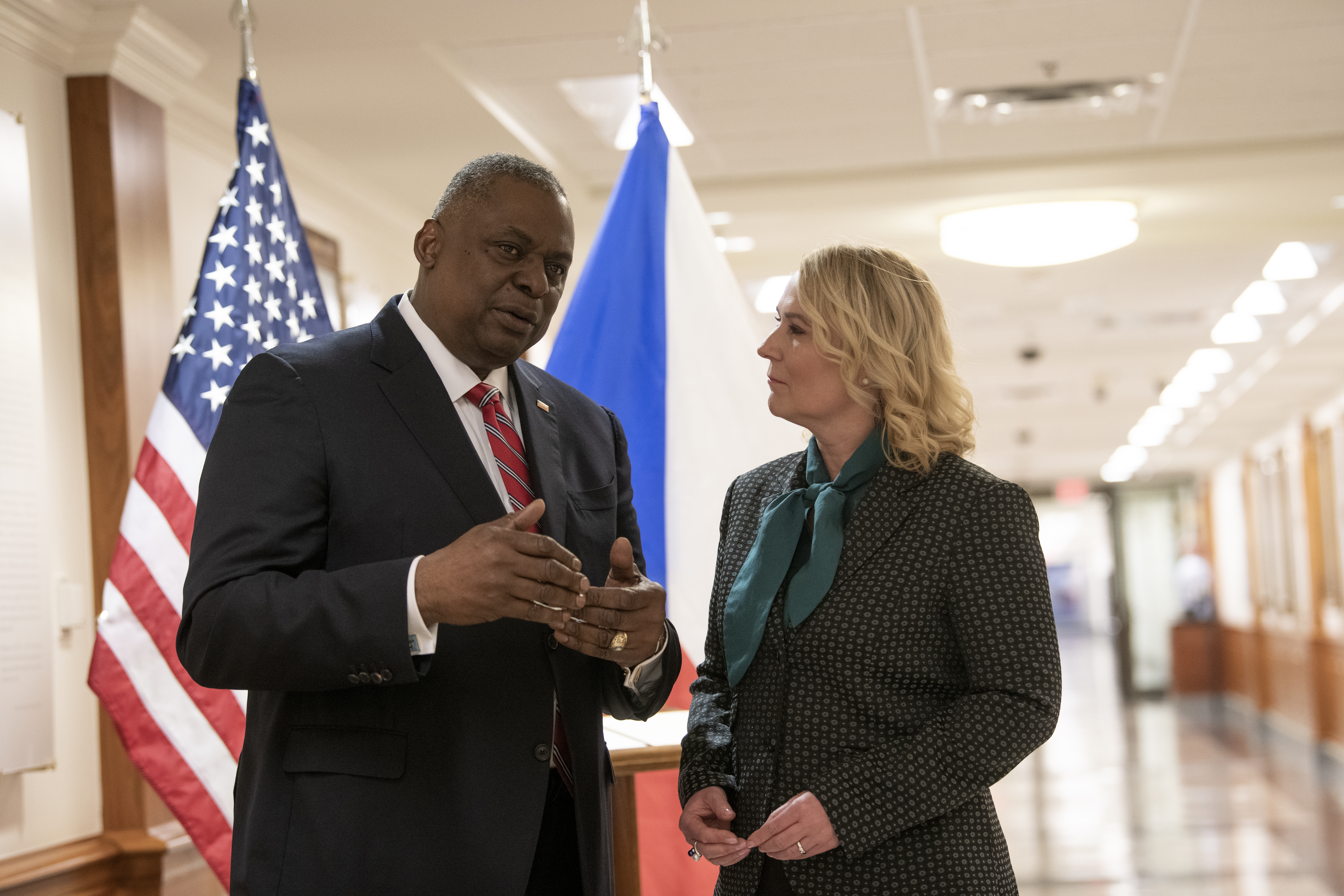
Lloyd Austin and Jana Černochová during a bilateral meeting, 21 April 2022

The start of negotiations on the DCA agreement was announced by the Minister of Defense Jana Černochová on April 21, 2022. The Czech negotiating team was led by Jan Jireš, senior director of the Defense Policy and Strategy Section. There were four rounds of negotiations with the USA. The Ministry of Defense, the Ministry of Finance, the Ministry of Justice, the Ministry of Foreign Affairs, the Ministry of Transport, the Ministry of Labor and Social Affairs, the Ministry of the Interior and the Supreme State Attorney's Office participated in the discussion of the agreement in secret mode.

The agreement was published and approved by the government of the Czech Republic on April 26, 2023.

The agreement was signed in Washington by Defense Minister Jana Černochová with her American counterpart Lloyd Austin on May 23, 2023.

This is the highest so-called presidential agreement. The agreement was ratified by the Chamber of Deputies, the Senate, and signed by the president of the Czech Republic Petr Pavel on 1 August 2023 and by the prime minister of the Czech Republic Petr Fiala on 16 August 2023.

== Content ==
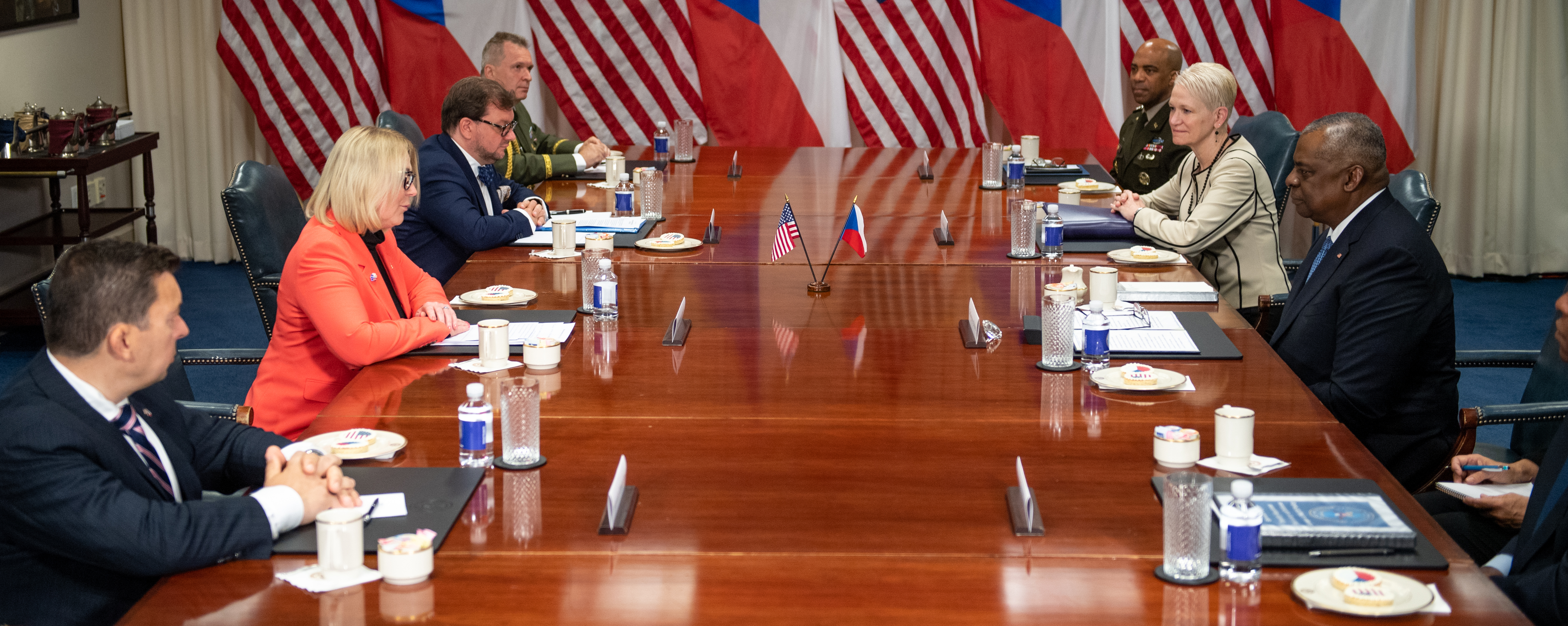
Lloyd Austin and Jana Černochová during a bilateral exchange meeting at the Pentagon, 23 May 2023.

The Agreement defines "Agreed Facilities and Premises" provided by the Czech Republic under the terms of this Agreement to the US Armed Forces, US suppliers, Czech suppliers, dependents and other persons as mutually agreed.

The Czech Republic will provide the agreed facilities and premises without rent or similar costs for the US armed forces.

The agreement gives the US Armed Forces, US suppliers, Czech suppliers and dependents the right to unimpeded access and use of the above agreed facilities and premises for the purpose of visits; training; exercises; maneuvers; passage; supporting and related activities; aircraft refueling; refueling of vessels; landing, interception or towing of aircraft; temporary maintenance of vehicles, vessels and aircraft; staff accommodation; connection; assembly and deployment of armed forces and materiel; placement of equipment, supplies and materials; security support and cooperation activities; joint and joint training activities; activities in the field of humanitarian aid or elimination of the consequences of disasters; crisis management; construction in support of mutually agreed activities; and for other purposes that are fulfilled within the framework of the North Atlantic Treaty.

The Czech Republic and the USA will use the agreed facilities and premises jointly and will have joint access to them, with the exception of those agreed facilities and premises or their parts that have been specifically designated by the executive authorities for exclusive access and use by the US armed forces.

At the request of the US Armed Forces, the Czech executive authorities are to facilitate the temporary access and use of all private and public lands and facilities (including roads, ports, and airports) to the US Armed Forces, US suppliers, and Czech suppliers for use in support of the Armed Forces USA. The US Armed Forces, US suppliers, and Czech suppliers will not bear the cost of such assistance.

The U.S. Armed Forces may transport, place, and store defense equipment, supplies, and material at agreed upon facilities and areas and other locations as mutually agreed.

Material of the US Armed Forces, as well as facilities or parts thereof intended for the storage of such material, shall be used exclusively by the Armed Forces of the US, unless otherwise mutually agreed. The U.S. Armed Forces will have exclusive control over access, use, and disposal of such emplaced material and shall have the unrestricted right to remove such emplaced material from the territory of the Czech Republic at any time. Storage locations may also be outside the spaces listed above.

Members of the US armed forces, dependents and US contractors are not subject to Czech legislation governing the registration and control of foreigners.

Aircraft, vessels and vehicles operated by or exclusively for the US armed forces may freely enter, move within and leave the territory of the Czech Republic. Such aircraft, vessels, and vehicles shall not be entered or searched without the consent of the United States.

The agreement is negotiated for an initial validity period of 10 years. After the initial term, the agreement will remain in effect but may be terminated by either party upon one year's written notice.

== See also ==
- Agreement on Defense Cooperation between Finland and the United States of America
- Czech Republic–United States relations
