= Froebel star =

Christmas decoration made from paper

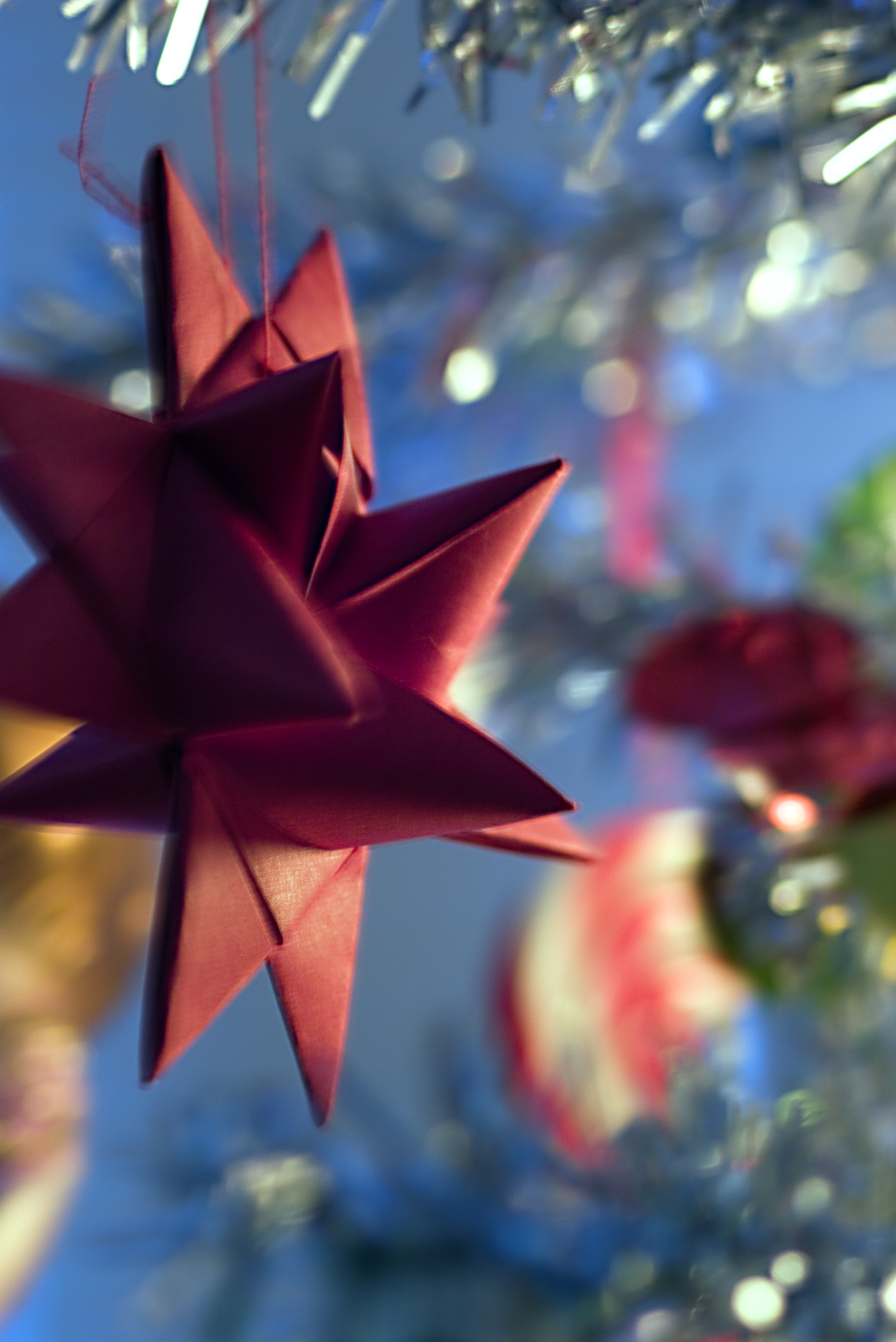
Froebel stars as part of Christmas decoration

A Froebel star (German: Fröbelstern) is a Christmas decoration made of paper, common in Germany. In English it does not have a commonly recognised name; it can be referred to as an Advent star, Danish star, German star, Nordic star, Pennsylvanian star, Polish star, Swedish star, Christmas star, or Froebel star. It is also sometimes called a Moravian star, though the Moravian star is a general category of geometrical shapes and the sixteen tipped piece of origami is specifically called the Froebel star.

== Description ==
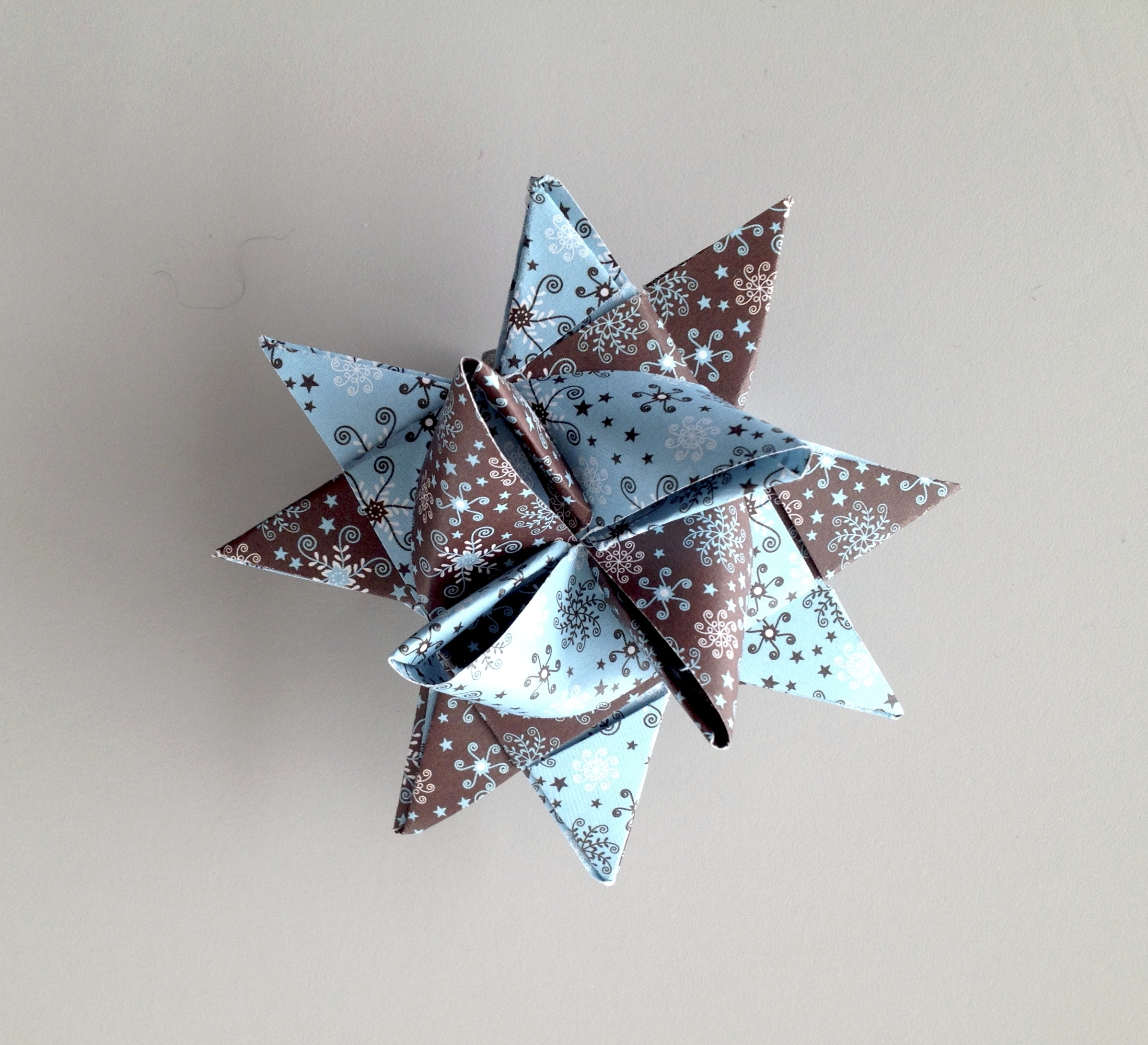
A Froebel star

The three-dimensional Froebel star is assembled from four identical paper strips with a width-to-length proportion of between 1:25 and 1:30. The weaving and folding procedure can be accomplished in about forty steps. The product is a paper star with eight flat prongs and eight cone-shaped tips. The assembly instructions can be aborted midway, producing a two-dimensional eight–pronged star without cones.

Crafting Froebel stars originates in German folklore. Traditionally the stars would be dipped into wax and sprinkled with glitter after being folded. The star can be considered a form of origami, because it is made of identical paper sheets and assembled without glue. However, as it combines folding with weaving it is more a "fringe" subject of origami.

== History ==
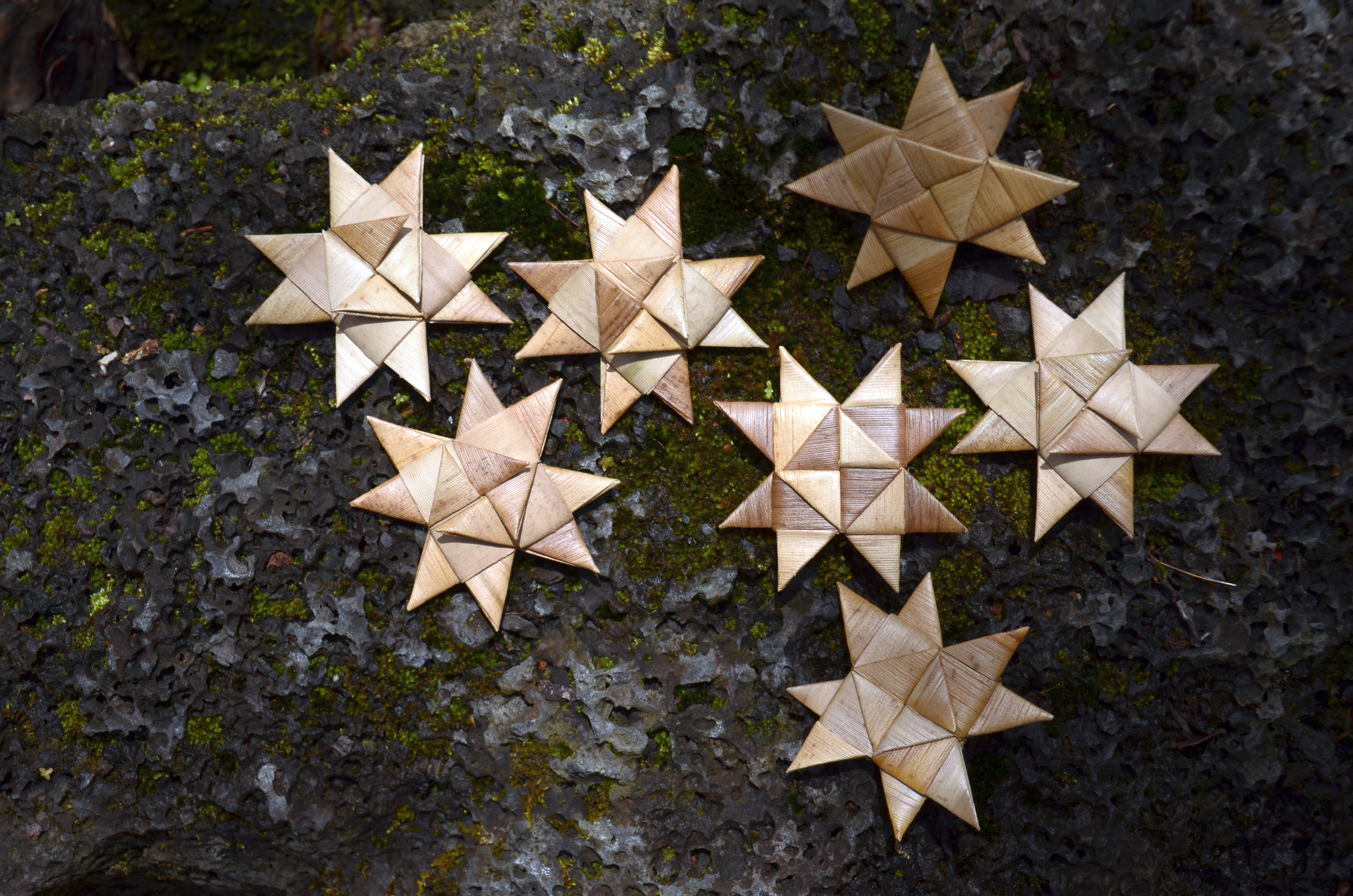
Froebel stars made from lauhala in Puna, Hawaiʻi

The Froebel star carries the name of the German educationist Friedrich Fröbel (1782–1852), founder of the Kindergarten concept. He encouraged the use of paper folding in pre-primary education with the aim of conveying simple mathematical concepts to children. It is, however, likely that Froebel did not invent this item and that it had already been within the realm of general knowledge for a long time. Froebel did encourage paper folding as an activity for young children and he popularised discourse about children's activities, which is how his name and the folding instructions might have become related.

Descriptions of how to fold a Froebel star date back to at least the 19th century. In Germany the name Fröbelstern has been the common name for this paper decoration since the 1960s. It is used as an ornament on Christmas trees and wreaths, and to make garlands and mobiles. Froebel stars are very common in Germany, although few people know how to make them.
