= Pori Brigade =

Unit of the Finnish Army

- Porin prikaati
- Insignia of the Pori Brigade.
- Active: 16 February 1626–1809: Björneborgs Regemente (Pori Regiment) Swedish Army; 1881–1901: Suomen 2. tarkk'ampujapataljoona (2nd Sharpshooter Battalion of Finland); 1918–1939: Porin rykmentti (Pori Regiment); 1939-1940: I/1. Pr (1st Battalion of the 1st Brigade); 1946–1957: Jalkaväkirykmentti 6 (Infantry Regiment 6); 1957–: Porin Prikaati (Pori Brigade)
- Country: Finland
- Branch: Finnish Army
- Type: Combined arms
- Role: Finnish Army Readiness Brigade; International operations of Finnish Army
- Mottos: Kunnia, velvollisuus, tahto (Honor, duty, will)
- Flag
- March: Uudenmaan Tarkk'ampujapataljoonan kunniamarssi
- Mascot: Crowned bear wielding a sword
- Equipment: Sisu Pasi, Patria AMV Sisu E11, RK 95 TP, MRLS, 155K98
- Decorations: Ribbon of Order of the Cross of Liberty as a streamer, with text "Satakunta, Pori".
- Battle honours: Thirty Years' War: Battle of Lützen; Great Northern War: Battle of Narva; Battle of Poltava; Finnish War Finnish Civil War: Satakunta front; Winter War: Battle of Summa; Continuation War: Karelian Isthmus 1944; inter alia

Commanders
- Current commander: Brigadier general Vesa Valtonen

The Pori Brigade (Finnish: Porin prikaati; Swedish: Björneborgs brigad), based in Huovinrinne, Säkylä and Niinisalo, Kankaanpää is a Finnish Army unit directly under the command of Army headquarters. It comprises six battalion-level units and also trains soldiers for the Finnish Rapid Deployment Force.

== History ==
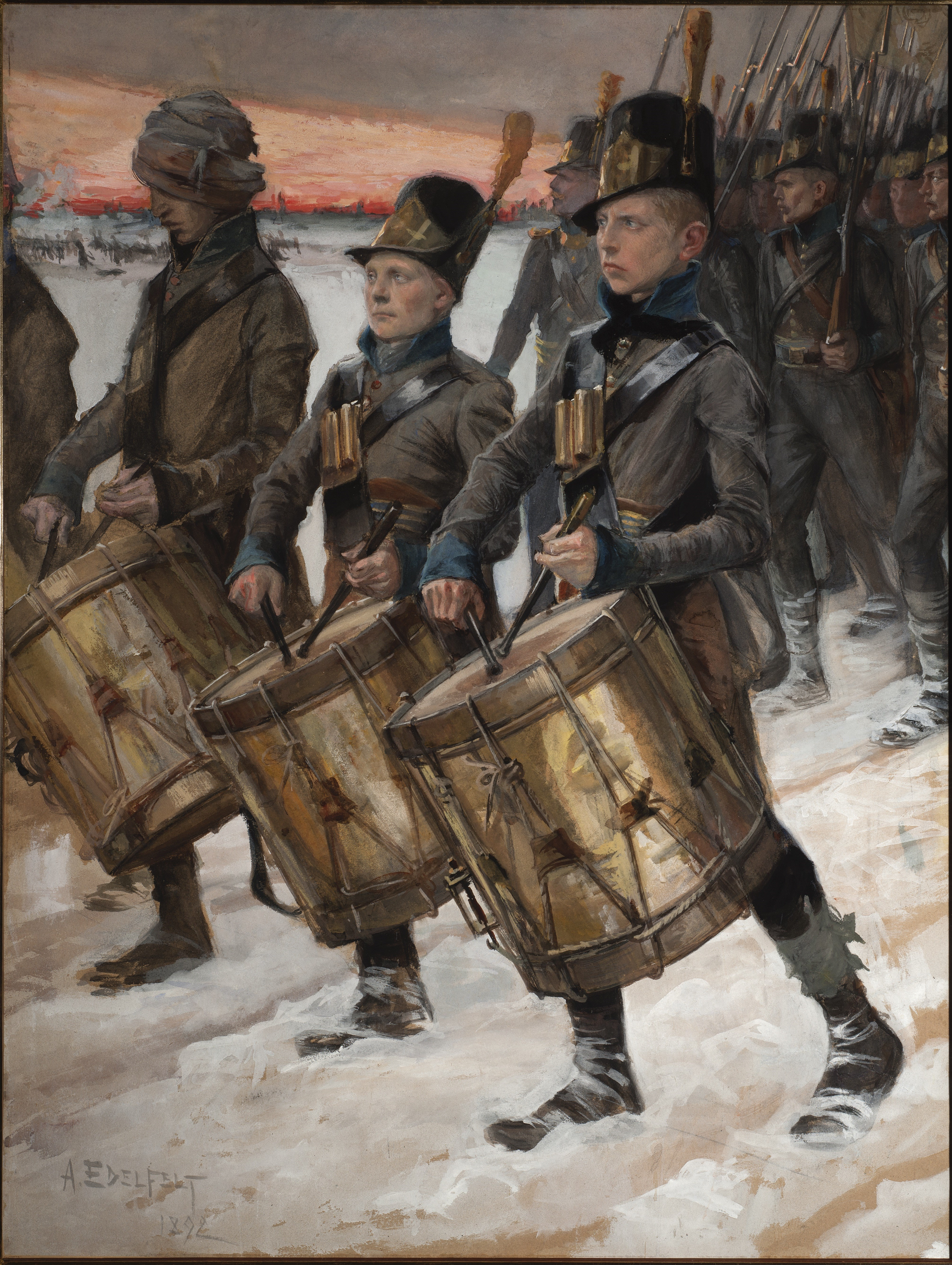
An illustration of the Björneborger Regiment marching during the Finnish War

The Pori Brigade's traditions date back to the 17th century. On 16 February 1626, King Gustav II Adolf of Sweden founded the Royal Pori Regiment during the Thirty Years' War. The regiment served in most wars of the Great Power era of Sweden, and was destroyed and reformed several times during the Great Northern War.

The regiment fought first as a part of the 1st Brigade and later as a part of the 2nd Brigade during the Finnish War and was effectively destroyed during the winter of 1809 as a result of casualties, disease and hunger. The remainder of the unit was disbanded when the Swedish army of Finland surrendered at Kalix River However, in 1855, when conscription based on the allotment system was reintroduced, also the allotments of Pori Regiment founded a conscripted sharpshooter battalion which was disbanded with other allotment system battalions in 1868. The introduction of conscription in 1878 lead to the founding of the 2nd Finnish Sharpshooter Battalion, which is included in the lineage of the brigade. The battalion, which never saw combat, was disbanded in 1901 as a part of the Russification measures of the Russian Imperial Government.

During the Finnish Civil War in 1918, the Pori Regiment fought on the South-western front and was garrisoned in Turku after the war. Its men took successfully part in the Winter War and the Continuation War while serving in a number of regiments. Infantry Regiment 6 became the peace-time unit garrisoned in Turku after the general demobilisation following the Continuation War. When Finnish Army units were given provincial names in 1957, the unit received its present name, Pori Brigade. As the city of Turku grew, the garrison became an impractical location for an infantry-training unit. Thus, the Brigade was moved to a new garrison in Säkylä, with 4,000 hectares of land for training and firing range purposes.

The brigade was greatly enlarged by the merger of the Artillery Brigade into the Pori Brigade in 2015. At present, the unit has two main training areas: Huovinrinne at Säkylä and Pohjankangas-Hämeenkangas (10,500 ha of live-fire area, 5,000 ha of exercise area) in Niinisalo.

== Organization ==
This chapter is based on and its subpages which contain the official public description of the Brigade's organisation. The Brigade operates in the Huovinrinne garrison in Säkylä and Niinisalo garrison in Kankaanpää

- Brigade Headquarters in Säkylä, with two regional offices responsible for conscription and local defence
  - South-Western Finland regional office in Turku, responsible for Satakunta and Finland Proper
  - Ostrobothnia regional office in Vaasa, responsible for regions of Ostrobothnia, Southern Ostrobothnia and Central Ostrobothnia
- Satakunta Jäger Battalion (SatJP) in Säkylä
  - 1st Jäger Company
  - 2nd Jäger Company
  - Antitank Company
  - Military Police Company
- Satakunta Engineer and Signals Battalion in Säkylä
  - Signals Company
  - HQ Company
  - 1st Engineer Company
  - NBC Company
- Satakunta Artillery Regiment at Niinisalo, formerly part of the Artillery Brigade
  - 1st Artillery Battery
  - 2nd Artillery Battery
  - Multiple Rocket Launcher System Battery
  - Mortar Company
- Ostrobothnia Jäger Battalion at Niinisalo
  - 3rd Jäger Company
  - Reconnaissance Company
  - UAV Reconnaissance Battery
  - Detachment for Reconnaissance, Surveillance and Targeting Support
- Finland Proper Logistics Battalion
  - Headquarters
  - 1st Logistics Company at Säkylä
  - 2nd Logistics Company at Niinisalo
  - Niinisalo Small Animals Clinic
  - Other logistics establishments
- Crisis Management Center

The Satakunta Jäger Battalion trains Jäger, or mechanized infantry companies, primarily equipped with Pasi (XA-185, -202 and -203 variants) and AMV armored personnel carriers. It also trains anti-tank troops and company-level specialists such as combat medics.

The Satakunta Engineer and Signals Battalion consists of four companies. The 1st Engineer Company produces wartime engineer troops, some of whom are assigned to bridging units. Mechanics are trained during the summer season to maintain and repair outboard motors. Some of the engineers are trained to operate landing craft or to handle pontoon and crossing equipment. Engineers construct and dismantle mobile bridges, build bridges and other structures and perform blasting and ground-breaking operations. The NBC Company has national responsibility for training CBRN protection troops for the Finnish Army, Navy and Air Force, providing supplementary training for career personnel and conducting R&D. The HQ and Signals companies train signals and headquarters troops and military police troops.

The Satakunta Artillery Regiment in Niinisalo trains artillery troops, with training for all artillery subfields including weather and geodetic services. The training equipment includes the artillery pieces, mortars and rocket launcher systems in Finnish service, such as the 155K98 cannon, AMOS mortar system and MRLS.

The Ostrobothnia Jaeger Battalion in Niinisalo trains infantry companies, reconnaissance troops, artillery forward observers and military working dog handlers.

The Finland Proper Logistics Battalion includes the logistics establishments in Säkylä and Niinisalo. The conscript units train logistics units and military drivers for crisis time needs. The Niinisalo small animals clinic has national responsibility for the veterinary care of Finnish Defence Forces service dogs.

The Crisis Management Centre is responsible for training and deploying all Finnish Army units in international duties. When a new operation is established, the Centre founds the Finnish contingent and trains it for the operation. For existing operations, the Centre trains new personnel rotations and takes care of domestic human resources management. When the Finnish Army has a standing active EU Battlegroup contingent, the Centre is responsible for it.

The Pori Brigade regularly hosts foreign officials and officers for demonstrations and has a long history of joint training with NATO and other forces.

Colours of the battalion-level units
Satakunta Jaeger Battalion

Satakunta Engineer and Signal Battalion

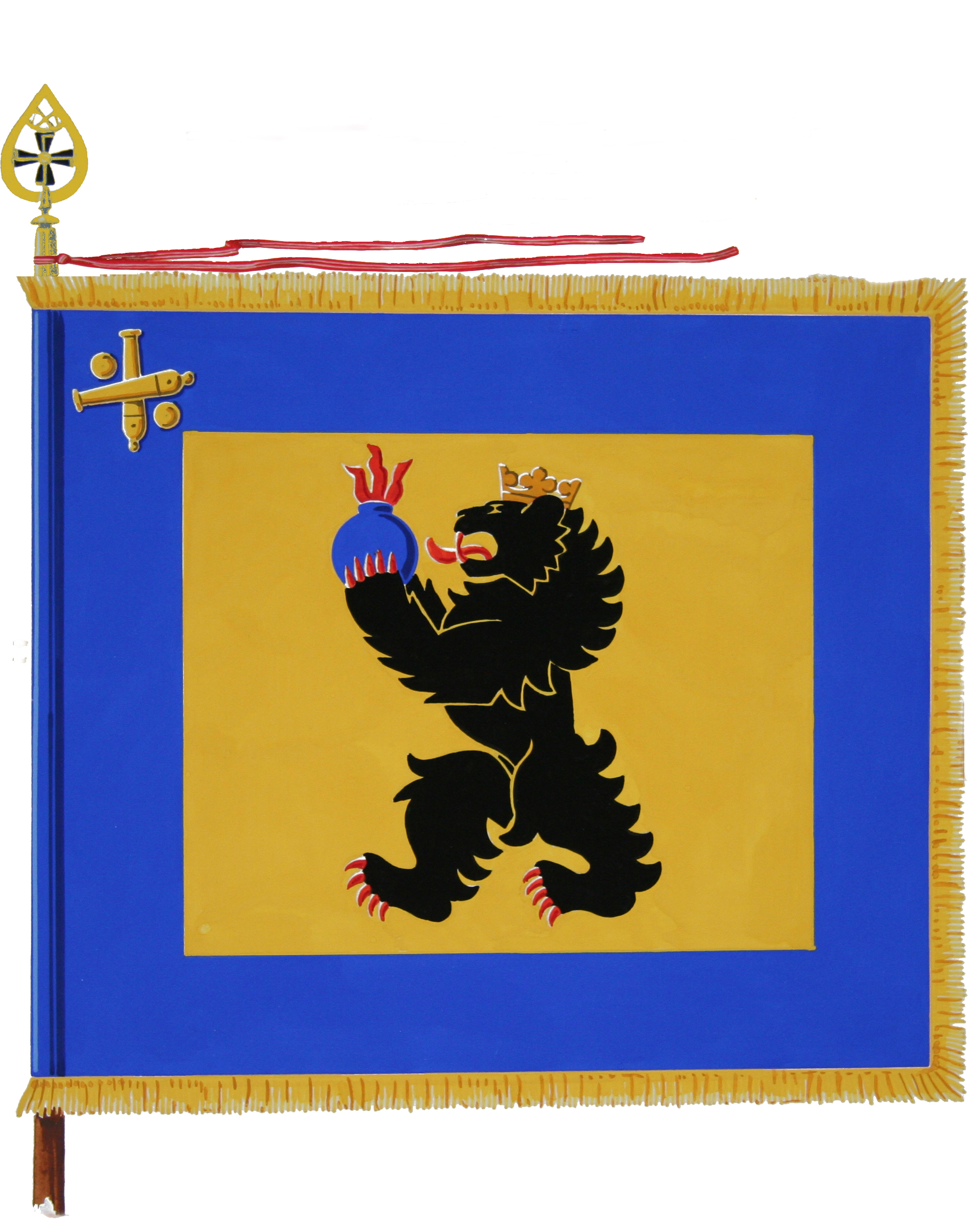
Satakunta Artillery Regiment

Ostrobothnia Jaeger Battalion

Finland Proper Logistics Battalion
