= Misi, Rovaniemi =

Village in Rovaniemi, Finland

Misi
- Village
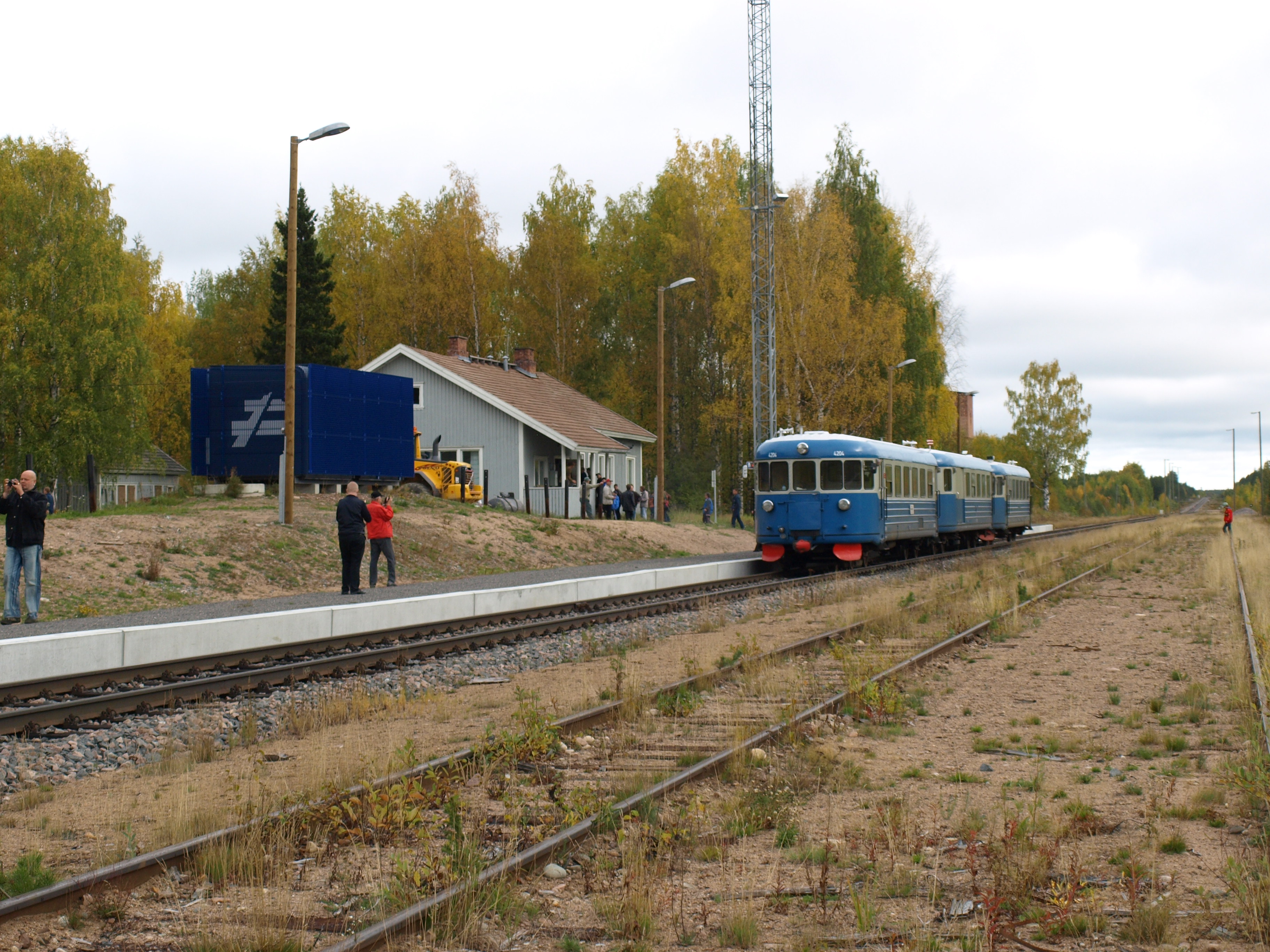
- Misi railway station in 2009.

- Location in Finland Misi (Lapland)
- Coordinates: 66°37′10″N 26°41′06″E
- Country: Finland
- Region: Lapland
- Municipality: Rovaniemi
- Time zone: UTC+2 (EET)
  - Summer (DST): UTC+3 (EEST)
- Postal code: 97580

Misi is a village in the Rovaniemi municipality in Lapland, Finland. It is located south of the Finnish Defence Forces' practice range Rovajärvi along the Kemi–Kelloselkä railway, approximately 50 kilometres (31 mi) east of Rovaniemi towards Kemijärvi. The village is home to the Misi railway station, around which the settlement is concentrated. In 2010, the village had 75 inhabitants.

In 2026, the Ministry of Transport and Communications announced that it had allocated a total of €107 million to the Rail Nordica project, aiming to establish a railway connection compliant with the European 1,435 mm (4 ft 8 1/2 in) standard gauge from the Swedish border to Northern Finland; the plan involves extending the track designs from the western border to Oulu and as far as the Misi village.
