= Niinisalo =

Village in Kankaanpää, Finland

Coordinates: 61.83912°N 22.467277°E

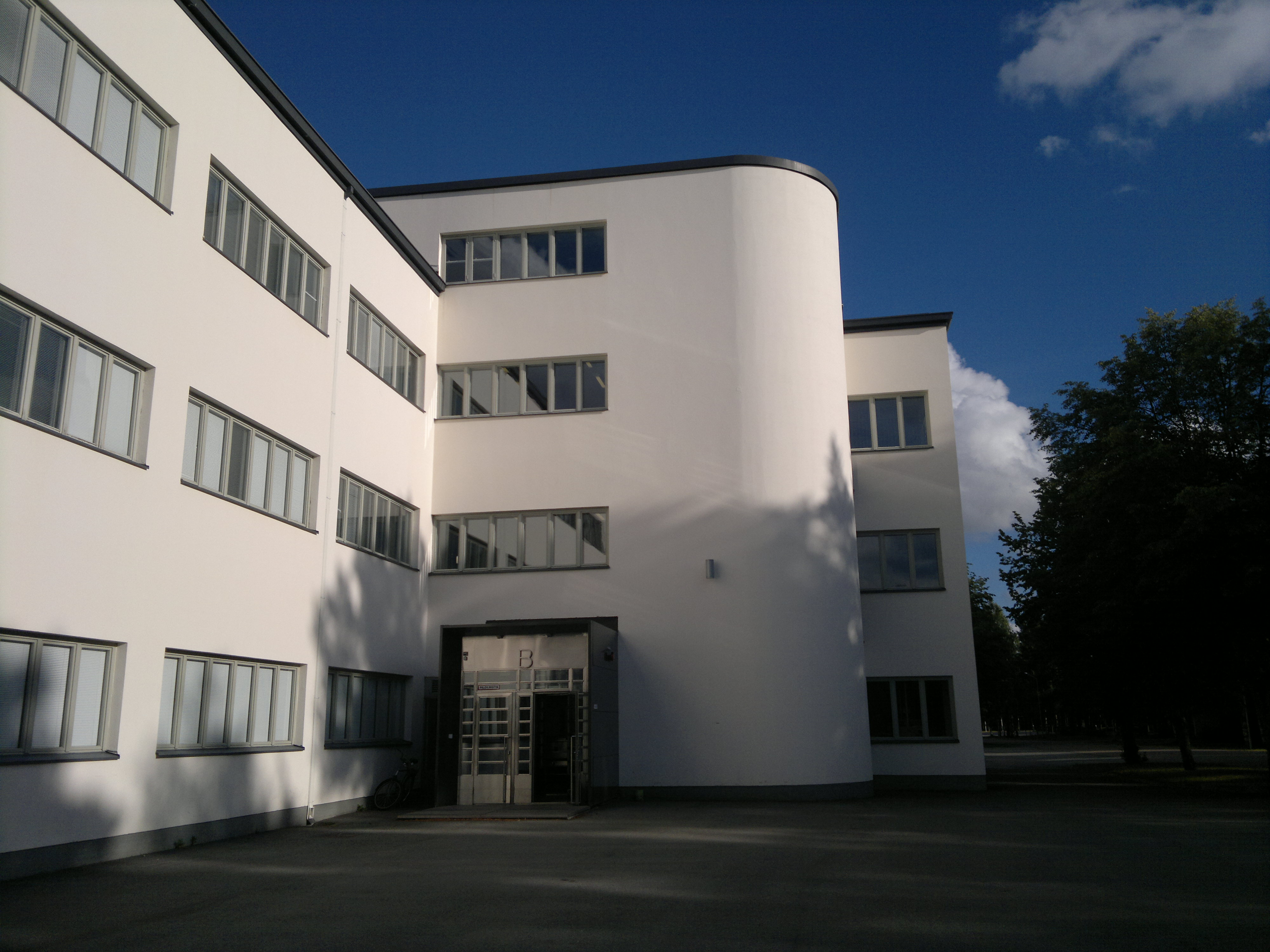
Main ("lamello") barracks of the Niinisalo Garrison

Niinisalo is a village in the municipality of Kankaanpää in the region of Satakunta in Finland. It is known for the Niinisalo Garrison which is the base of the Finnish Army unit Artillery Brigade. The population of Niinisalo is 996 (2009).

The Kankaanpää Museum is located in Niinisalo. From 1977 to 1997 Niinisalo was the home of the Artillery Museum of Finland. Niinisalo railway station was designed by architect Thure Hellström in 1933 but the Pori–Haapamäki railway was closed in the 1980s.

== Niinisalo Garrison ==
The Niinisalo Garrison was established in 1935. Since 1947 it has been the home of a field artillery unit. At the beginning of 2015, the brigade was merged with the Pori Brigade. The United Nations Training Centre was organized in Niinisalo in 1969. It was a unit for training Finnish peacekeepers as well as international courses for United Nations military observers. Since 2001 the UN Training Centre has been known as the Finnish Defence Forces International Centre FINCENT. It was transferred to Hyrylä in 2008, while international training was transferred to Pori Brigade in Säkylä.

The functionalist-style main barracks were designed by architect Kalle Lehtovuori and completed in 1935. The officers' housing area is mainly composed of buildings originally designed by Norwegian architect Olav Selvaag in the post-World War II years. The garrison and its residential areas have been declared cultural environments of national significance by the Finnish National Board of Antiquities.

In May 2022, Niinisalo hosted the international Arrow 22 exercise including Finnish troops and NATO troops from United States, United Kingdom, Estonia and Latvia.

=== Military units in the Niinisalo Garrison ===
- Reserve Officer School 1939–1945
- Field Artillery Regiment 1 1947–1952 / Field Artillery Regiment 2 1952–1956 / Satakunta Artillery Regiment 1957–1992 / Artillery Brigade 1992–2014
- Satakunta Military Band 1951–2013
- Veterinary School 1955–1994
- Artillery School 1969–
- Test Firing Centre 1969–2012 / Explosives Centre 2013–
- United Nations Training Centre 1969–2001 / Finnish Defence Forces International Centre FINCENT 2001–2008
- Pori Brigade 2015–

== Climate ==
The climate is a continental subarctic frontier (Köppen: Dfc); the installed weather station serves as the basis for the city of Kankaanpää.

Climate data for Kankaanpää (Niinisalo), elevation: 136 m or 446 ft, 1961-1990 normals and extremes
| Month | Jan | Feb | Mar | Apr | May | Jun | Jul | Aug | Sep | Oct | Nov | Dec | Year |
|---|---|---|---|---|---|---|---|---|---|---|---|---|---|
| Record high °C (°F) | 7.0 (44.6) | 8.5 (47.3) | 13.5 (56.3) | 21.2 (70.2) | 28.4 (83.1) | 32.5 (90.5) | 30.4 (86.7) | 31.2 (88.2) | 27.7 (81.9) | 16.3 (61.3) | 10.2 (50.4) | 7.0 (44.6) | 32.5 (90.5) |
| Mean daily maximum °C (°F) | −5.1 (22.8) | −4.6 (23.7) | 0.2 (32.4) | 6.3 (43.3) | 14.7 (58.5) | 19.7 (67.5) | 21.1 (70.0) | 18.8 (65.8) | 12.8 (55.0) | 7.0 (44.6) | 1.0 (33.8) | −2.9 (26.8) | 7.4 (45.3) |
| Daily mean °C (°F) | −8.0 (17.6) | −7.8 (18.0) | −3.7 (25.3) | 1.9 (35.4) | 9.0 (48.2) | 14.0 (57.2) | 15.7 (60.3) | 13.8 (56.8) | 8.8 (47.8) | 4.0 (39.2) | −1.3 (29.7) | −5.6 (21.9) | 3.4 (38.1) |
| Mean daily minimum °C (°F) | −11.3 (11.7) | −11.1 (12.0) | −7.4 (18.7) | −2.2 (28.0) | 3.4 (38.1) | 8.2 (46.8) | 10.5 (50.9) | 9.4 (48.9) | 5.3 (41.5) | 1.2 (34.2) | −3.7 (25.3) | −8.7 (16.3) | −0.5 (31.0) |
| Record low °C (°F) | −34.9 (−30.8) | −35.7 (−32.3) | −25.4 (−13.7) | −14.3 (6.3) | −7.0 (19.4) | −3.0 (26.6) | 2.0 (35.6) | 0.2 (32.4) | −5.4 (22.3) | −14.7 (5.5) | −23.8 (−10.8) | −33.0 (−27.4) | −35.7 (−32.3) |
| Average precipitation mm (inches) | 42.0 (1.65) | 29.0 (1.14) | 33.0 (1.30) | 38.0 (1.50) | 37.0 (1.46) | 53.0 (2.09) | 71.0 (2.80) | 80.0 (3.15) | 73.0 (2.87) | 54.0 (2.13) | 59.0 (2.32) | 47.0 (1.85) | 616 (24.26) |
| Average precipitation days (≥ 1.0 mm) | 10.0 | 8.0 | 9.0 | 8.0 | 7.0 | 8.0 | 11.0 | 11.0 | 11.0 | 11.0 | 11.0 | 11.0 | 116 |
Source: NOAA
