= Rovajärvi =

Artillery practice range in Lapland, Finland

Coordinates: 66°43′N 026°46′E

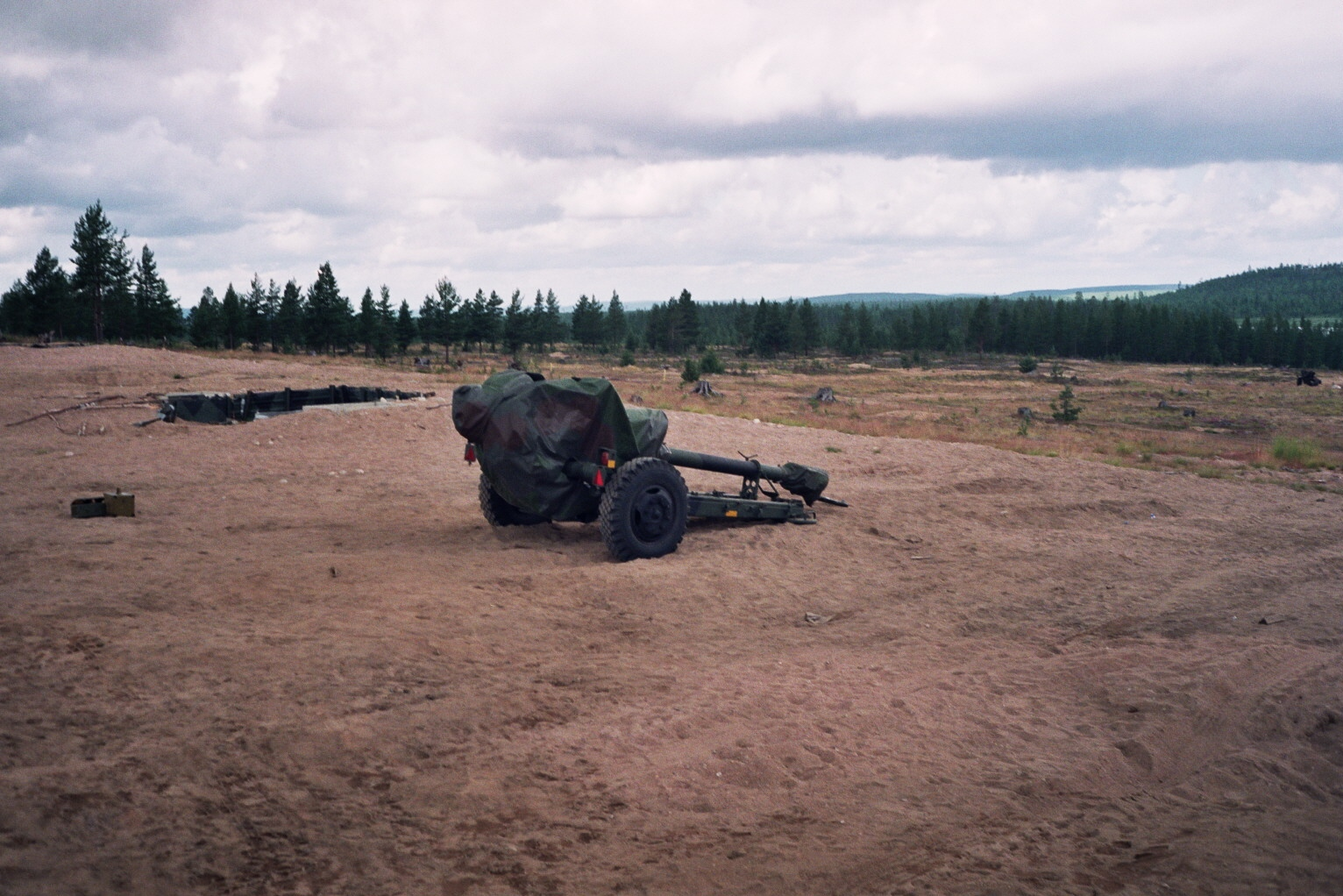
A D-30 howitzer in Rovajärvi, 1997.

Rovajärvi is the main artillery practice range of the Finnish Army. At 1,110 square kilometres (430 sq mi) area, it is the largest practice range of the Finnish Defence Forces, and the largest such range in western Europe. It is located on the Arctic Circle in Lapland, within the municipalities of Rovaniemi and Kemijärvi, and it borders Sodankylä in the north. It is mainly used for large-scale nation-wide training exercises. A two-week general military exercise for artillery conscripts is arranged biannually in Rovajärvi.

In the DCA agreement signed with the United States in 2023, it is agreed that the Rovajärvi training area and the Misi storage area will be made available to the United States if necessary.
