= Deputy Chief of the Air Staff =

Deputy Chief of the Air Staff (DCAS) may refer to:

- Deputy Chief of the Air Staff (Australia)
- Deputy Chief of the Air Staff (India)
- Deputy Chief of the Air Staff (Pakistan)
- Deputy Chief of the Air Staff (United Kingdom)
