= Lauhala =

Lauhala, lau meaning "leaf" in the Hawaiian language, refers to the leaves of the hala tree (Pandanus tectorius).

== Uses ==
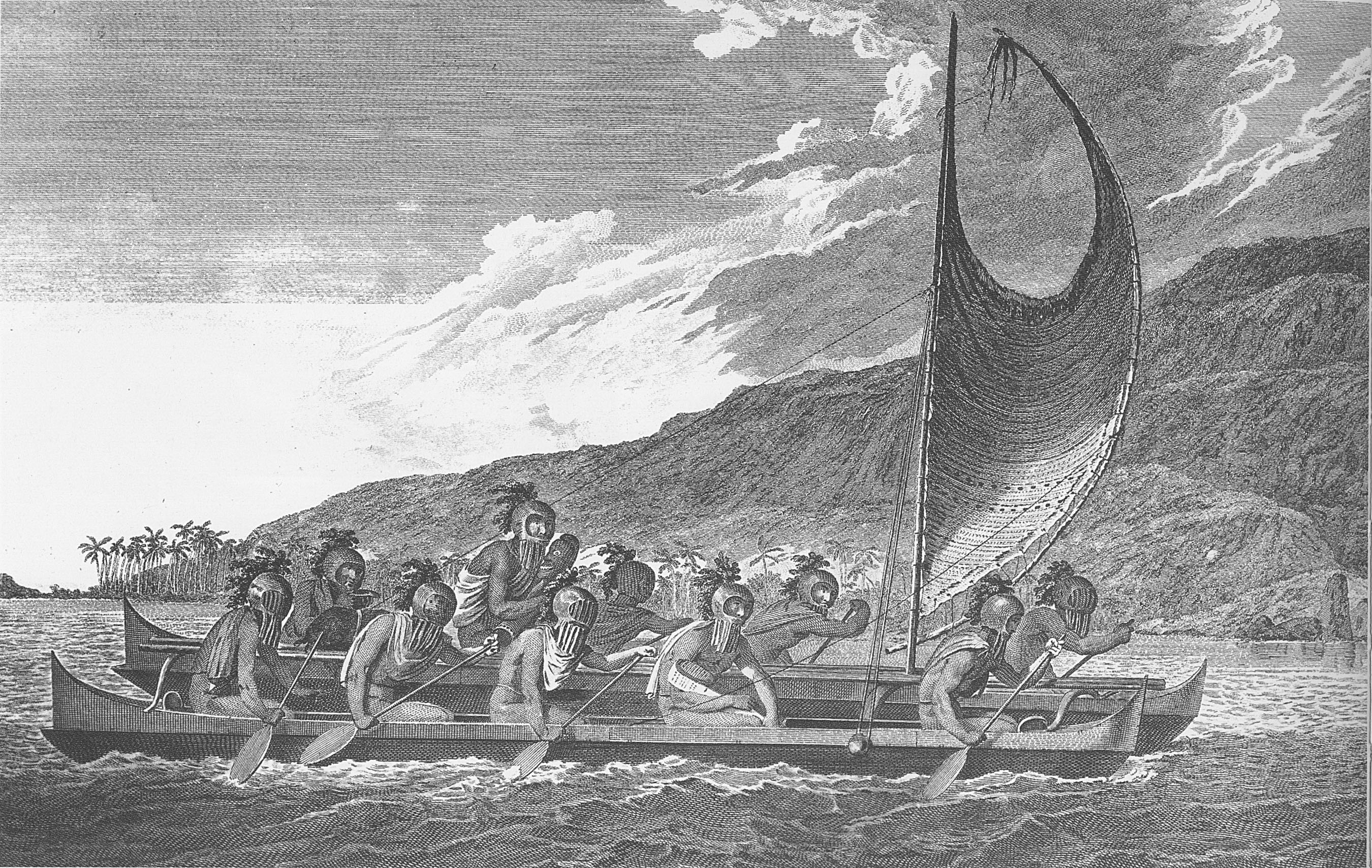
Canoe with sails made from lauhala

The hala tree is of great cultural, health and economic importance in many Pacific Islands. The fruit of the tree is used as a food source in many Pacific Islands. The fruits are often consumed fresh or as a preserved food while the trunks of P. tectorius can be used as building material, and leaves for thatching. Though many parts of the hala tree are utilized, in Hawaii the most common use of Hala is the leaves.

Hawaiians distinguish five kinds of the hala tree according to the colour and size of the fruits:

- hala ʻula (orange red)
- hala lihilihi ʻula (red tip, becoming yellow to the centre)
- hala ʻīkoi (bright orange only at the tip)
- hala melemele (yellow)
- hala pia (not quite white, small fruit)

== Weaving ==
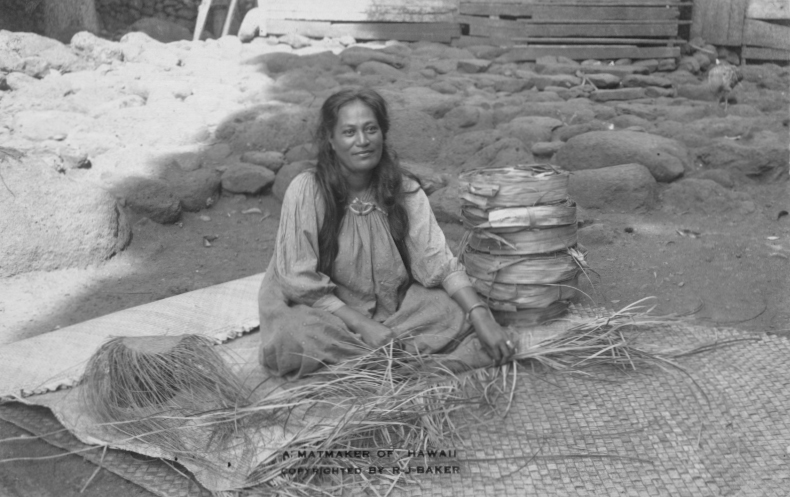
Hawaiian woman weaving lauhala mat with rolls of prepared leaves called kūkaʻa

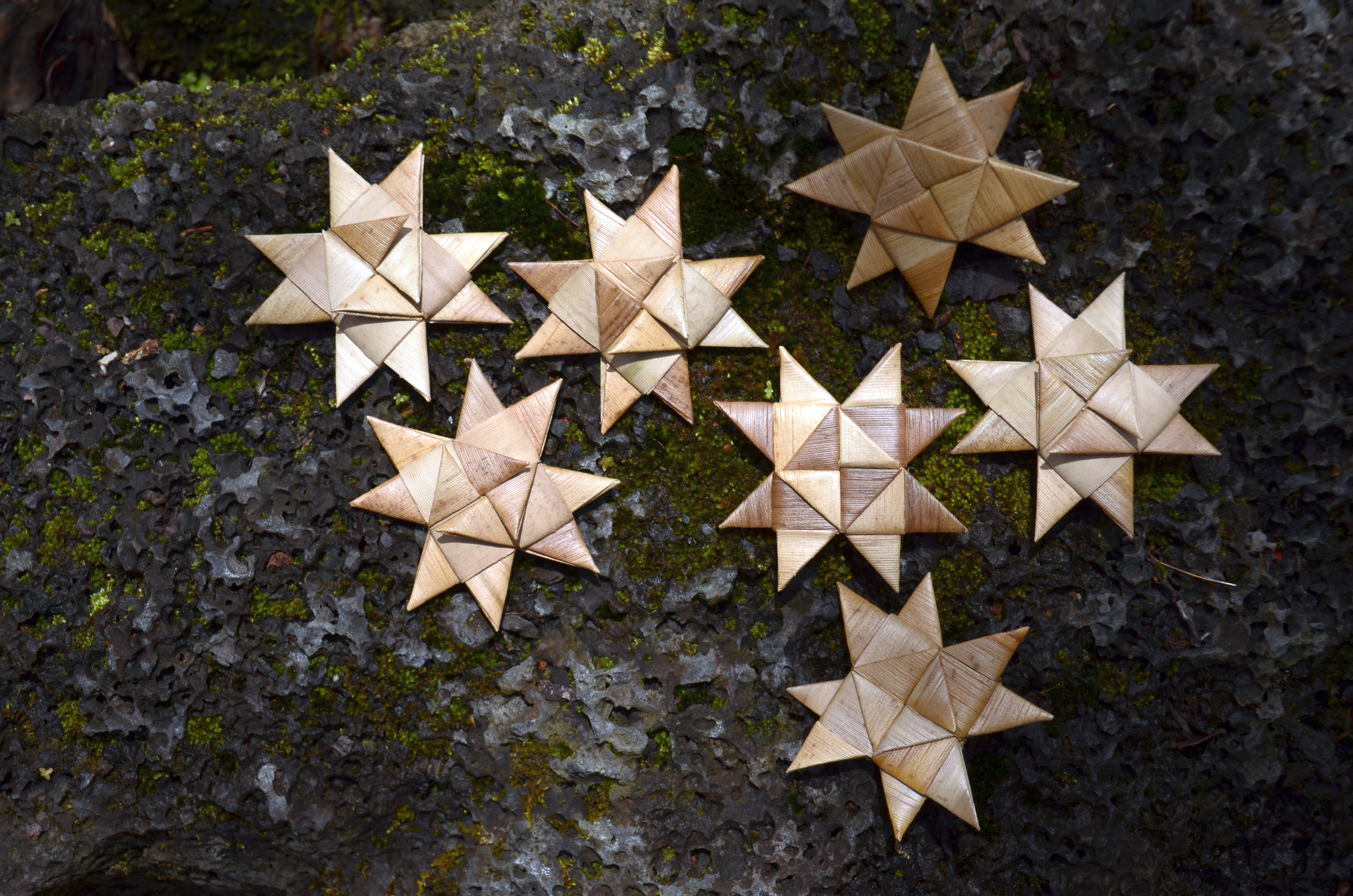
German stars made from lauhala in Puna, Hawaiʻi

Many Pacific cultures weave, plait, or braid the leaves of the P. tectorius to create useful items such as baskets, mats and hats. Though it is a long and arduous process to prepare the leaves for weaving, the final products are works of art with a pleasing earthy feel.

Remains of lauhala from burial caves in Hawaiʻi show almost the same patterns as more recent woven objects, therefore the tradition of this craft seems to be very old. The district of Puna on the Island of Hawaiʻi was known for the abundance of hala.

During the Hawaiian Renaissance the lauhala weaving became popular again, and nowadays also non traditional items.

== Types of Lauhala ==
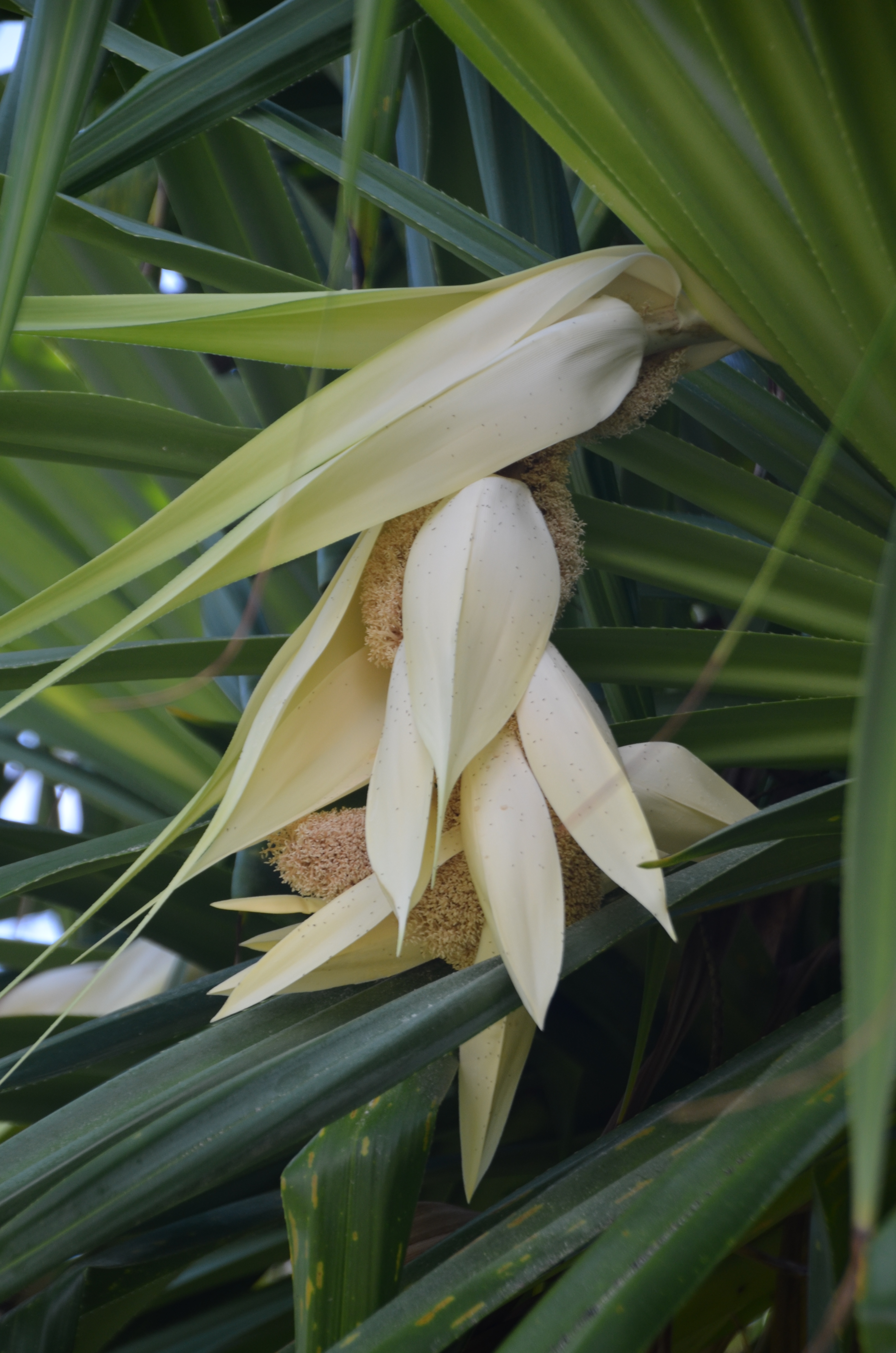
Hīnano: the rare male flower of hala (Pandanus tectorius)

The favored lauhala for weaving was called "lauhala kilipaki". The leaves of this Pandanus sp. were exceptionally soft and durable. They were highly prized for their beauty in color and the ease with which they could be plaited. Special sleeping mats were created out of the "Hīnano", male flower, of the hala tree. The light colored bracts were very soft and pliable and made very finely woven mats reserved for the chiefs (moena hīnano' or ʻahu hīnano). They were especially prized because of their scarcity. Male plants are much less common in the wild than female, and they only make a few flowers per season. The bracts are also very short, about 25 centimetres (9.8 in) long and 15 centimetres (5.9 in) wide, with only about two thirds of the bract actually usable for weaving.
