= Bigherd =

Village in Fars province, Iran

Bigherd Persian: بيغرد
- town
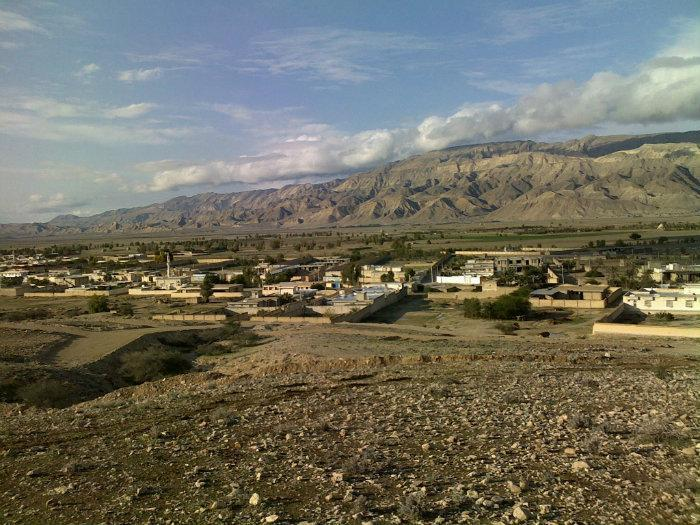

- Location within Iran
- Coordinates: 27°51′16″N 53°36′58″E
- Country: Iran
- Province: Fars
- County: Khonj
- District: Central
- Rural District: Tang-e Narak
- First settled: 14th century

Population (2016)
  - Total: 2,593
- Time zone: UTC+3:30 (IRST)

Bigherd (Persian: بيغرد) (Note: Also romanized as Bīgherd; also known as Bīqerd and Bokherd) is a village in, and the capital of, Tang-e Narak Rural District of the Central District of Khonj County, Fars province, Iran.

Bigherd,khonj

== History ==
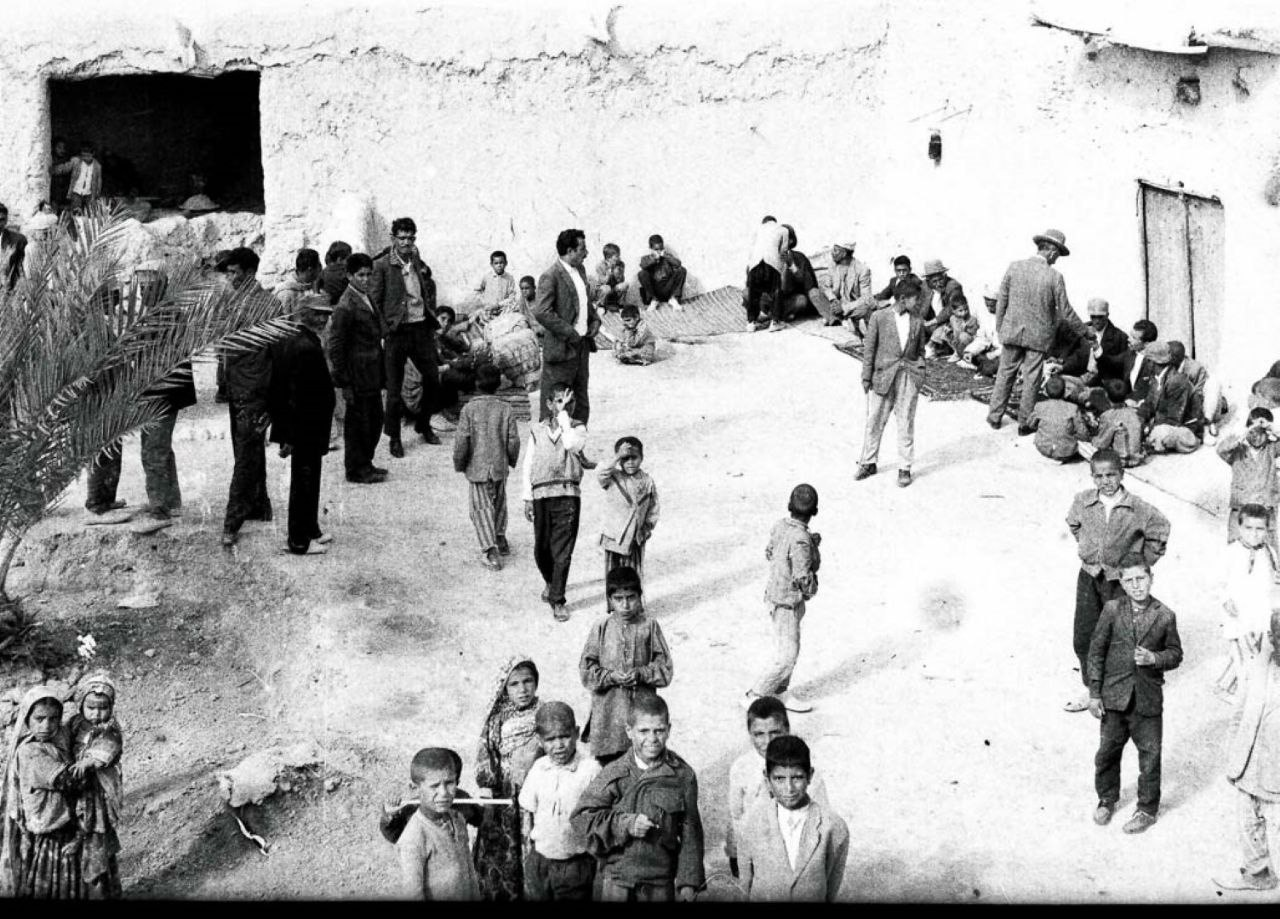
A wedding in Bigherd, 1960s

Bigherd, has a rich 700-year history, The population in Bigherd is originally descended from Khonj, moving into Bigherd in the 14th century, some other people from kariyan moved into bigherd after the 1914 famine in Iran, they are called the "karyuni" people in the local language, meaning they came from kariyan

Many of the Bigherd population have moved to GCC countries as early as the 1950s as expats. Bigherd is also a common place for earthquakes, with one on 18 November 1998. Five people were killed as a result of the earthquake, and 80 injured. Between 50 and 100% of the houses in Bigherd village sustained some significant degree of damage.

A second earthquake measuring 4.8 on the Richter scale occurred at 22:00 local time on the same day. Roads to the area reportedly remain blocked due to landslides, making access to gather information and to transport possible casualties impossible.

Kal’e Tokh Palace (Tokh Castle), was completely destroyed due to the great Bigherd earthquake, it belonged to Ahmad Tokh.

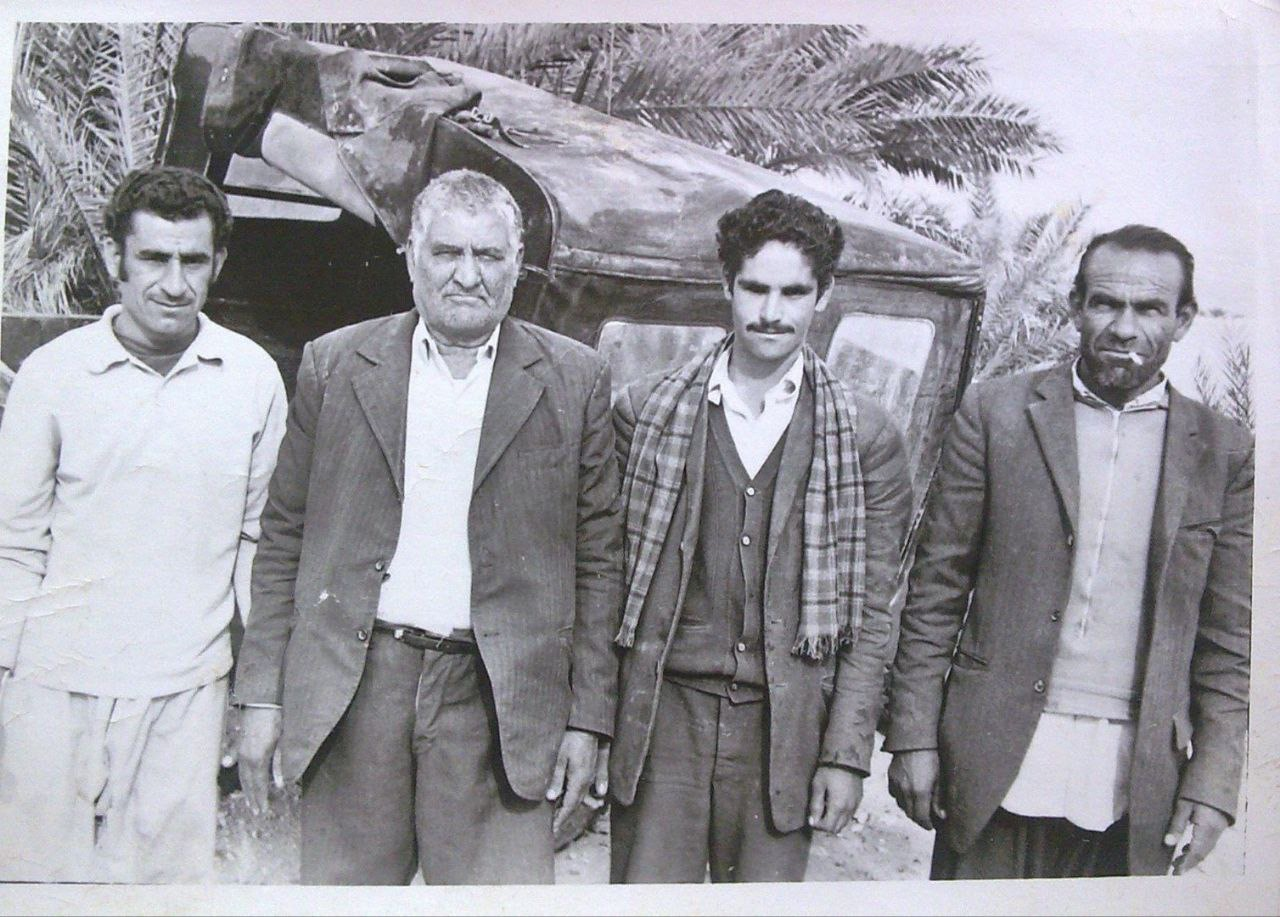
Bigherd's last chief (second to left) in the 1970s. The tradition of a village chief started in the 14th century Bigherd and was abolished after the Iranian revolution in 1979

Ahmad Tokh was the chief of Bigherd. He was a Prince at the time of Al-Kia, and was exiled to the south of the country (Bigherd) after the fall of the government. His palace was destroyed by cannons during the Qajar rule

During the Iranian revolution many Bigherdis hated the idea of disposing the shah, even today they dislike the government, and during the revolution many Bigherdis welcomed khosrow khan qashqai, thinking he would be the future leader, but eventually khosrow khan was executed in 1982

=== Projects ===
Bigherd has been quickly developing for the past 20 years, with many projects being added, like the Bigherd park, opened in 2020 and made from a fundraiser by Kavoos Ghasemi, there was also the Bigherd sports center, made in honor of Fardin, a well known individual diagnosed with Down syndrome in the village.

== Demographics ==
=== Population ===
At the time of the 2006 National Census, the village's population was 2,469 in 419 households. The following census in 2011 counted 2,719 people in 651 households. The 2016 census measured the population of the village as 2,593 people in 664 households. It was the most populous village in its rural district.

== Overview ==
The town is located 15 km from Khonj. Its exports are dates and watermelons. The watermelons from bigherd are considered the best type of watermelons in the region.

The name Bigherd in the Avestani language means “The Khodadade region”, which historians believe is derived from a river called Bigh-rood that existed in the 14th century, bigh-rood means “beside the river” in Persian The climate of this area is hot and dry. This village is known as the jewel of Larestan because of its rapid and sudden development and having countless benefactors. Bigherd has more than 800 residential houses and a population of more than 2,593 people. Bigherd is the center of Tang e Narak district. The people of bigherd speak the achomi language and the religion of the bigherdi people is Sunni Shafi'i Islam. The ancient and natural areas of bigherd include Tokh Castle; Shahneshin Castle; Tange Narak Spring; Tomb of Pirjafti; Tomb of Seyyed Makram. The town has made significant progress since 2010 at the hands of Bigherd's benefactors.it also had two old schools in the 70s and now it has a kindergarten and six schools for boys and girls, and its new schools were established in the 1990s and the 2000s

== Historical monuments ==
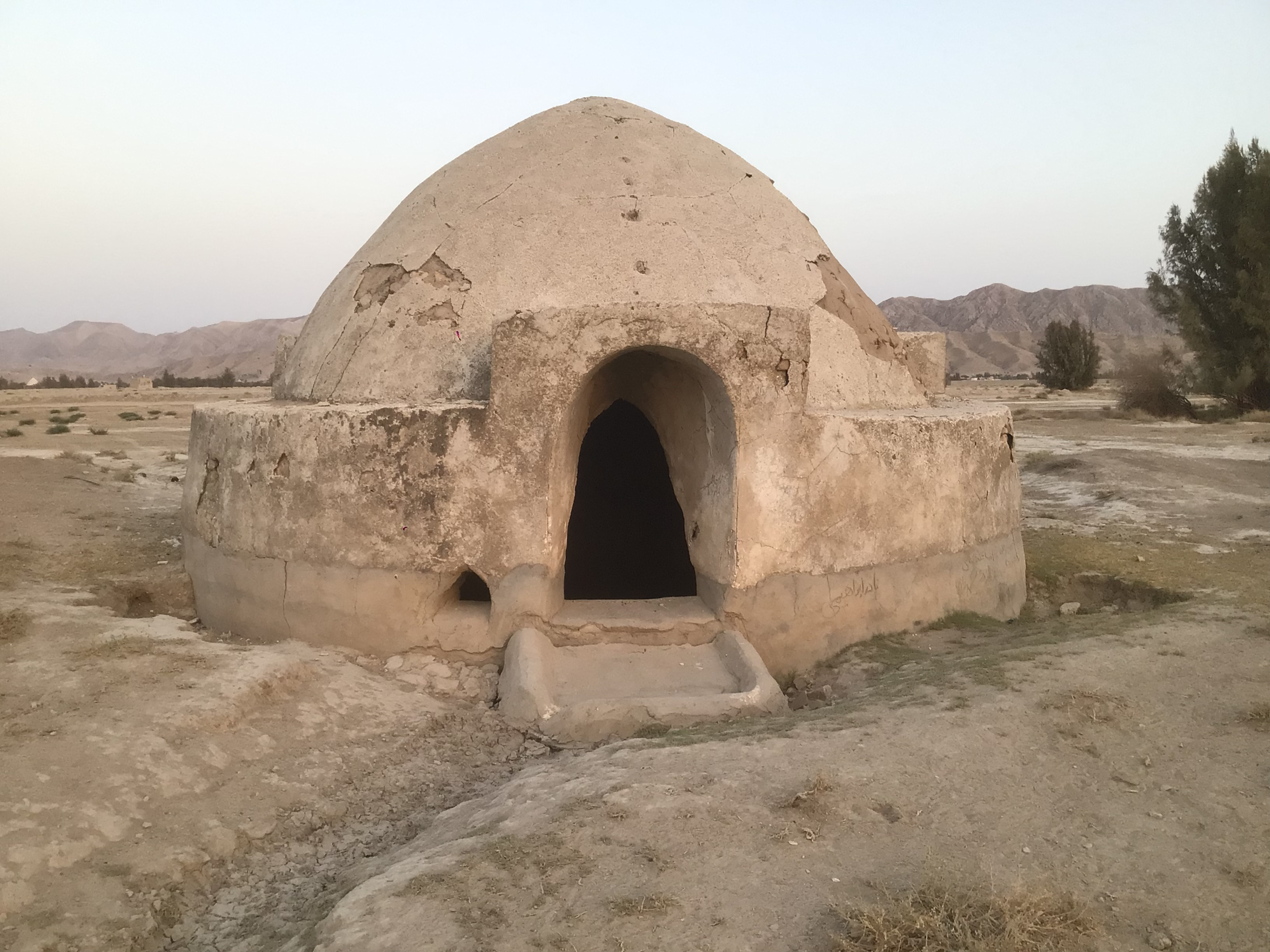
Berka aali, 2023

Bigherd's landmarks have been changing throughout time, because of the earthquakes that hit the village, not all buildings survive that long, Bigherd's most well known landmark is berka aali (برکه عالی), an abanbar (called berka in the Achomi language) built during the qajar times, it has gone through many earthquakes and floods, yet it still stands strong.
