= Shahrestan, Khonj =

Shahrestan شهرستان
- Village
- Country: Iran
- Province: Fars
- County: Khonj
- Bakhsh: Central
- Rural District: Seyfabad

Population (2006)
  - Total: 110
- Time zone: UTC+3:30 (IRST)
  - Summer (DST): UTC+4:30 (IRDT)

Shahrestan (Persian: شهرستان, also Romanized as Shahrestān) is a village in Seyfabad Rural District, in the Central District of Khonj County, Fars province, Iran. At the 2006 census, its population was 110, in 21 families.
