= Shenayez =

Shenayez شنايز
- Village
- Location within Iran
- Coordinates: 27°46′38″N 53°12′01″E
- Country: Iran
- Province: Fars
- County: Khonj
- Bakhsh: Mahmeleh
- Rural District: Mahmeleh

Population (2006)
  - Total: 43
- Time zone: UTC+3:30 (IRST)
  - Summer (DST): UTC+4:30 (IRDT)

Shenayez (Persian: شنايز, also Romanized as Shenāyez; also known as Shenā’ez and Shenā’īz) is a village in Mahmeleh Rural District, Mahmeleh District, Khonj County, Fars province, Iran. At the 2006 census, its population was 43, in 11 families.
