= Maz =

Maz مز
- Village
- Location within Iran
- Coordinates: 27°43′34″N 53°27′42″E
- Country: Iran
- Province: Fars
- County: Khonj
- Bakhsh: Mahmeleh
- Rural District: Mahmeleh

Population (2006)
  - Total: 873
- Time zone: UTC+3:30 (IRST)
  - Summer (DST): UTC+4:30 (IRDT)

Maz (Persian: مز, also Romanized as Mez; also known as Marz and Moḩammadābād-e Maz) is a village in Mahmeleh Rural District, Mahmeleh District, Khonj County, Fars province, Iran. At the 2006 census, its population was 873, in 179 families.
