= Ashna, Khonj =

Ashna اشنا
- Village
- Location within Iran
- Coordinates: 27°44′34″N 53°24′25″E
- Country: Iran
- Province: Fars
- County: Khonj
- Bakhsh: Mahmeleh
- Rural District: Mahmeleh

Population (2006)
  - Total: 750
- Time zone: UTC+3:30 (IRST)
  - Summer (DST): UTC+4:30 (IRDT)

Ashna (Persian: اشنا, also Romanized as Āshnā; also known as Āshenā) is a village in Mahmeleh Rural District, Mahmeleh District, Khonj County, Fars province, Iran. At the 2006 census, its population was 750, in 165 families.
