= Khonj Free Islamic University =

Khonj Free Islamic University دانشگاه آزاد اسلامي خنج
- Village/university
- Country: Iran
- Province: Fars
- County: Khonj
- Bakhsh: Central
- Rural District: Seyfabad

Population (2006)
  - Total: 18
- Time zone: UTC+3:30 (IRST)
  - Summer (DST): UTC+4:30 (IRDT)

Khonj Free Islamic University (Persian: دانشگاه آزاد اسلامي خنج – Dāneshegāh-e Āzād Eslāmī-ye Khonj) is a village and university in Seyfabad Rural District, in the Central District of Khonj County, Fars province, Iran. At the 2006 census, its population was 18, in 4 families.
