= Laghar =

Laghar لاغر
- Village
- Location within Iran
- Coordinates: 28°11′23″N 53°08′31″E
- Country: Iran
- Province: Fars
- County: Khonj
- Bakhsh: Central
- Rural District: Seyfabad

Population (2006)
  - Total: 697
- Time zone: UTC+3:30 (IRST)
  - Summer (DST): UTC+4:30 (IRDT)

Laghar (Persian: لاغر, also Romanized as Lāghar) is a village in Seyfabad Rural District, in the Central District of Khonj County, Fars province, Iran. At the 2006 census, its population was 697, in 130 families.
