= Daravay Diyu =

Daravay Diyu درواي ديو
- Village
- Location within Iran
- Coordinates: 28°06′12″N 53°23′28″E
- Country: Iran
- Province: Fars
- County: Khonj
- Bakhsh: Central
- Rural District: Seyfabad

Population (2006)
  - Total: 136
- Time zone: UTC+3:30 (IRST)
  - Summer (DST): UTC+4:30 (IRDT)

Daravay Diyu (Persian: درواي ديو, also Romanized as Daravāy Dīyū; also known as Darāvandī) is a village in Seyfabad Rural District, in the Central District of Khonj County, Fars province, Iran. At the 2006 census, its population was 136, in 28 families.
