= Takhteh =

Takhteh (Persian: تخته) may refer to:

- Takhteh, Fars
- Takhteh, Gilan
- Takhteh, Kurdistan
- Takhteh (tables game), Persian name for the tables game of Tavla
