= Zanguiyeh =

Zanguiyeh or Zanguyeh (Persian: زنگوييه or زنگويه) may refer to various places in Iran:

- Zanguiyeh, Firuzabad (زنگويه - Zangūīyeh), Fars Province
- Zanguyeh, Khonj (زنگويه - Zangūyeh), Fars Province
- Zanguiyeh, Jiorft (زنگوييه = Zangū’īyeh), Kerman Province
- Zanguiyeh-ye Olya, Zarand County, Kerman Province
