= Lowzu =

Lowzu لوزو
- Village
- Location within Iran
- Coordinates: 27°53′47″N 53°21′36″E
- Country: Iran
- Province: Fars
- County: Khonj
- Bakhsh: Central
- Rural District: Seyfabad

Population (2006)
  - Total: 9
- Time zone: UTC+3:30 (IRST)
  - Summer (DST): UTC+4:30 (IRDT)

Lowzu (Persian: لوزو, also Romanized as Lowzū) is a village in Seyfabad Rural District, in the Central District of Khonj County, Fars province, Iran. At the 2006 census, its population was 9, in 4 families.
