= Shahrak-e Cham Kuku =

Shahrak-e Cham Kuku شهرك چم كوكو
- Village
- Country: Iran
- Province: Fars
- County: Khonj
- Bakhsh: Central
- Rural District: Seyfabad

Population (2006)
  - Total: 275
- Time zone: UTC+3:30 (IRST)
  - Summer (DST): UTC+4:30 (IRDT)

Shahrak-e Cham Kuku (Persian: شهرك چم كوكو, also Romanized as Shahrak-e Cham Kūkū) is a village in Seyfabad Rural District, in the Central District of Khonj County, Fars province, Iran. At the 2006 census, its population was 275, in 57 families.
