= Kheyrabad, Khonj =

Kheyrabad خير اباد
- Village
- Location within Iran
- Coordinates: 28°06′17″N 53°10′48″E
- Country: Iran
- Province: Fars
- County: Khonj
- Bakhsh: Central
- Rural District: Seyfabad

Population (2006)
  - Total: 48
- Time zone: UTC+3:30 (IRST)
  - Summer (DST): UTC+4:30 (IRDT)

Kheyrabad (Persian: خير اباد, also Romanized as Kheyrābād) is a village in Seyfabad Rural District, in the Central District of Khonj County, Fars province, Iran. At the 2006 census, its population was 48, in 9 families.
