= Jahreh =

Jahreh جهره
- Village
- Location within Iran
- Coordinates: 28°14′39″N 53°10′20″E
- Country: Iran
- Province: Fars
- County: Khonj
- Bakhsh: Central
- Rural District: Seyfabad

Population (2006)
  - Total: 577
- Time zone: UTC+3:30 (IRST)
  - Summer (DST): UTC+4:30 (IRDT)

Jahreh (Persian: جهره) is a village in Seyfabad Rural District, in the Central District of Khonj County, Fars province, Iran. At the 2006 census, its population was 577, in 122 families.
