= Shahrak-e Makuyeh =

Shahrak-e Makuyeh شهرك مكويه
- Village
- Location within Iran
- Coordinates: 28°11′55″N 53°07′05″E
- Country: Iran
- Province: Fars
- County: Khonj
- Bakhsh: Central
- Rural District: Seyfabad

Population (2006)
  - Total: 854
- Time zone: UTC+3:30 (IRST)
  - Summer (DST): UTC+4:30 (IRDT)

Shahrak-e Makuyeh (Persian: شهرك مكويه, also Romanized as Shahrak-e Makūyeh; also known as Makūyeh) is a village in Seyfabad Rural District, in the Central District of Khonj County, Fars province, Iran. At the 2006 census, its population was 854, in 165 families.
