= Fiduyeh =

Fiduyeh فيدويه
- Village
- Location within Iran
- Coordinates: 28°00′32″N 52°48′00″E
- Country: Iran
- Province: Fars
- County: Khonj
- Bakhsh: Mahmeleh
- Rural District: Baghan

Population (2006)
  - Total: 402
- Time zone: UTC+3:30 (IRST)
  - Summer (DST): UTC+4:30 (IRDT)

Fiduyeh (Persian: فيدويه, also Romanized as Fīdūyeh; also known as Fadooyeh) is a village in Baghan Rural District, Mahmeleh District, Khonj County, Fars province, Iran. At the 2006 census, its population was 402, in 80 families.
