= Janguyeh =

Janguyeh جنگويه
- Village
- Location within Iran
- Coordinates: 28°05′11″N 53°16′26″E
- Country: Iran
- Province: Fars
- County: Khonj
- Bakhsh: Central
- Rural District: Seyfabad

Population (2006)
  - Total: 461
- Time zone: UTC+3:30 (IRST)
  - Summer (DST): UTC+4:30 (IRDT)

Janguyeh (Persian: جنگويه, also Romanized as Jangūyeh; also known as Changū, Jangū, and Jengū) is a village in Seyfabad Rural District, in the Central District of Khonj County, Fars province, Iran. At the 2006 census, its population was 461, in 94 families.
