= Gazivaz =

Gazivaz گزيوز
- Village
- Location within Iran
- Coordinates: 27°59′30″N 53°02′29″E
- Country: Iran
- Province: Fars
- County: Khonj
- Bakhsh: Mahmeleh
- Rural District: Baghan

Population (2006)
  - Total: 121
- Time zone: UTC+3:30 (IRST)
  - Summer (DST): UTC+4:30 (IRDT)

Gazivaz (Persian: گزيوز, also Romanized as Gazīvaz; also known as Gazīvar) is a village in Baghan Rural District, Mahmeleh District, Khonj County, Fars province, Iran. At the 2006 census, its population was 121, in 25 families.
