= Mina, Fars =

Mina مينا
- Village
- Location within Iran
- Coordinates: 27°46′59″N 53°09′58″E
- Country: Iran
- Province: Fars
- County: Khonj
- Bakhsh: Mahmeleh
- Rural District: Mahmeleh

Population (2006)
  - Total: 38
- Time zone: UTC+3:30 (IRST)
  - Summer (DST): UTC+4:30 (IRDT)

Mina (Persian: مينا, also Romanized as Mīnā) is a village in Mahmeleh Rural District, Mahmeleh District, Khonj County, Fars province, Iran. At the 2006 census, its population was 38, in 8 families.
