= Galleh Dari Mohammad Nuratbayi =

Galleh Dari Mohammad Nuratbayi گله دارئ محمد نوراطبايي
- Village
- Country: Iran
- Province: Fars
- County: Khonj
- Bakhsh: Central
- Rural District: Tang-e Narak

Population (2006)
  - Total: 24
- Time zone: UTC+3:30 (IRST)
  - Summer (DST): UTC+4:30 (IRDT)

Galleh Dari Mohammad Nuratbayi (Persian: گله دارئ محمد نوراطبايي, also Romanized as Galleh Dāri Moḩammad Nūrāţbāyī) is a village in Tang-e Narak Rural District, in the Central District of Khonj County, Fars province, Iran. At the 2006 census, its population was 24, in 5 families.
