= Shahrak-e Chah Tala =

Shahrak-e Chah Tala شهرك چاه طلا
- Village
- Location within Iran
- Coordinates: 28°09′49″N 53°10′59″E
- Country: Iran
- Province: Fars
- County: Khonj
- Bakhsh: Central
- Rural District: Seyfabad

Population (2006)
  - Total: 555
- Time zone: UTC+3:30 (IRST)
  - Summer (DST): UTC+4:30 (IRDT)

Shahrak-e Chah Tala (Persian: شهرك چاه طلا, also Romanized as Shahrak-e Chāh Ţalā; also known as Chāh Ţalā) is a village in Seyfabad Rural District, in the Central District of Khonj County, Fars province, Iran. At the 2006 census, its population was 555, in 106 families. The people of this small town are a branch of Qashqaei, a big Turkish nomad group in south of Iran. In this town almost 900_100 people live and the main source of their income is agriculture. The first part of the name of this town ('Chah' means in Persian well and second part 'Talla' means gold) is indicating the source of the good amount and quality of water in this dry part of Iran. These years many young people of this town immigrate to bigger cities to improve their quality of life. As mentioned they are the people who were nomad and usually were traveling to warmer place in the winter and colder in the summer but around the world war 2 the king of Iran, Reza Shah, ordered to accommodate all nomads in Iran to elevate the quality of education and health among these nomads. The people of this town speak Turkish language and their religion is Islam. There is also a division among the families in this town which indicate who is from which family and the divisions are(Kariman, Kachalzali, Cheragh zali, Go zal and Olad zali). The most people of this town has the suffix Saroei after their family name and indeed Saroei is the name of their tribe.
