= Engineers (Finnish Defence Forces) =

Service branch of the Finnish Army

- Pioneerit
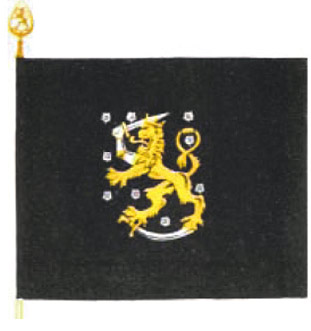
- The Colours of the Jäger engineers, later also used by the Engineer Regiment
- Country: Finland
- Role: Military engineering
- March: Pioneerien taistelulaulu Koljonvirran marssi
- Anniversaries: 25 July (Battle of Schmarden)

Commanders
- Inspector of Engineering and CBRNe: Colonel Riku Mikkonen
- Navy Chief of Engineers: Lt Cdr Juha Lepistö
- Air Force Chief of Engineers: Major Joni Pirinen

Insignia
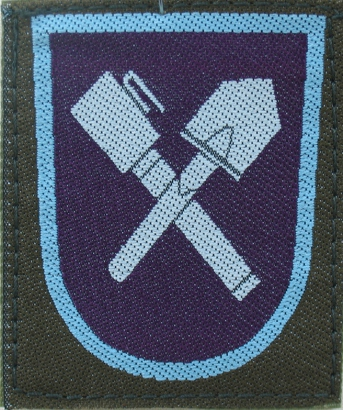
- Engineer training branch insignia (Pioneeri)

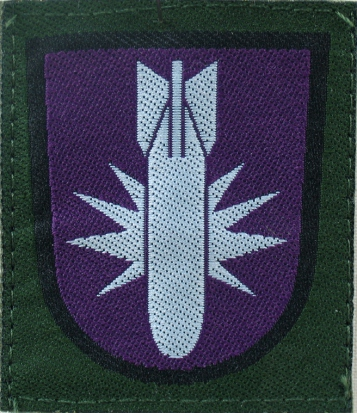
- EOD training branch insignia (Raivaajapioneeri)

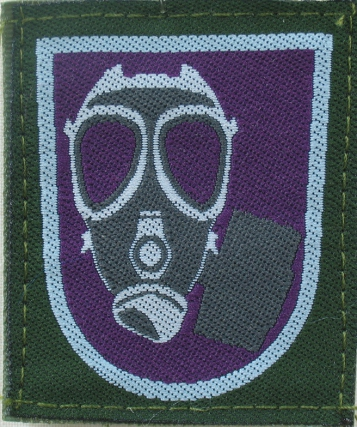
- CBRNe training branch insignia (Suojelumies)

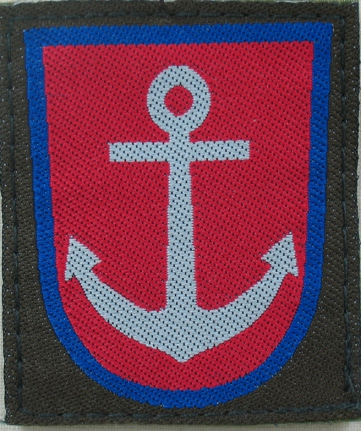
- Boat man training branch insignia (Venemies)

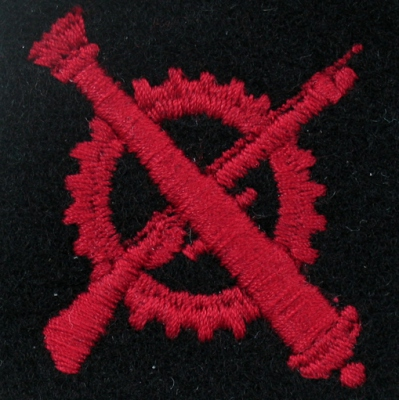
- Training branch insignia used by Navy engineers (Merivoimien Pioneeri)

Engineers (Finnish: Pioneerit, Swedish: Pionjär) is a service branch of the Finnish Army. The branch contains the training branches of engineering, explosive ordnance disposal (EOD), and CBRNe. Engineering equipment operators are also trained for the branch's needs. Engineers are responsible for aiding the movement of friendly troops and disrupting the enemy's movement, EOD clear explosives in challenging areas, and CBRNe is responsible with dealing against chemical, biological, nuclear and incendiary weapons.

== History ==
=== Swedish rule ===
The earliest record of Finnish military engineering was crossing the river Lech in 1632 during the Battle of Rain. Finnish troops would perform engineering tasks in several other wars during Swedish rule.

=== Jäger Movement ===
During the First World War, almost 1,900 Finnish men went to Germany to receive military training as part of the Jäger Movement. Out of the volunteers was formed the 27th Jäger Battalion.

An engineer company was formed in the Lockstedter Lager training unit on 28 August 1915. Their training involved various engineer skills, such as fortification, mining, makeshift bridges, and pontoons, in addition to infantry training. When the battalion was formed in May 1916 and sent to the front, the engineer company was 249 strong, 217 of whom were Finnish. When the battalion went to the front on the Misa river, the engineers were designated as the reserve, and worked on building fortifications. Watery conditions, disease, and problems with food supply made conditions miserable.

On 22 July 1916 the engineers received a movement order, and the next day they, excluding the German non-commissioned officers and 32 Finns, marched to the Riga–Jelgava Railway and were transported to the Schlamp station, from where they moved to encamp at Sale. The next evening the engineers moved to the rally point where they were divided into the infantry squads, 2-3 men per one, of the Reserve Jäger Battalion 1. The attack began at midnight, with the engineers' acting commander lieutenant Basse staying behind. The engineers successfully reached the Russian positions at Smārde (German: Schmarden) and captured five enemies. The Finns received praise from the Germans, including General Wyneken. Two Finns, Paavo Kinnunen and Matti Fält, died as a result of the battle. The battle was the so-called Jäger engineers' (jääkäripioneeri) babtism by fire, and became known as the Battle of Schmarden. Its anniversary is celebrated as the branch's anniversary day.

The engineers returned to near Smārde on 14 August 1916 to conduct building and forest clearing work. As the German engineers had previously thought the work to be too dangerous, the Finns gained a reputation for courage, which resulted in better food supply reliability.

The battalion moved to the coast of the Gulf of Riga in late August, and the engineers did missions deemed communal or dangerous. The engineers did construction, including the fortification of a base called Laus, destruction of visual barriers, and supported patrols.

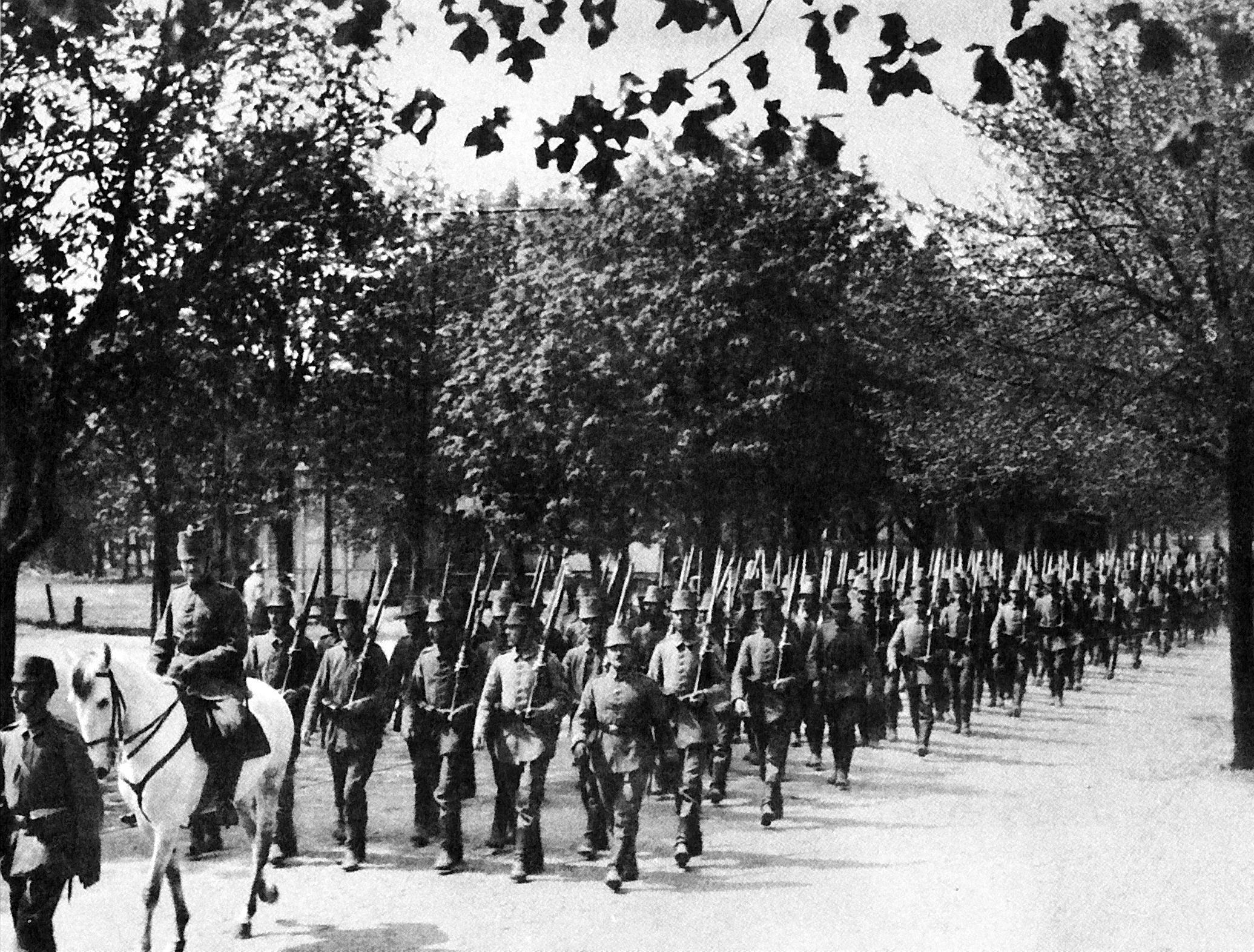
The engineer company, Liepāja summer 1917

The battalion moved to Liepāja for training and preparations for a return to Finland in March 1917. Most of the company spent the spring and early summer on an engineer course, with many Finns from other companies also participating. Some engineers also participated in other specialized courses. The engineer company had 152 men when the majority of Finns returned to Finland 25 February 1918. The jägers dispersed to various units on return. Less engineers were sent to the Altona-Barenfeld work detachment, meaning they received less disciplinary punishments, and more received the Jäger Memorial Badge, i.e. served honourably, than on average.

=== Early independence ===
During the Finnish Civil War engineers on both sides focused mostly on the destruction and repair or railways, especially railway bridges. There was not much engineer activity, as many Jäger engineers commanded infantry due to the lack of experienced soldiers.

Early doctrine was mainly based on German and French ones. The building of fortifications was held as an important among Finnish engineers, and it was trained up to the beginning of the Winter War.

Engineer Battalion 1 was founded at Koria on 9 December 1920.

The Technical Troops Command was formed in 1921, following the French model, under which Engineers was also designated. According to Santeri Sohlman, this unification of command was as much a strategic decision, as a way of cutting on costs. Under it Engineer and Signals officers had the same base training, and would often work in units belonging to both branches during their careers.

The Technical Troops were disbanded on 30 April 1927, with its commander becoming the Inspector of Technical and Logistics Troops, who lead the branch specific training and equipping of Logistics and the Erillinen hyökkäysvaunukomppania tank company in addition to Engineers and Signals.

The Inspector of Technical and Logistics Troops became the Technical Inspector of the Defence Forces in 1933, with the Engineer and Signal units of all branches of the Defence Forces coming under his control, and the War Technical School (Sotateknillinen koulu) for technical troops was founded. For the existence in various forms of technical troops, they were led by Engineer trained officer Unio Sarlin. Separate Engineer and Signals sections were formed on 4 October 1939, as centralized command of Engineer troops was needed for maximizing the efficiency of fortification works.

In the 1920s, with divisions included two engineer companies, with separate engineer units for use of higher command. Engineer skills focused on building fortifications, water crossings, and the maintenance of roadways.

The creation of engineer battalions, three companies, for divisions, with special road maintenance units for corps was decided before the Winter War but was not implemented before it began.

Coming into the 1930s, engineers were still focused supporting movement in line with the attack focused spirit of the Finnish Army at the time. During the decade the focus formed around movement support and counter-mobility. Mining also started became its own thing, and anti-tank work became more emphasized towards the end of the decade. However counter-mobility tactics were not integrated into unit training until the very end of the decade. The development of Iivari's quick bridge enabled infantry to perform small water crossing on their own, enabling engineers to focus on larger crossings.

The Gas Protection School (Kaasusuojelukoulu) was founded in Vyborg in 1933. The need for protection against battle gases was well accounted for in the wartime structure of units.

=== The Winter War ===
Finnish equipment during the Winter War was inadequate, with only 5,000 anti-tank mines, leading to improvised mines being used.

Although there were suspicions of use of chemical weapons by Soviet troops in December 1939, tests were inconclusive, and consensus by the end of the war was that none were used.

Engineer troops were often poorly utilized during the war, even used as infantry, as the lack of field exercises before the war caused problems with branch co-operation. The value of engineers became clear to infantry leadership during the Winter War, as the value anti-tank work cleared the idea that engineers would just build the infantry's fighting positions.

Temporary anti-tank troops were often formed from engineer troops by division commands.

Structural changes were made September 1940. Special units were officially designated independent, as had been practice during the war. The manpower involved in the command of engineer troops was also increased both on the division and corps level. Both experienced further expansions in 1943. Engineer troops were increased and gained mechanical equipment, and co-operation with other branches was developed.

As fortifications had proved to be a great preventer of losses and a leveler of the equipment disparity between Finland and the Soviet Union, it was emphasized and leadership was transferred from the engineer leadership to directly Mannerheim with Edvard Hanell responsible.

=== The Continuation War ===
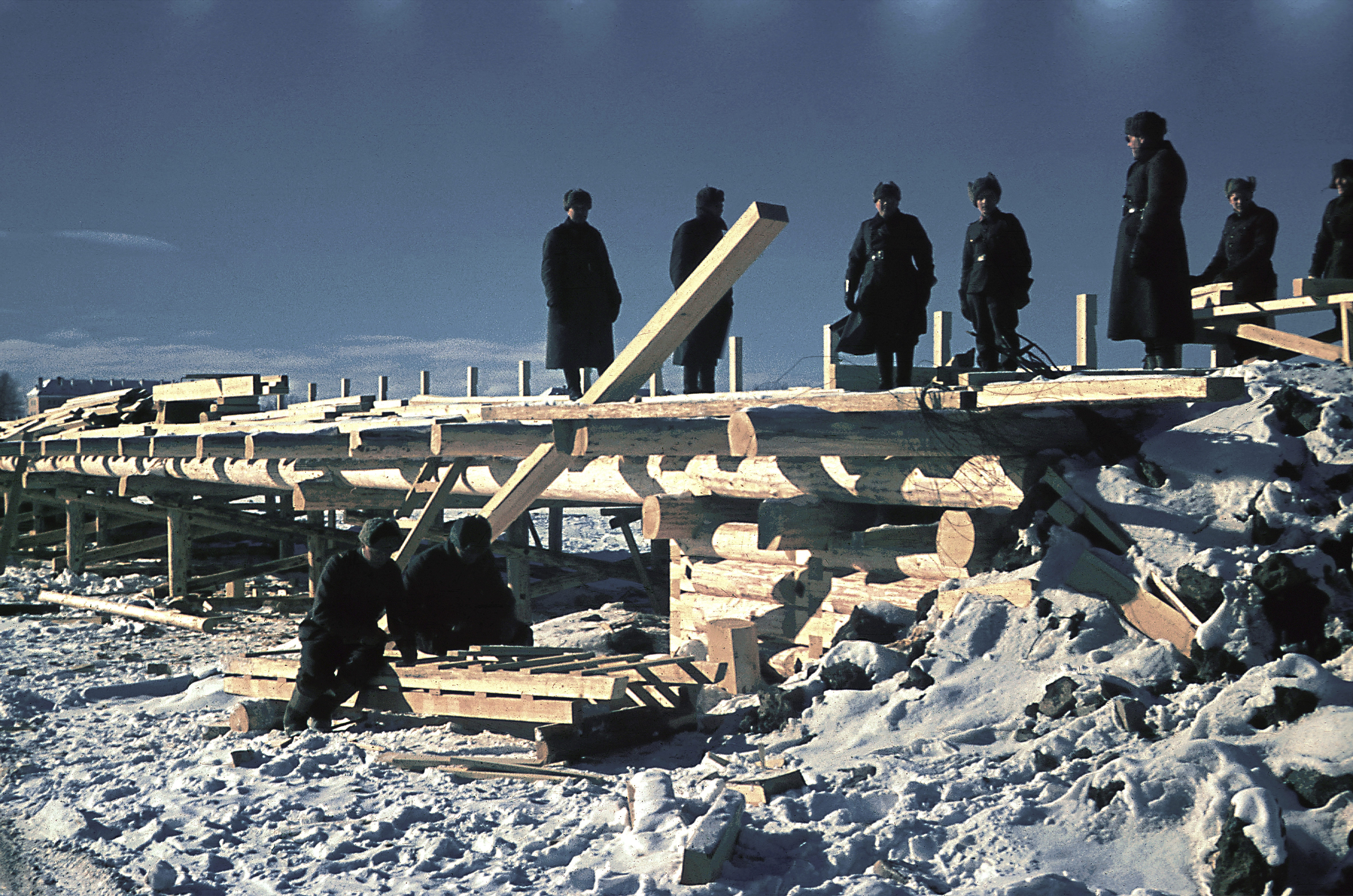
Engineers building a bridge over the Svir river, Voznesenye 18 March 1942.

During the offensive phase of the Continuation War engineers focused on mobility operations, with frontline troops clearing enemy mines and facilitating water crossings. Rear troops fixed roads and bridges.

During the slow phase engineers had responsibility for fortifying the front. The deep counter-mobility (syvä suluttaminen) skill was developed during this time. Focus was on the maintenance of obstacles and the expansion and maintenance of roadways

During the retreat phase of the Karelian offensive in the summer of 1944, engineers were responsible for destroying routes in order to slow the Soviet advance, and helping friendly mobility. After the Soviet assault was stopped, counter-mobility and road work became important.

As the need for combat engineers capable of clearing dugouts became clear during the Winter War, Walter Horn in autumn 1940 and Eero-Eetu Saarinen in February 1941, were sent to observe German combat engineer training. Germany did not allow more Finnish participation till April 1942 when 28 engineer officers participated on a specially held course.

Combat engineers as a training branch was started, and training began in June 1941, although it was cut short by the beginning of hostilities. During the war combat engineer roles, such as strike groups and flamethrower use, was formalized on various unit levels.

Due to the lack of CBRNe threats, CBRNe troops focused on tasks such as disinfection, pest termination, and fire fighting. The use of covering smoke was also designated to CBRNe. Engineers also used smoke grenades and boxes during assaults.

=== The Lapland War ===
Due to the prevalence of rivers and German obstacles, there was a large amount of engineer troops assigned to the III Corps during the Lapland War. Engineers focused on clearing counter-mobility measures and repairing destroyed roads and bridges.

=== Post-war ===
Deming in Porkkala, 1956

After the end of hostilities with the Soviet Union, demining operations both inside Finland and the ceded territories began.

The Keuruu Engineer Regiment was founded in 1967.

Deep counter-mobility was codified in the 1960s and the three stages of barrier readiness, III: barrier planned and prepared with reserved materials, II: barrier mostly executed with passage possible at limited points, I: barrier fully executed with no passage possible, were defined in the 1980s.

CBRNe was folded into the engineers in 1991.

Involvement in international operations since the 1990s has helped develop competence in the branch.

=== Post 2000 ===
Finland joined the Ottawa Treaty banning anti-personnel mines (AP mines) in 2012, and destroyed last of the banned mines in 2015. Former head of the Department of Strategy at the National Defence University of Finland, Heikki Hult, has spoken that AP mines are the most important part of infantry warfare, and that the ban is unnecessary as Finnish mines are always well documented. In contrast, Chief of Operations, Jari Kallio, has said that other systems have effectively filled the void left by AP mines, except for the psychological effect of mine terror.

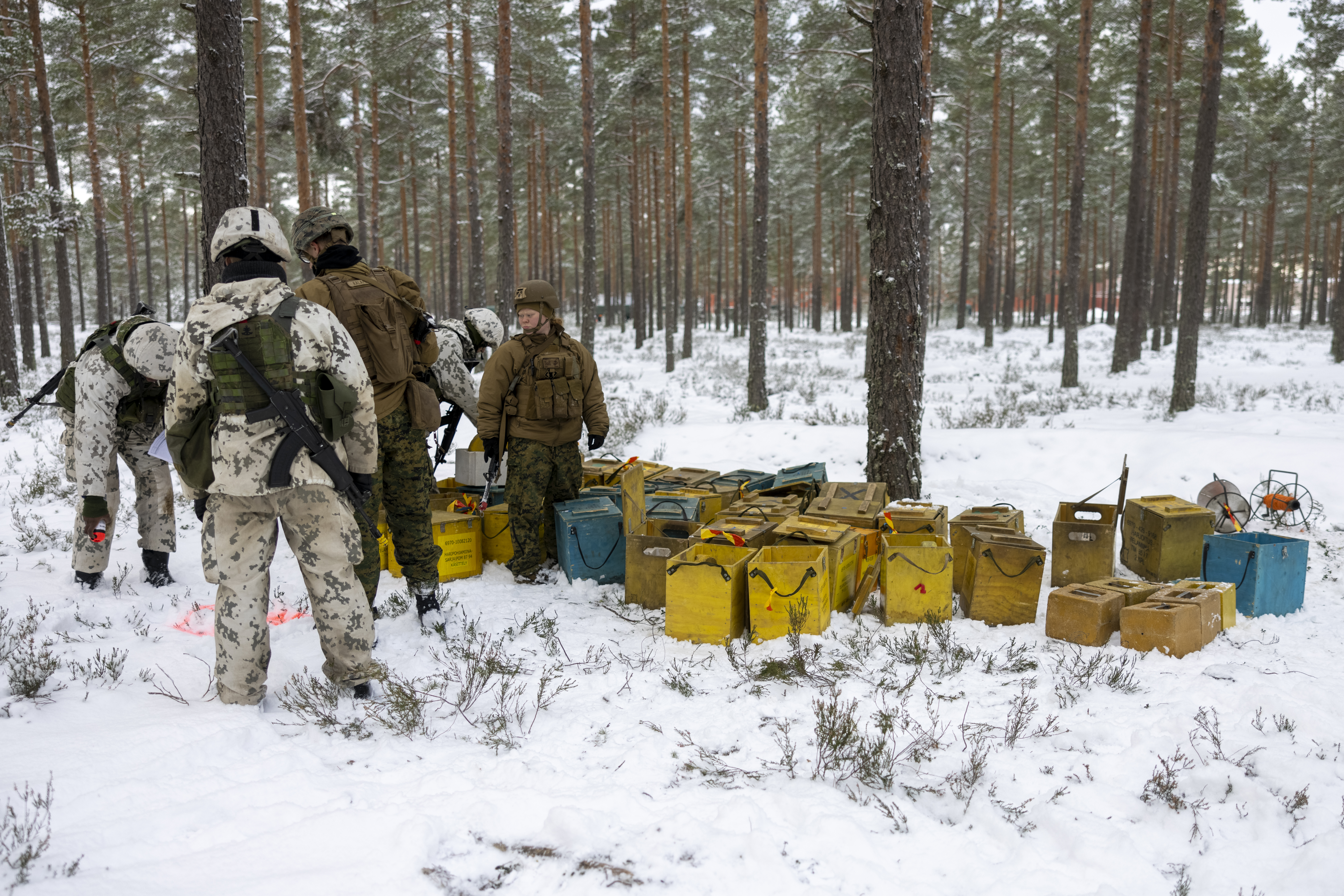
Finnish and American troops training anti-tank mining

Finnish troops from the Keuruu Engineer Regiment performed risk assessments and oversight during the destruction of Syria's chemical weapons. They began their work in December 2013 and returned to Finland in July 2014. 18 professional and reserve soldiers were involved in the operation.

The Keuruu Engineer Regiment was disbanded on 31 December 2014.

Chief of Defence Janne Jaakkola spoke on the need of re-evaluating Finland's participation in the Ottowa Treaty based on the mass use of infantry by Russia in the invasion of Ukraine, in October 2026. Following this, a civic initiative was submitted and gained the required signatures, and the Finnish Government started considering withdrawal. The parliament voted in favor of withdrawal on 19 June 2025, and it came into effect on 10 January 2026. The training and preparation of acquisitions started on the same day, with directional charges beginning to be trained as mines using tripwires, and newly designed Finnish made mines planned to begin use in 2027.

== Training and units ==
As of 2026, engineers are trained at the following units:

Karelia Brigade:

- Kymi Engineer Battalion: Boat drivers
  - 1st Engineer Company: Non-commissioned officer (NCO) training, readiness unit combat engineers, engineer equipment operators
  - 2nd Engineer Company: counter-mobility engineers, combat engineers
  - EOD Company: EOD NCOs for all FDF units, EOD

Kainuu Brigade:

- Pohja Engineer Battalion: Engineers, pontoons, boat drivers, CBRNe reconnaissance, and equipment operators
  - 1st Engineer Company
  - Technical Company

Pori Brigade:

- Satakunta Engineer and Signals Battalion:
  - 1st Engineer Company: Combat engineers.
  - CBRNe Company: CBRNe

Armoured Brigade:

- Häme Armoured Battalion
  - Armoured Engineer Company: Combat engineers, crews for Leopard 2 Urdan mine roller, Leguan armored rapid bridge, and MTLB.

Jaeger Brigade:

- Lapland Jaeger Battalion:
  - 1st Jaeger Company: ranks and file combat engineers
  - Heavy Support Arms Company: Engineer platoons. NCO training is done in Kainuu Brigade

Guard Jaeger Regiment:

- 1st and 2nd Military Police Company: A selected numbers of specialist
- 1st Jaeger Company: Engineer fireteams for urban areas

Nyland Brigade (Navy):

- Ekenäs Coastal Battalion:
  - Engineer Company: Combat engineers, coastal engineers, EOD, rescue, and engineering equipment operators

Lapland Border Guard District (Border Guard):

- Border Jaeger Company (Ivalo): All trained in basic engineer skills, with possibility of further specialization

North Karelia Border Guard District (Border Guard):

- Border Jaeger Company (Onttola): All trained in basic engineer skills, with possibility of further specialization

Southeast Finland Border Guard District (Border Guard):

- Special Border Jaeger Company (Imatra): Possible specialization

Army Academy:

- Reserve Officer School: All reserve officers
- The Education and Training Centre: Planning, preparing, and implementing training for professional soldiers
  - Engineer School: Branch specific training of engineering Cadet and Master of military science students
- Army Research Centre: Research and development

All of the units also include various supporting roles, such as truck drivers and signals.

Colours of engineer units
Kymi Engineer Battalion

Pohja Engineer Battalion

Satakunta Engineer and Signals Battalion

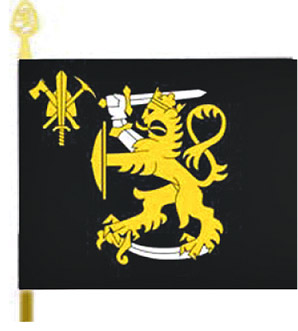
Engineer and CBRNe school

== Insignia ==
Engineer collar insignia

When collar insignia came to use in 1936, engineers were considered a part of the technical troops, which utilized purple plates with black piping. Since 1939 engineers have used their own collar insignia, a purple plate with light grey piping. Purple is an international colour of science and technology, and grey might be referring to infantry, which also has grey piping on their collar insignia.

From 1996 to 2003, CBRNe troops used orange plates with blue piping, reflecting the international colours of civil defence. As of 2026 they share the insignia of the wider engineer branch.

When the training branch insignia were taken into use on 5 December 1949, the jäger engineer insignia was the same as the current general purpose engineer one, but with a green background. The Engineer Regiment had their own, a red cog with a yellow explosion on a red background behind it. The current EOD insignia was authorized in the 2000s.

There exists an unofficial training branch insignia for urban engineer that is used during exercises.

== See also ==
- Hakku (magazine), the branch magazine of Finnish military engineers
- Engineers Museum, former museum of Finnish military engineering. Merged to form Museo Militaria.
- List of equipment of the Finnish Army#Military engineering vehicles
- Field artillery (Finnish Defence Forces)
- Signals (Finnish Defence Forces)
- Ground-based air defence (Finnish Defence Forces)
- Logistics (Finnish Defence Forces)
