= Khanbaghi =

Khanbaghi or Khan Baghi (Persian: خان باغي) may refer to:

- Khanbaghi, East Azerbaijan
- Khan Baghi, Fars
- Khan Baghi, Kurdistan
