= Sedeh, Khonj =

Village in Fars province, Iran

Sedeh Persian: سده
- Village
- Location within Iran
- Coordinates: 27°55′32″N 53°26′01″E
- Country: Iran
- Province: Fars
- County: Khonj
- District: Central
- Rural District: Seyfabad

Population (2016)
  - Total: 2,137
- Time zone: UTC+3:30 (IRST)

Sedeh (Persian: سده) (Note: Also known as Seh Deh) is a village in Seyfabad Rural District of the Central District of Khonj County, Fars province, Iran.

== Demographics ==
=== Population ===
At the time of the 2006 National Census, the village's population was 2,028 in 428 households. The following census in 2011 counted 2,326 people in 566 households. The 2016 census measured the population of the village as 2,137 people in 584 households. It was the most populous village in its rural district.
