= Zanagu =

Zanagu or Zangu (Persian: زنگو) may refer to:

- Zanagu, South Khorasan
- Zangu, West Azerbaijan

== See also ==
- Zanguiyeh (disambiguation)
