= Hongu =

Hongu may refer to:

- Hongu, Iran (disambiguation)
- Hongū, Wakayama, Japan
- Hongu River, in Nepal
- Mount Hongū, in Japan
- Hongū Station, in Japan
