= Kahnuyeh, Khonj =

Kahnuyeh كهنويه
- Village
- Location within Iran
- Coordinates: 28°03′24″N 53°16′50″E
- Country: Iran
- Province: Fars
- County: Khonj
- Bakhsh: Central
- Rural District: Seyfabad

Population (2006)
  - Total: 1,073
- Time zone: UTC+3:30 (IRST)
  - Summer (DST): UTC+4:30 (IRDT)

Kahnuyeh (Persian: كهنويه, also Romanized as Kahnūyeh; also known as Hakku and Ḩakū) is a village in Seyfabad Rural District, in the Central District of Khonj County, Fars province, Iran. At the 2006 census, its population was 1,073, in 194 families.
