= Zanguyeh, Khonj =

Zanguyeh زنگويه
- Village
- Location within Iran
- Coordinates: 27°47′24″N 53°03′00″E
- Country: Iran
- Province: Fars
- County: Khonj
- Bakhsh: Mahmeleh
- Rural District: Mahmeleh

Population (2006)
  - Total: 215
- Time zone: UTC+3:30 (IRST)
  - Summer (DST): UTC+4:30 (IRDT)

Zanguyeh (Persian: زنگويه, also Romanized as Zangūyeh) is a village in Mahmeleh Rural District, Mahmeleh District, Khonj County, Fars province, Iran. At the 2006 census, its population was 215, in 42 families.
