= Battle of Schmarden =

Battle on the Eastern Front during the First World War

Coordinates: 56°54′46.2″N 23°21′25.3″E

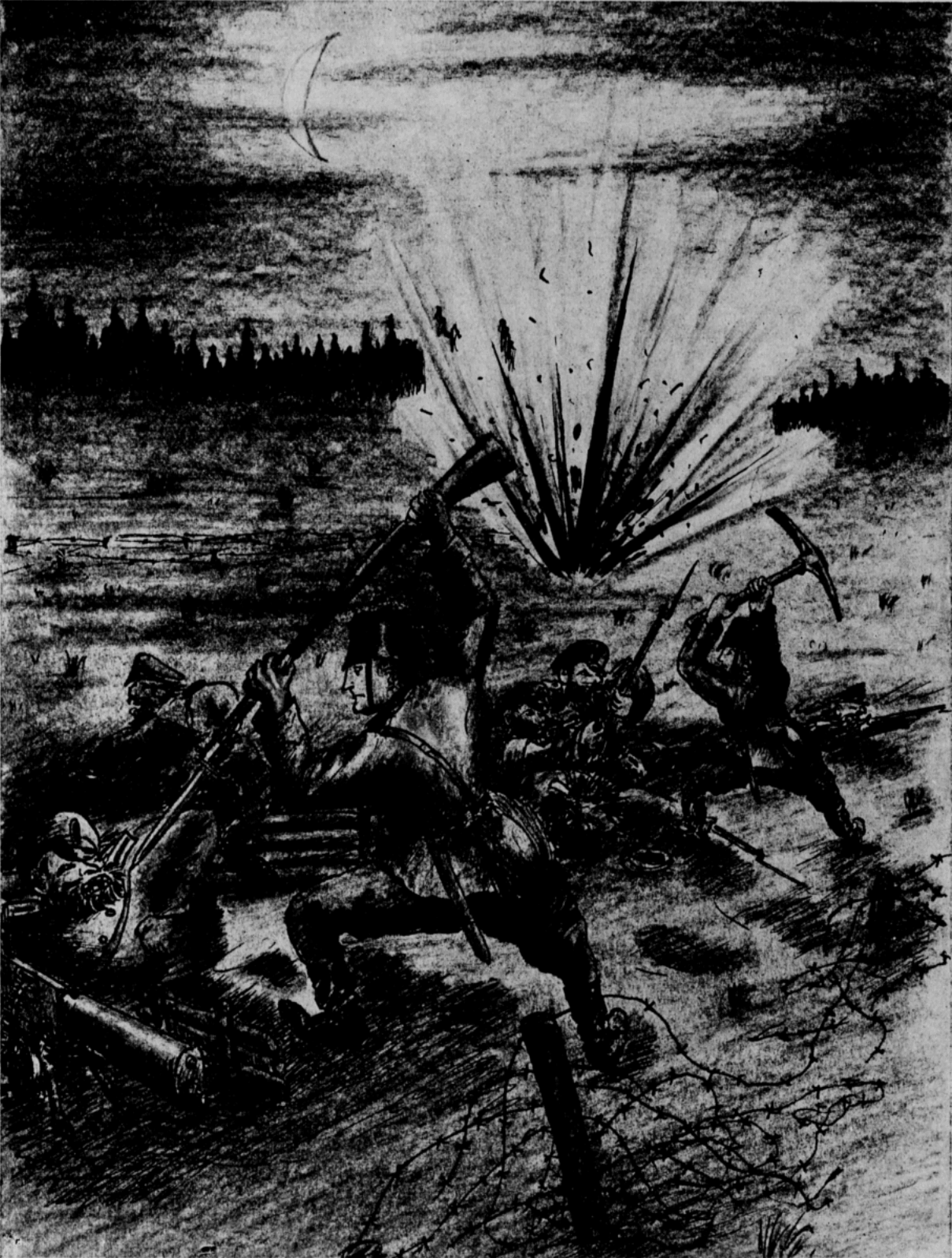
- Depiction of the battle, published in Hakku 25 July 1933
Date	25 July 1916
Location	Smārde, Latvia

Belligerents
German Empire	Russian Empire

Units involved
(German Empire) 1st Reserve Jäger Battalion (German Empire) 27th Jäger Battalion Engineer Company	

Strength
1st Reserve Jäger Battalion: Around 1,000 27th Jäger Battalion: Almost 200	

Casualties and losses
1st Reserve Jäger Battalion: 51–90 casualties (Note: Mees & Wittig: 8 fallen, 43 wounded; Valtonen: 12 fallen, 41 wounded; Lackman: Around 90 casualties) 27th Jäger Battalion: 1 fallen 1 fatally wounded 8 wounded	Numerous casualties (Note: Lauerma: "The amount of dead and wounded is impossible to even roughly approximate") 16–18 taken prisoner (Note: Lauerma: 16; Valtonen: "16 prisoners were taken, five of which by the Finns (according to a German source the total number of prisoners was 18)")
- Starting point of the German attack within Latvia

The Battle of Schmarden was fought on in the village of Smārde (then German: Schmarden) on the Eastern Front in what is now Latvia during the First World War. The attacking force of German included many Finnish volunteers from the 27th Jäger Battalion's engineer company, and is celebrated as the anniversary day of Finnish military Engineers.

== Prelude ==
The mission was a scouting attack (German: Gewaltsame Erkundung), with the purpose of straightening the frontline by destroying the Russian forward positions, which were around 3 km long and 800 meters from the German and 600 meters from the Russian positions. The plan was for the first wave of the attack to push the Russians around a kilometre from the forward positions, while the second wave would destroy the Russian positions.

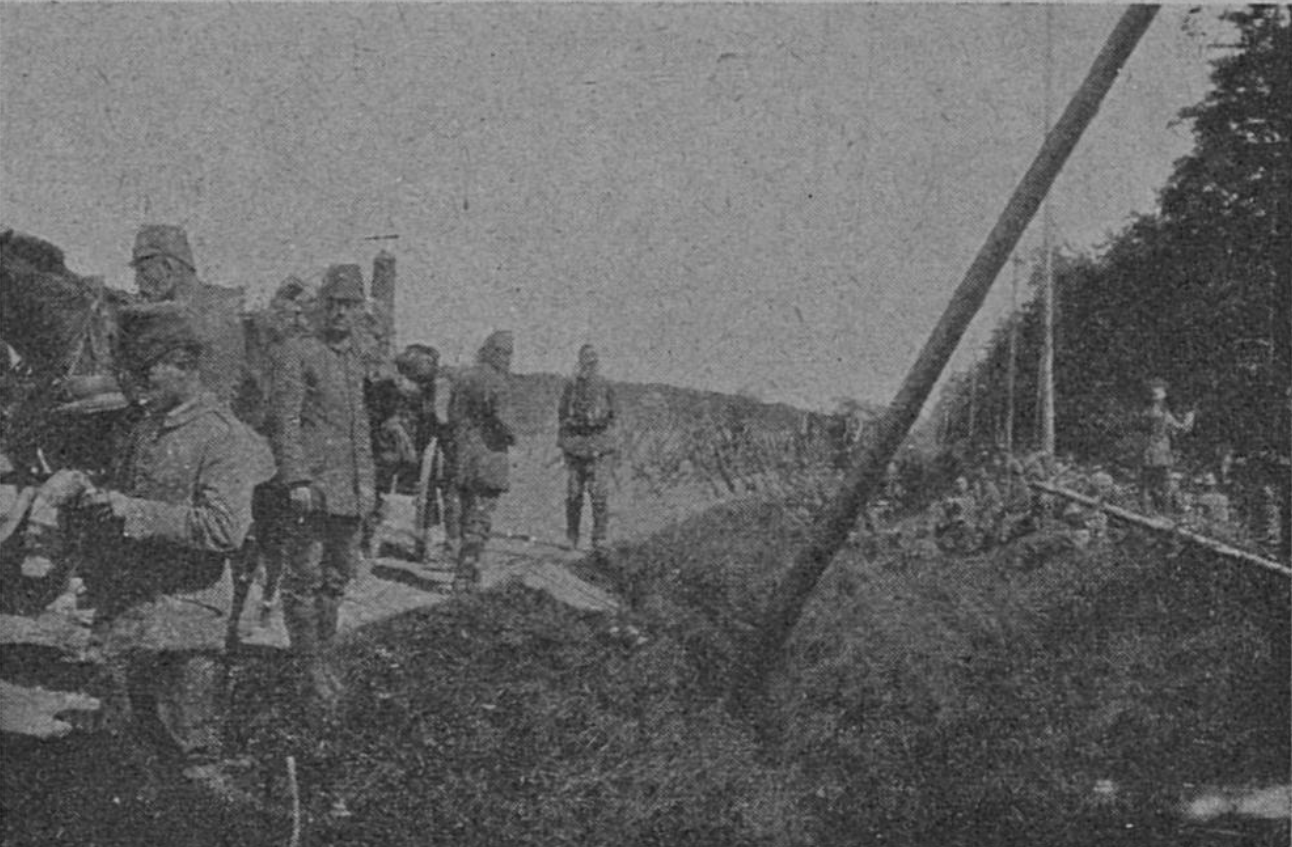
Finnish Jäger engineers eating at the Zauke railway station

Against the wishes of the 27th Jäger Battalion's commander, Maximilian Bayer, who feared the Finns might suffer great losses, on 22 July 1916 the Finnish engineers received a movement order, and the next day they, excluding the German non-commissioned officers and 32 Finns, marched to the Riga–Jelgava Railway and were transported to the Schlamp station, from where they moved to encamp at Sale. The next evening, on the 24th, the engineers moved to the rally point at the house of Skudre, 1.5 km from the front, moving through the challenging parts of the terrain as the area was mostly open, and removed all identification markings from their uniforms in order to prevent exposing their nationality. They arrived at around 20 o'clock, and were divided into the infantry squads of the Reserve Jäger Battalion 1, 2-3 men per one. While standard German practice, this annoyed the Finns, who took it as a sign of distrust. This, along the pride of the distinguished Germans, led to a verbal argument.

At 22 o'clock a scouting patrol was sent, to which Finns were not accepted despite multiple of them volunteering.

At 23 o'clock the attacking force arrived and spread out for the attack at the forwardmost German positions, and the rest of the hour was spent in total silence with no speaking and smoking allowed.

== Battle ==
The attack began at midnight 25 July 1916, with the engineers' acting commander, lieutenant Basse, staying behind, buying the Finns resentment. The attacking force moved past the German barbed wire, trough the no-mans-land, which was natural meadow with sporadic bushes and ditches, with the second wave 200 meters behind the first. At around the halfway point, 300 meters from the Russians, the Russian infantry and machineguns opened fire, followed by Russian artillery. The attackers took cover and started to advance by rushing, with some digging for cover. The attackers advanced so rapidly that some ended up in the German indirect fire meant to cover their advance.

The combat at the positions was largely hand-to-hand, with weapons varying from pickaxes and bayonets to grenades and pistols. The Russians being successfully pushed out of the forward positions, and 16 or 18 Russians, depending on the source, were taken prisoner, five of whom were taken by the Finns. Many Finns had abandoned their bulky shovels during the attack, and the destruction the Russian positions might have been incomplete. The attack was deemed successful, and the attackers retreated with their casualties after roughly an hour. The German casualties were gathered up by the medics at dawn.

== Aftermath ==
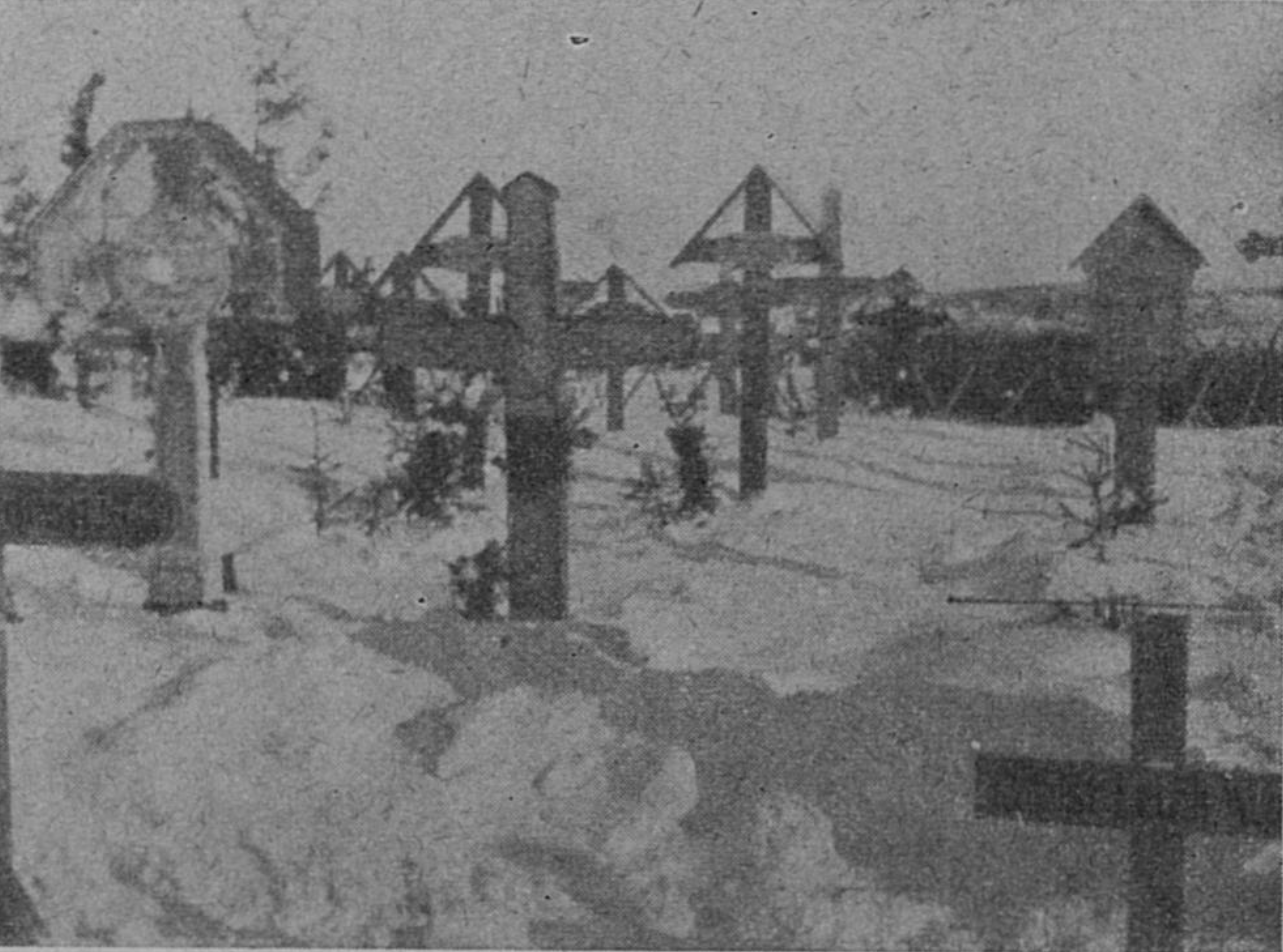
Grave of Jäger Paavo Kinnunen

The German wounded were transported to hospitals in Tukums, where the fallen were also buried at a military cemetery, which has been partially destroyed by sand extraction during communist rule.

The Finnish casualties, one fallen, one missing, and eight wounded, surprised them, as the Finns assessed the attack as particularly dangerous, and thought only few of them would survive. Paavo Kinnunen was the Finnish fallen.

The missing man, then cook, Matti Fält, had accidentally ended up in woods behind the Russian positions, where he was shot in the eye, rendering him unconscious. After gaining consciousness he spotted two Russians, who he ambushed by playing dead and killing them with his bayonet when they came to check on him. The exertion made him lose consciousness again, and after he woke up, he ate and drank. After locating the starting point of the German attack by climbing on the lower branches of a tree, he crawled towards German positions, and managed to gain the attention of German trench lookouts by waving his handkerchief and hat on his bayonet. A patrol was sent out, and he was carried back to the German lines on the 28th. Fält would die from his wounds at a military hospital in Hannover on 13 August 1917, over a year after receiving his wounds. He received the Iron Cross.

The Finnish engineers would rest at the Saale mansion till 27 July, and return to near Smārde on 14 August 1916 to conduct building and forest clearing work.

The Finns were lauded as good soldiers by their commanders. As word of the Finns' bravery reached lieutenant general Otto Wyneken, commander of the 29th Landwehr Infantry Regiment and a well-known teetotaller, came down to the company's position, and offered cigars and beer to the troops. The attack and the Finn's role in it also got a mention in the 8th Army's Order of the Day, and eight Jägers, Erik Jernström, Karl Mandelin, Maximilian Savonius, Unio Sarlin, Väinö Pesonen, and Fält, were awarded the Iron Cross second class.

== Commeration ==
As the battle was the so-called Jäger engineers' (jääkäripioneeri) babtism by fire, its anniversary is celebrated as the branch's anniversary day, called Schmarden Day.

On the 100th anniversary of the battle, a monument commemorating the battle was revealed in Smārde in the presence of both Finnish and Latvian Ministers of Defence, Jussi Niinistö and Raimonds Bergmanis, the ambassador of Finland to Latvia, and around 50 personnel from the Finnish Defence Forces, including Commander of the Finnish Army Seppo Toivonen, Inspector of Engineering and CBRNe Jouko Rauhala, a colour guard, and a section from the Guards Band with the opera singer Heikki Aalto. The song Schmarden, set the tune of Argonnerwaldlied, was debuted at the ceremony. It was recorded and published in 2026, with Aalto as a bass-baritone, and a brass septet from the Guards Band accompanying him.

The monument is made of orbicular granite with the battle's date and symbols of the Finnish Jägers and Engineers inscribed in gold. It was erected by The Schmarden Memorial Committee, started in the Engineer Branch Association, which worked with the 27th Jäger Battalion Tradition League.
