= Takhteh, Fars =

Takhteh تخته
- Village
- Location within Iran
- Coordinates: 28°06′46″N 53°10′54″E
- Country: Iran
- Province: Fars
- County: Khonj
- Bakhsh: Central
- Rural District: Seyfabad

Population (2006)
  - Total: 277
- Time zone: UTC+3:30 (IRST)
  - Summer (DST): UTC+4:30 (IRDT)

Takhteh (Persian: تخته) is a village in Seyfabad Rural District, in the Central District of Khonj County, Fars province, Iran. At the 2006 census, its population was 277, in 58 families.
