= Baghan, Khonj =

Village in Fars province, Iran

Baghan Persian: باغان
- Village
- Location within Iran
- Coordinates: 27°52′13″N 53°06′55″E
- Country: Iran
- Province: Fars
- County: Khonj
- District: Mahmeleh
- Rural District: Baghan

Population (2016)
  - Total: 725
- Time zone: UTC+3:30 (IRST)

Baghan (Persian: باغان) (Note: Also romanized as Bāghān) is a village in, and the capital of, Baghan Rural District of Mahmeleh District, Khonj County, Fars province, Iran.

== Demographics ==
=== Population ===
At the time of the 2006 National Census, the village's population was 717 in 135 households. The following census in 2011 counted 949 people in 186 households. The 2016 census measured the population of the village as 725 people in 207 households.
