= Hakku =

Hakku may refer to:

- Kahnuyeh, Khonj, also known as Hakku, a village in Iran
- Hakku (magazine), the magazine of Finnish military engineers
