= Khan Baghi, Fars =

Khan Baghi خان باغي
- Village
- Location within Iran
- Coordinates: 27°58′13″N 53°09′04″E
- Country: Iran
- Province: Fars
- County: Khonj
- Bakhsh: Mahmeleh
- Rural District: Baghan

Population (2006)
  - Total: 8
- Time zone: UTC+3:30 (IRST)
  - Summer (DST): UTC+4:30 (IRDT)

Khan Baghi (Persian: خان باغي, also Romanized as Khān Bāghī; also known as Khān Bāqī) is a village in Baghan Rural District, Mahmeleh District, Khonj County, Fars province, Iran. At the 2006 census, its population was 8, in 5 families.
