= Seyfabad, Khonj =

Village in Fars province, Iran

Seyfabad Persian: سيف اباد
- Village
- Location within Iran
- Coordinates: 28°09′49″N 53°09′06″E
- Country: Iran
- Province: Fars
- County: Khonj
- District: Central
- Rural District: Seyfabad

Population (2016)
  - Total: 687
- Time zone: UTC+3:30 (IRST)

Seyfabad (Persian: سيف اباد) (Note: Also romanized as Seyfābād) is a village in, and the capital of, Seyfabad Rural District of the Central District of Khonj County, Fars province, Iran.

== Demographics ==
=== Population ===
At the time of the 2006 National Census, the village's population was 621 in 132 households. The following census in 2011 counted 685 people in 166 households. The 2016 census measured the population of the village as 687 people in 192 households.
