= Haftavan, Fars =

Haftavan هفتوان
- Village
- Location within Iran
- Coordinates: 27°49′24″N 53°17′28″E
- Country: Iran
- Province: Turkish
- County: Khonj
- Bakhsh: Mahmeleh
- Rural District: Mahmeleh

Population (2006)
  - Total: 418
- Time zone: UTC+3:30 (IRST)
  - Summer (DST): UTC+4:30 (IRDT)

Haftavan (Persian: هفتوان, also Romanized as Haftavān, Haftovan, and Haftvān; also known as Hafteh Van) is a village in Mahmeleh Rural District, Mahmeleh District, Khonj County, Iran. At the 2006 census, its population was 418, in 78 families.
