= Honguyeh =

Honguyeh هنگويه
- Village
- Location within Iran
- Coordinates: 27°48′46″N 53°19′21″E
- Country: Iran
- Province: Fars
- County: Khonj
- Bakhsh: Mahmeleh
- Rural District: Mahmeleh

Population (2006)
  - Total: 190
- Time zone: UTC+3:30 (IRST)
  - Summer (DST): UTC+4:30 (IRDT)

Honguyeh (Persian: هنگويه, also Romanized as Hongūyeh and Hangooyeh; also known as Hengenūyeh, Hengū, and Hongū) is a village in Mahmeleh Rural District, Mahmeleh District, Khonj County, Fars province, Iran. At the 2006 census, its population was 190, in 33 families.
