= Hammami, Iran =

Hammami حمامي
- Village
- Location within Iran
- Coordinates: 28°05′52″N 53°24′18″E
- Country: Iran
- Province: Fars
- County: Khonj
- Bakhsh: Central
- Rural District: Seyfabad

Population (2006)
  - Total: 51
- Time zone: UTC+3:30 (IRST)
  - Summer (DST): UTC+4:30 (IRDT)

Hammami (Persian: حمامي, also Romanized as Ḩammāmī) is a village in Seyfabad Rural District, in the Central District of Khonj County, Fars province, Iran. At the 2006 census, its population was 51, in 11 families.
