= Haftvan =

Haftvan or Haftavan or Haftovan (Persian: هفتوان) may refer to:

- Haftavan, Fars
- Haftvan, West Azerbaijan
- Haftvaneh
