= Kurdeh, Khonj =

Village in Fars province, Iran

Kurdeh Persian: كورده
- Village
- Location within Iran
- Coordinates: 28°02′45″N 52°30′47″E
- Country: Iran
- Province: Fars
- County: Khonj
- District: Mahmeleh
- Rural District: Baghan

Population (2016)
  - Total: 2,180
- Time zone: UTC+3:30 (IRST)

Kurdeh (Persian: كورده) (Note: Also romanized as Kūrdeh) is a village in Baghan Rural District of Mahmeleh District, Khonj County, Fars province, Iran.

== Demographics ==
=== Population ===
At the time of the 2006 National Census, the village's population was 1,736 in 357 households. The following census in 2011 counted 1,999 people in 480 households. The 2016 census measured the population of the village as 2,180 people in 572 households. It was the most populous village in its rural district.
