= Chatus =

Chatus may refer to:

- Chah Tus, village in Iran
- Chatus (wine grape), wine grape variety from France
