= Karajan (disambiguation) =

Karajan may refer to:

- Karajan (surname), a surname
- Herbert von Karajan (1908–1989), an Austrian orchestra and opera conductor
- Herbert von Karajan Music Prize, an annual music award
- 6973 Karajan, an asteroid

== See also ==
- Karayan (disambiguation)
