= Hammami =

Hammami may refer to:

== People ==
- Chadi Hammami (born 1986), Tunisian footballer
- Hamma Hammami (born 1952), Tunisian communist
- Said Hammami (died 1978), Palestinian politician, diplomat and journalist
- Tahar Hammami (1947–2009), Tunisian poet

== Places ==
- Hammami, Iran, in Fars Province

== See also ==
- El Hammamy
