= Chah Tus =

Village in Fars province, Iran

Chah Tus Persian: چاه طوس
- Village
- Location within Iran
- Coordinates: 27°46′06″N 53°22′55″E
- Country: Iran
- Province: Fars
- County: Khonj
- District: Mahmeleh
- Rural District: Mahmeleh

Population (2016)
  - Total: 1,497
- Time zone: UTC+3:30 (IRST)

Chah Tus (Persian: چاه طوس) (Note: Also romanized as Chah Toos and Chāh Ţūs; also known as Chād Ţūs, Chātūs, and Shatū) is a village in, and the capital of, Mahmeleh Rural District of Mahmeleh District, Khonj County, Fars province, Iran. The previous capital of the rural district was the village of Mahmeleh, now a city.

== Demographics ==
=== Population ===
At the time of the 2006 National Census, the village's population was 795 in 164 households. The following census in 2011 counted 1,339 people in 309 households. The 2016 census measured the population of the village as 1,497 people in 404 households. It was the most populous village in its rural district.
