= Karajan (surname) =

Karajan, or Caragiani, Caraiannis, Karagianni, Karagiannis, Karayiannis, Karagianis, is a Greek surname. This last name, like several other Ottoman-era ones, contains the Turkish language prefix 'kara' in reference to either someone's dark complexion, or the archaic Ottoman-era meaning of 'brave'. Specifically it means "black (or brave) John".

Notable persons with that surname include:

- Eftychia Karagianni (born 1973), Greek water polo player
- Eliette von Karajan (born 1932), French fashion model
- Georgios Karayiannis, Greek Army officer
- Herbert von Karajan (1908–1989), Austrian conductor, great-grandson of Theodor von Karajan
- Ioan D. Caragiani (1841–1921), Romanian folklorist
- Konstantinos Karagiannis (born 2000), Cypriot footballer
- Martha Karagianni (1939–2022), Greek actress
- Maurine Karagianis (born 1949 or 1950), Canadian politician
- Vaios Karagiannis (born 1968), Greek footballer
- Peter Karrie (born 1946), (Full name Peter Karagianis), Welsh Singer & TV show host

== See also ==
- Karayan (disambiguation)
