= Kurdeh =

Kurdeh or Kavardeh (Persian: كورده) may refer to:

- Kurdeh, Khonj, Fars Province
- Kurdeh, Larestan, Fars Province
- Kurdeh, Razavi Khorasan
