= Hengu =

Hengu or Hongu (Persian: هنگو) in Iran may refer to:

- Hengu, Fars
- Hongu, Hormozgan
- Hengu, Kerman
