= Karian, Iran =

Karian or Kariyan or Kareyan or Karyan or Karayan (Persian: كريان) may refer to:

- Karyan, Fars
- Karyan Rural District, an administrative division of Juyom County, Fars province
- Karian, Hormozgan
- Karyan, Kermanshah
- Karian, alternate name of Sarab-e Karian
- Karyan, Markazi
- Karian Rural District, in Hormozgan province

== See also ==
- Karajan (disambiguation)
