= El Hammamy =

El Hammamy, Elhammamy, El-Hammamy or ElHammamy (Arabic: الهمامي) is an Arabic surname. Notable people with the surname include:

- Hania El Hammamy (born 2000), Egyptian squash player
- Karim El Hammamy (born 1995), Egyptian squash player

== See also ==
- Hammami (disambiguation)
