= Mahmeleh =

City in Fars province, Iran

Mahmeleh Persian: محمله
- City
- Location within Iran
- Coordinates: 27°46′51″N 53°03′28″E
- Country: Iran
- Province: Fars
- County: Khonj
- District: Mahmeleh

Population (2016)
  - Total: 612
- Time zone: UTC+3:30 (IRST)

Mahmeleh (Persian: محمله) (Note: Also romanized as Maḩmeleh; also known as Makhmaleh, Mohīleh, and Mūhīmīleh) is a city in, and the capital of, Mahmeleh District of Khonj County, Fars province, Iran. As a village, it was the capital of Mahmeleh Rural District until its capital was transferred to the village of Chah Tus.

== Demographics ==
=== Population ===
At the time of the 2006 National Census, Mahmeleh's population was 537 in 126 households, when it was a village in Mahmeleh Rural District. The following census in 2011 counted 560 people in 152 households. The 2016 census measured the population of the village as 612 people in 174 households.

After the census, Mahmeleh was elevated to the status of a city.
