= Zanguiyeh-ye Olya =

Zanguiyeh-ye Olya زنگوييه عليا
- Village
- Location within Iran
- Coordinates: 30°56′27″N 56°37′49″E
- Country: Iran
- Province: Kerman
- County: Zarand
- Bakhsh: Central
- Rural District: Sarbanan

Population (2006)
  - Total: 18
- Time zone: UTC+3:30 (IRST)
  - Summer (DST): UTC+4:30 (IRDT)

Zanguiyeh-ye Olya (Persian: زنگوييه عليا, also Romanized as Zangūīyeh-ye ‘Olyā and Zangoeeyeh-ye ‘Olyā) is a village in Sarbanan Rural District, in the Central District of Zarand County, Kerman Province, Iran. At the 2006 census, its population was 18, in 7 families.
