= Karyan, Kermanshah =

Karyan كريان
- Village
- Location within Iran
- Coordinates: 33°53′13″N 47°01′39″E
- Country: Iran
- Province: Kermanshah
- County: Kermanshah
- Bakhsh: Firuzabad
- Rural District: Jalalvand

Population (2006)
  - Total: 85
- Time zone: UTC+3:30 (IRST)
  - Summer (DST): UTC+4:30 (IRDT)

Karyan (Persian: كريان, also Romanized as Karyān) is a village in Jalalvand Rural District, Firuzabad District, Kermanshah County, Kermanshah Province, Iran. At the 2006 census, its population was 85, in 23 families.
