= Dar Zanguiyeh =

Dar Zanguiyeh درزنگوييه
- Village
- Location within Iran
- Coordinates: 28°57′14″N 57°53′51″E
- Country: Iran
- Province: Kerman
- County: Jiroft
- Bakhsh: Jebalbarez
- Rural District: Maskun

Population (2006)
  - Total: 154
- Time zone: UTC+3:30 (IRST)
  - Summer (DST): UTC+4:30 (IRDT)

Dar Zanguiyeh (Persian: درزنگوييه, also Romanized as Dar Zangū’īyeh; also known as Dar Zangū and Zangū’īyeh) is a village in Maskun Rural District, Jebalbarez District, Jiroft County, Kerman province, Iran. At the 2006 census, its population was 154, in 32 families.
