= Khosrow Qashqai =

Iranian politician and Qashqai tribal leader

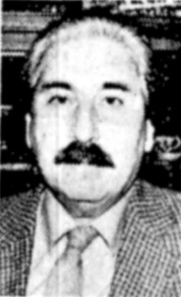
- Qashqai in 1979

Member of Parliament
- In office Credentials rejected in 1980
- Constituency: Eqlid
- In office 27 April 1952 – 16 August 1953
- Constituency: Firouzabad
- In office 25 April 1950 – 19 February 1952
- Constituency: Firouzabad
- In office 12 June 1947 – 28 July 1949
- Constituency: Firouzabad

Personal details
- Born: c. 1921 Firuzabad County, Iran
- Died: 1 October 1982 (aged 60–61) Firuzabad County, Iran
- Party: National Front
- Other political affiliations: Democrat Party (1946–48)

Khosrow Qashqai (Persian: خسرو قشقایی; c. 1921 – 1982) was an Iranian politician and a Qashqai tribal leader.

Qashqai was a secular nationalist, and an opponent of Pahlavi dynasty. Historian Mark J. Gasiorowski describes him as "very pro-American".

== Career ==
Qashqai joined Democrat Party of Ahmad Qavam upon establishment, and was elected to the parliament in 1947 election. In the next term, he was elected to the parliament as an independent. and during the 17th term, he joined the National Movement fraction after 1952 election. After 1953 coup d'état took place, he was forced into an exile that lasted from 1954 to 1979, when the Iranian revolution happened.

Qashqai had close ties to the Central Intelligence Agency (CIA) during the 1950s, and his cryptonym was "SDROTTER/4". He re-established connections with the American agency in 1978 again and in January 1979, he visited the Department of State. Following his return to Iran, Qashqai regularly met with CIA officers in Tehran. He requested them to help him establish a newspaper, but the CIA saw no use in this matter and apparently refused the offer. Instead, the urged Qashqai to continue 'full-scale political activity' and strengthening his ties to various players in order to gather intelligence and influencing them.

In 1980 parliamentary election, Qashqai won a ticket supported by the National Front. However, his credentials were rejected due to his American connections.

== Prosecution and execution ==
Qashqai was arrested after the 1980 presidential election, when the Muslim Student Followers of the Imam's Line released documents regarding his involvement with the Americans. He escaped from prison and fled to Fars province to organize armed tribesmen for an insurgency. They were suppressed by the Islamic Revolutionary Guard Corps, and he was arrested in April 1982. He was executed on 1 October 1982.
