= Tang-e Narak Rural District =

Rural district in Fars province, Iran

Tang-e Narak Rural District Persian: دهستان تنگ نارك
- Rural District
- Location within Iran
- Coordinates: 27°52′43″N 53°36′44″E
- Country: Iran
- Province: Fars
- County: Khonj
- District: Central
- Capital: Bigherd

Population (2016)
  - Total: 3,523
- Time zone: UTC+3:30 (IRST)

Tang-e Narak Rural District (Persian: دهستان تنگ نارك) is in the Central District of Khonj County, Fars province, Iran. Its capital is the village of Bigherd.

Old Tang-e Narak

== Demographics ==
=== Population ===
At the time of the 2006 National Census, the rural district's population was 3,341 in 568 households. There were 3,693 inhabitants in 848 households at the following census of 2011. The 2016 census measured the population of the rural district as 3,523 in 909 households. The most populous of its 21 villages was Bigherd, with 2,593 people.
