= Khonj =

City in Fars province, Iran

Khonj Persian: خنج
- City
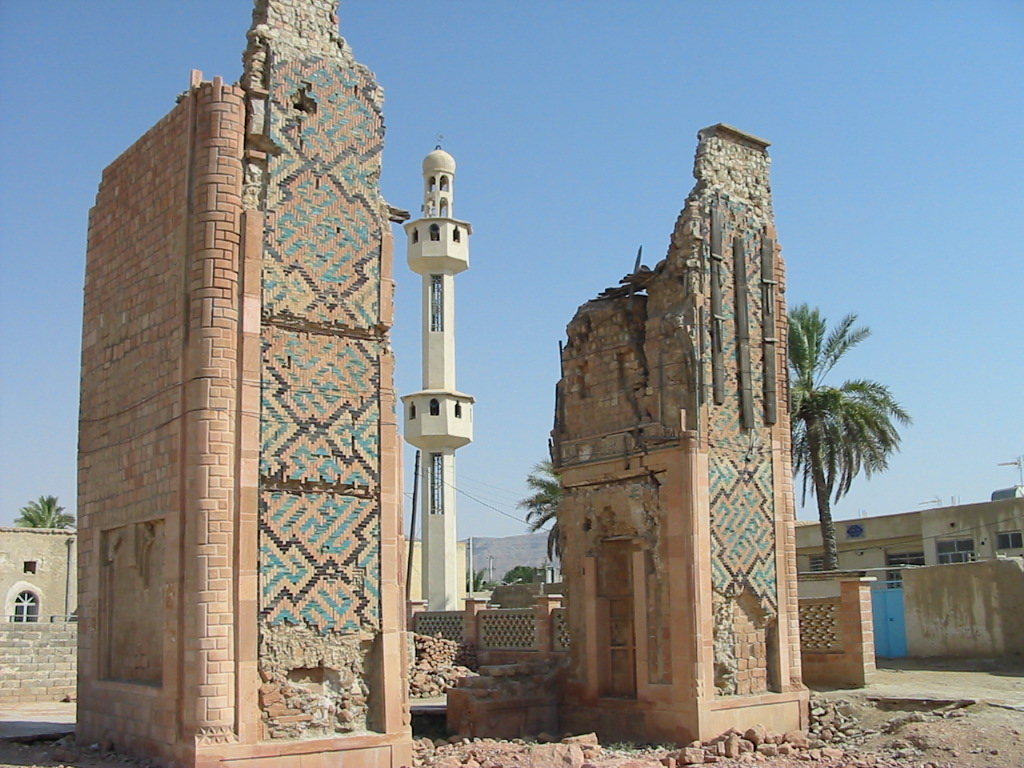
- Dargah (gate) is an entrance to Shaykh Haji Mohammad complex, including the mosque and the shrine

- Location within Iran
- Coordinates: 27°53′23″N 53°25′51″E
- Country: Iran
- Province: Fars
- County: Khonj
- District: Central
- Elevation: 670 m (2,200 ft)

Population (2016)
  - Total: 19,217
- Time zone: UTC+3:30 (IRST)

Khonj (Persian: خنج) (Note: Also known as Khunj and Khunji) is a city in the Central District of Khonj County, Fars province, Iran, serving as capital of both the county and the district. The city is at an altitude of 670 metres (2,200 ft). Khonj was traditionally part of the region of Irahistan.

== Demographics ==
=== Ethnicity ===
The people of Khonj are native Persians of Zoroastrian origin who converted to Sunni Islam.

=== Population ===
At the time of the 2006 National Census, the city's population was 19,347 in 3,353 households. The following census in 2011 counted 18,792 people in 3,884 households. The 2016 census measured the population of the city as 19,217 people in 4,665 households.

== Overview ==
Khonj is 270 kilometres (170 mi) south of Shiraz. Its history goes back to 2,000 years, and Khonjis were known to be followers of Zoroastrianism. Khonjis refer to themselves as Khodmooni, a term literally meaning "part of ourselves" but figuratively used to refer to people from Gerash, Lar, Evaz, Khonj and other neighboring cities that share the Achomi language. The ancient names for Khonj were Hong and Konj (corner in Persian) and over time it has changed to Khonj. Its residents are Sunni, unlike most of Iran, and are famous as traders. The city has historical significance as it was the home for many Muslim scholars and great architects before and after Islam. Ibn Battuta, the great Moroccan explorer, wrote about his travels to Khonj in great detail.

The agriculture in Khonj is primarily wheat, oat, and dates. Khonj has the least amount of rainfall than any other part of Fars.

== Climate ==
The city of Khonj is located at 27.890 degrees east latitude and 53.437 degrees north of the Greenwich meridian. It is bounded by Lamerd and Mohr counties from the south, Qir, Kazerun and Jahrom counties from the north, Larestan county from the northeast, and Evaz county from the east. Khonj is located at the beginning of a vast plain in the southern Zagros mountains. Its distance to the Persian Gulf is 90 km and Its height is 1044 meters. Khonj faces hot weather most days of the year. But at the same time, it is one of the rainiest areas of Fars province.

== Historical monuments ==
The city of Khonj is considered one of the most significant historical cities of Fars province with more than 20 historical works from different periods that have been registered in the Iran National Heritage List. The works that have been identified so far include the pottery period of the Neolithic and the first millennium BC (Tel Khandaq, Kurde village, Tell Gap, Baghan village, Tell Korki and the six sites of Garmasht village) until today.
