= Henguiyeh, Sirjan =

Henguiyeh هنگوييه
- Village
- Location within Iran
- Coordinates: 29°51′39″N 55°46′13″E
- Country: Iran
- Province: Kerman
- County: Sirjan
- Bakhsh: Pariz
- Rural District: Pariz

Population (2006)
  - Total: 9
- Time zone: UTC+3:30 (IRST)
  - Summer (DST): UTC+4:30 (IRDT)

Henguiyeh (Persian: هنگوييه, also Romanized as Hengū’īyeh; also known as Hengū) is a village in Pariz Rural District, Pariz District, Sirjan County, Kerman Province, Iran. At the 2006 census, its population was 9, in 4 families.
