= Georgios Karayiannis =

Georgios Karayiannis was an officer of the Greek Army. Having retired with the rank of General, he was approached on 18 April 1964 by his former colleague General George Grivas and offered the leadership of the newly formed Greek Cypriot Cypriot National Guard, which post Karayiannis accepted. From April to August 1964 Karayiannis commanded and organised the Cypriot National Guard, whose stated mission was to defend the island against possible Turkish military invasion, and to counter the paramilitary forces of the Turkish Cypriot group known as Turkish Resistance Organization or TMT.

Grivas arrived in Cyprus himself on 10 June 1964 and used the popularity he gained in Cyprus and Greece during the EOKA era to coerce the governments of Greece and Cyprus into appointing him supreme military commander of Cyprus. On 22 July Grivas set himself up in an office at the National Guard headquarters and began to issue orders directly to National Guard units. This incensed Karayiannis who submitted his resignation, which was not accepted.

On 4 July negotiations on the Cyprus dispute began in Geneva between representatives of the United States, Greek and Turkish governments, with the presence of the United Nations. Special advisor to the US representation was Dean Acheson, and those US proposals eventually became known as the "Acheson plan". Karayiannis and Grivas were recalled to Athens on 5 August to confer with the Greek government. Karayiannis reports that he and Grivas were counselled by Minister of Defense Petros Garoufalias to exercise all restraint, as Enosis was imminent, and to seek the counsel of the Greek government before any action which might lead to escalation. Grivas was to return to Cyprus on 6 August, and Karayiannis on 7 August.

While returning to Cyprus on 7 August on board the Athens-Nicosia airliner, Karayiannis saw shell bursts and smoke in the Kokkina area. On arrival he headed immediately for the Headquarters of the National Guard which he found on full war alert. General Grivas informed Karayiannis that the Swedish battalion of the UN Forces in Cyprus had abandoned their positions on the hill known as Akoni in the Kokkina area on 6 August, that Cypriot National Guard units which took their place came under fire from units of the TMT stationed on the nearby hill known as Lourovouno, and that therefore Grivas had ordered an attack on Lourovouno for the morning of 7 August. Karayiannis reports that he later found out that the attack on Lourovouno had been ordered without the Greek government having been informed, and that Grivas had misled Makarios and the Council of Ministers of the Republic of Cyprus into thinking he would obtain authorisation from Greece before acting. Karayiannis was once more incensed at Grivas. He became even more incensed when he found out that the attack had been badly organised, so that it had only started at 3:30pm instead of the planned time in the morning, and therefore failed to achieve its objectives by nightfall.

During that night Grivas ordered a large number of forces into the Kokkina area and ordered an attack for the next morning. Lourovouno was taken by 07:45 on the morning of 8 August. Still without authorisation from Greece, but with the support of Makarios, Grivas escalated operations, with the objective of taking over the entire Kokkina enclave. At 10:05, Grivas was ordered by signal from the General National Defense Staff of Greece to cease offensive operations at that time, which order he ignored. Later the same day, Greek Prime Minister Georgios Papandreou sent a message to Makarios expressing his disapproval of the latter's initiatives. While Grivas went to the field of operations, Karayiannis, who was insisting that the orders of the Greek government to suspend offensive operations be obeyed, remained at the Headquarters of the National Guard in Nicosia.

At 16:15 on the afternoon of 8 August, the Turkish Air Force attacked the Cypriot National Guard formations in the Kokkina area, against no significant resistance as the National Guard operated no aircraft and had very rudimentary anti-aircraft capability. Grivas, who was present in the area, did all he could to prevent the panicking National Guardsmen from abandoning their positions. When the air attacks ceased two hours later, Grivas returned to his office at the Headquarters of the National Guard in Nicosia.

At 20:00 the Council of Ministers of the Republic of Cyprus convened, with the presence of Makarios, Grivas and Karayiannis. Grivas proposed, and the Council agreed to, an all-out night attack to take over the Kokkina enclave. Karayiannis intervened, asking Grivas whether he had any idea, if such an order were issued, as to when and how it would be carried out by units in the field. Grivas was forced to admit that he could not order an attack for earlier than the afternoon of the next day, 9 August. Karayiannis also protested that the Government of the Republic of Cyprus was undertaking offensive initiatives without counsel with the government of Greece, despite prior agreements. The Minister of Interior and Defense of the Republic of Cyprus, Polycarpos Georgadjis, replied by submitting his resignation because, though Karayiannis was leader of the Cypriot National Guard, he was taking orders from Minister of Defense Garoufalias in Greece rather than Georkadjis. The resignation was not accepted.

After 21:00 Grivas returned to his office at the Headquarters of the Cypriot National Guard and, in the presence of Georkadjis, Karayiannis and others, submitted his resignation, describing himself as a "renegade" for not obeying the orders of the Greek government. He then left his office. Karayiannis immediately ordered all units to regroup, maintain positions and await further orders.

At 10:00 on the morning of 9 August, the Turkish Air Force resumed its operations in the Kokkina area and extended them to civilian targets in the region. Napalm attacks on the villages of Pyrgos, Pigenia, Pachyammos, Pomos and the town of Polis Chrysochous killed 53 and injured 125 civilians. The Turkish Air Force also mistakenly attacked Kokkina itself. The Council of Ministers of the Republic of Cyprus, in an emergency session with Makarios presiding, decided to issue an ultimatum to the Turkish government warning that unless air attacks stopped, a general attack on Turkish Cypriot villages by the Cypriot National Guard would be ordered, and asked General Karayiannis to select two villages for destruction in case the ultimatum was not heeded. Karayiannis reports that he refused the order, saying that he was an army officer and not an executioner of innocent people.

During the night of 9 August the military crisis was defused by an intervention of the UN Security Council. All units were ordered to stand down. Only then did Grivas return to his office, having been absent throughout the critical events of August 9. He announced that he was assuming supreme military command of Cyprus once more. Karayiannis reported to him on events during the day and preparations to face a possible landing by the Turkish army, whereupon Grivas instructed Karayiannis not to move a single platoon without his personal approval.

Before, and during, the Kokkina crisis, Karayiannis found himself charged with duties to both the government of the Republic of Cyprus and of Greece, which became contradictory because of the lack of agreement between the two governments. He also found that Polycarpos Georgadjis and George Grivas interfered with the discharge of his duties. He made his position clear in the account of events he submitted to the government of the Republic of Cyprus immediately after the Kokkina events. Immediately afterwards, he submitted a letter of resignation to Makarios III. Makarios asked Karayiannis to reconsider his decision, which Karayiannis promised to do after returning to Greece to consult with the Greek government. Presumably, Makarios wished Karayiannis to stay on as Chief of Staff of the Cypriot National Guard as a counterweight to Supreme Military Commander Grivas, who Makarios was finding increasingly difficult to deal with. Karayiannis, however, after his return to Greece and consultation with the Greek government, wrote Makarios another letter upholding his decision to resign. Makarios III wrote Karayiannis accepting his resignation and thanking him for his services.

In June 1965 Karayiannis began a series of articles on his time in Cyprus in the Greek newspaper National Herald, in which he related his account of the facts and accused Grivas of military incompetence, irrational behaviour and psychological weakness. That series of articles, and his report on the Kokkina crisis submitted to the Government of the Republic of Cyprus immediately after events, provide an interesting insight into an important era in the Cyprus dispute and into the personality and actions of George Grivas.
