= Khanbaghi, East Azerbaijan =

Khanbaghi خان باغي
- Village
- Location within Iran
- Coordinates: 39°08′30″N 47°11′19″E
- Country: Iran
- Province: East Azerbaijan
- County: Kaleybar
- Bakhsh: Central
- Rural District: Mulan

Population (2006)
  - Total: 123
- Time zone: UTC+3:30 (IRST)
  - Summer (DST): UTC+4:30 (IRDT)

Khanbaghi (Persian: خان باغي, also Romanized as Khānbāghī; also known as Khānmāghī) is a village in Mulan Rural District, in the Central District of Kaleybar County, East Azerbaijan Province, Iran. At the 2006 census, its population was 123, in 24 families.
