= Takhteh, Kurdistan =

Takhteh تەختە
- Village
- Location within Iran
- Coordinates: 35°12′50″N 46°50′42″E
- Country: Iran
- Province: Kurdistan
- County: Sanandaj
- Bakhsh: Central
- Rural District: Zhavarud-e Sharqi

Population (2006)
  - Total: 677
- Time zone: UTC+3:30 (IRST)
  - Summer (DST): UTC+4:30 (IRDT)

Takhteh also Takhta (Kurdish: تەختە, Persian: تخته) is a village in Zhavarud-e Sharqi Rural District, in the Central District of Sanandaj County, Kurdistan Province, Iran. At the 2006 census, its population was 677, in 186 families. The village is populated by Kurds.
