= Iivari's quick bridge =

Finnish floating footbridge

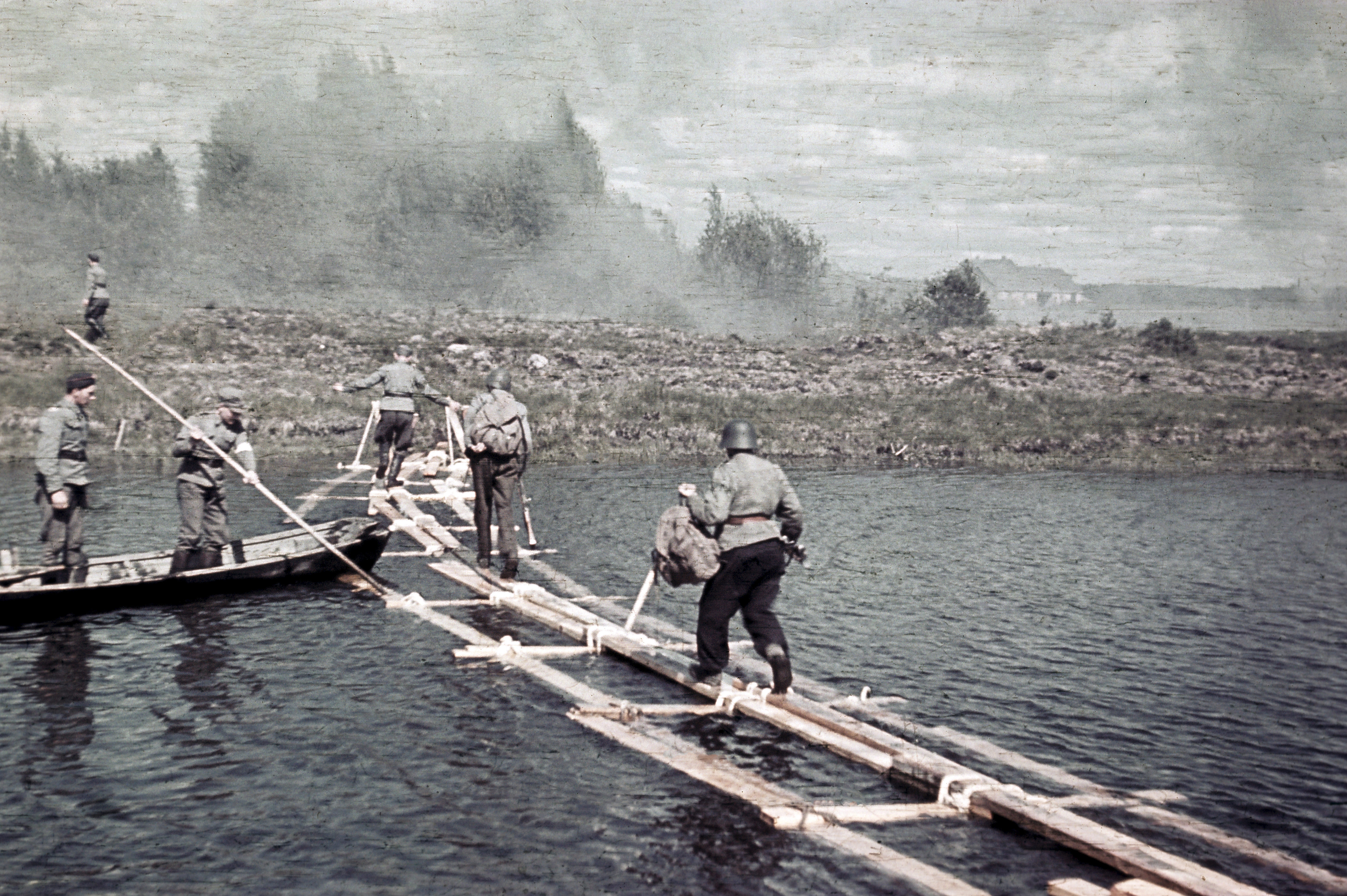
Soldiers crossing an Iivari's quick bridge, training during the Continuation War

Iivari's quick bridge (Finnish: Iivarin pikasilta) or originally pikasilta m/32 is a model of floating footbridge designed by, and named after, Iivari Kauranen. Proposed in 1933, its ease of construction from various wooden materials made it a step up from earlier models, and is still in use by the Finnish Defense Forces.

== History ==
=== Design ===
Iivari's quick bridge was proposed by Kauranen in a 1933 article in Suomen Sotilasaikakausilehti.

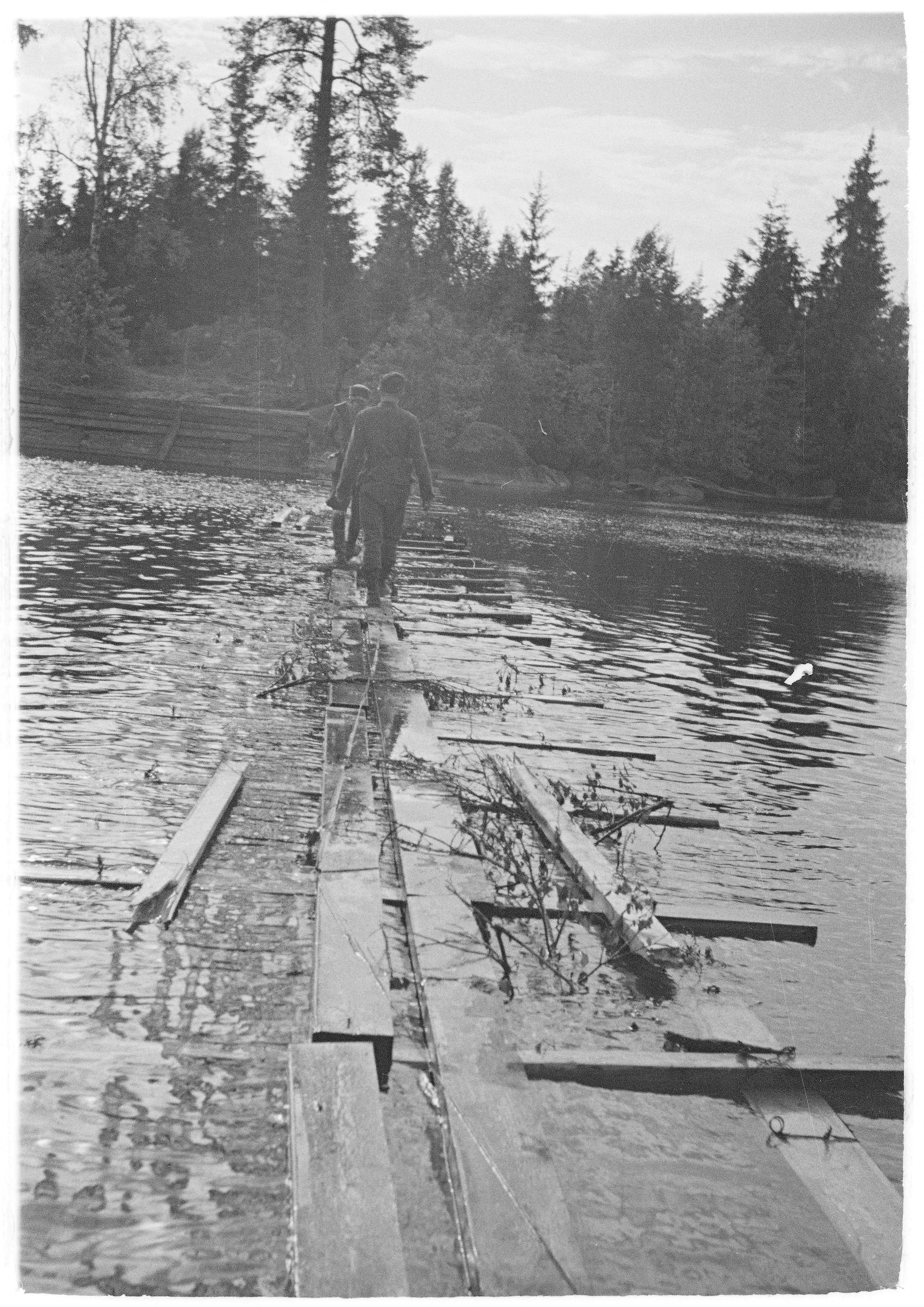
An Iivari's quick bridge in use near Äyräpää, 28 August 1944

The model was introduced to replace earlier French and German designs, both which had their own drawbacks. Iivari's quick bridge was partly based on the French model. One advantage compared to the earlier models was the ability to construct it from various wooden materials, acquired on site if needed. The joints can also be fixed using materials ranging from rope and nails to tree roots.

Because the buoyancy is created by supports that run cross-stream, the bridge is not suitable for strong streams, and thus was adopted alongside the log quick bridge designed by Eero-Eetu Saarinen, among other bridge types. The bridge is usable in waters slower than 1 m/s and less than 50 m wide.

=== Usage ===
As the bridge is easy to teach to regular infantry, and the material needed for it were readily available in Finland, it greatly eased water crossings, and let engineers focus on large water crossings.

The Iivari's quick bridge enabled the textbook tactic, by the Winter War, for water crossings of having the assault force cross using it, with supporting elements that used trucks utilizing boat pontoon bridges (ruuhisilta).

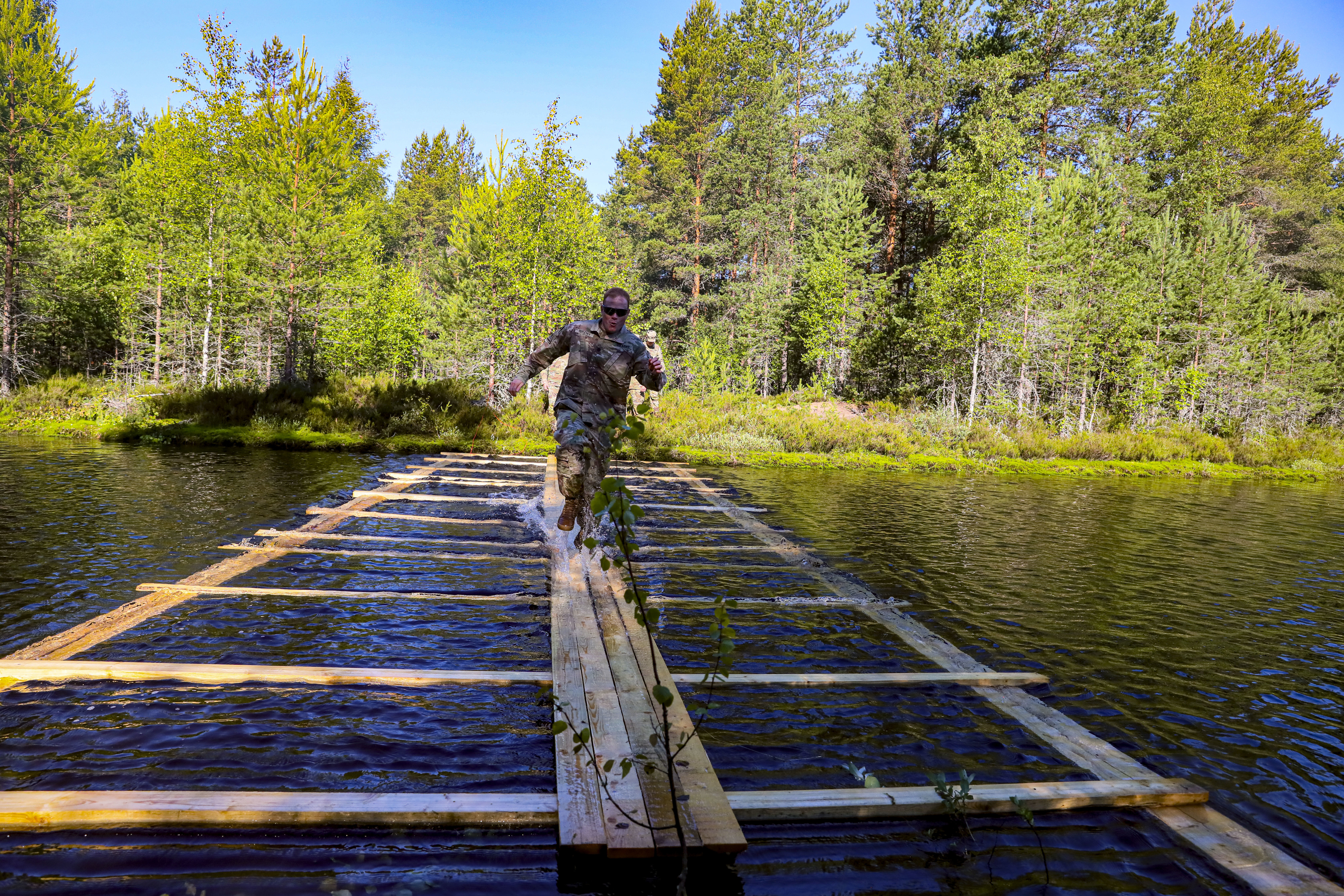
Quick bridge in 2022

The usage of Iivari's quick bridge continued post-war, with it being a part of infantry water training in the 1980s. Coastal troops trained it up to the 1990s when the six-month training period forced a focus on training more fundamental skills. As of 2019, engineer troops occasionally still use Iivari's quick bridge, and instructions for its construction and use is included in the 2024 survival manual of the Finnish Defence Forces.

== In culture ==
Captain Arvo Pitkänen painted a painting called "Iivarin pikasilta", depicting a crossing using the bridge, in 1977.
