= Smārde =

Village in Latvia

- Village
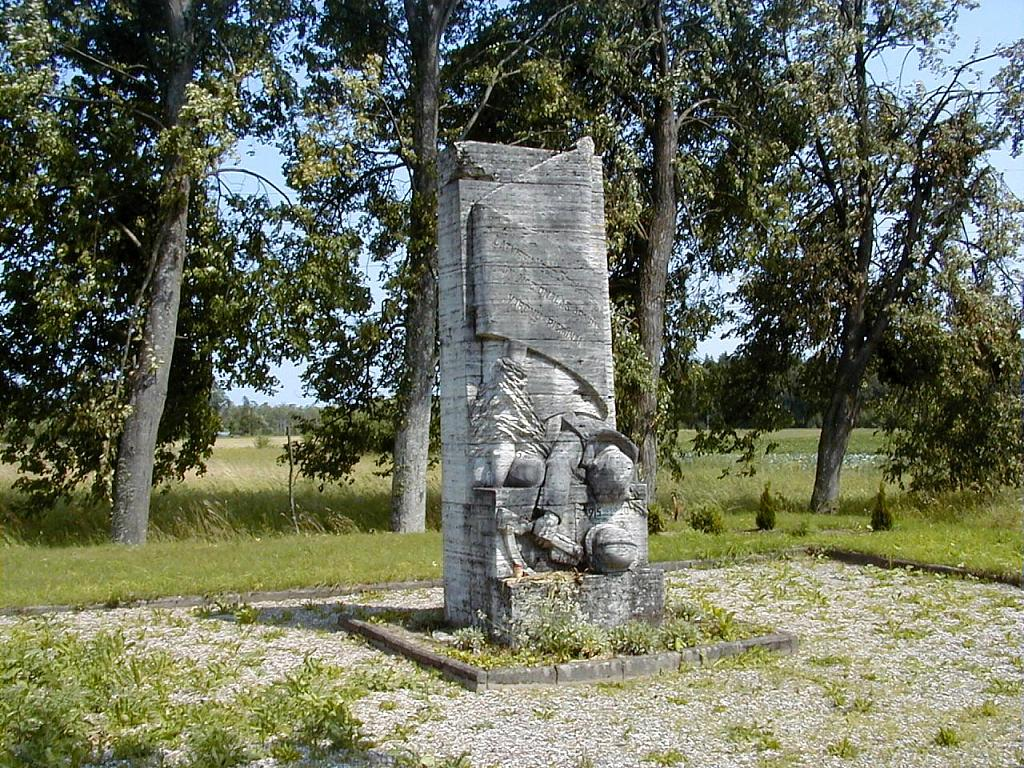
- World War I memorial in Smārde

- Smārde's location in Latvia
- Coordinates: 56°57′11.11″N 23°20′14.15″E
- Country: Latvia
- Municipality: Tukums
- Parish: Smārde
- First time mentioned: 1253

Population (2005)
  - Total: 684

Smārde (German: Schmarden) is a village in the Smārde Parish of Tukums Municipality in the Courland region of Latvia.

In 1877, it was one of the 10 towns where more railway stations were opened.

The Battle of Schmarden was fought in Smārde on 25 July 1916.
