= Mount Hongū =

Mount Hongū (Hongū-san or Hongū-yama in Japanese) may refer to:

- Mount Hongū (Aichi)
- Mount Hongū (Ayabe)
