= Takhteh, Gilan =

Takhteh تخته
- Village
- Location within Iran
- Coordinates: 37°57′36″N 48°52′02″E
- Country: Iran
- Province: Gilan
- County: Talesh
- Bakhsh: Kargan Rud
- Rural District: Lisar

Population (2016)
  - Total: 30
- Time zone: UTC+3:30 (IRST)

Takhteh (Persian: تخته) is a village in Lisar Rural District, Kargan Rud District, Talesh County, Gilan Province, Iran.

At the time of the 2006 National Census, the village's population was 113 in 30 households. The following census in 2011 counted 31 people in 8 households. The 2016 census measured the population of the village as 30 people in 8 households.
