= Sarab-e Karian =

Sarab-e Karian سراب كريان
- Village
- Location within Iran
- Coordinates: 33°53′12″N 47°01′42″E
- Country: Iran
- Province: Kermanshah
- County: Kermanshah
- Bakhsh: Firuzabad
- Rural District: Jalalvand

Population (2006)
  - Total: 149
- Time zone: UTC+3:30 (IRST)
  - Summer (DST): UTC+4:30 (IRDT)

Sarab-e Karian (Persian: سراب كريان, also Romanized as Sarāb-e Karīān; also known as Karayān, Kareyān, and Karīān) is a village in Jalalvand Rural District, Firuzabad District, Kermanshah County, Kermanshah Province, Iran. At the 2006 census, its population was 149, in 35 families.
