= Unio Sarlin =

Finnish sport shooter and officer

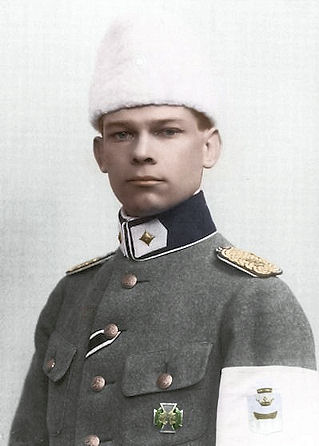

Personal information
- Born: 6 January 1893 Helsinki, Finland
- Died: 19 March 1981 (aged 88) Helsinki, Finland

Sport
- Sport: Sports shooting

Unio Bernhard Sarlin (6 January 1893 – 19 March 1981) was a Finnish sport shooter who competed in the 1924 Summer Olympics. He was also a member of the Jäger Movement and an important army officer. In 1924 he finished seventh in the 25 m rapid fire pistol competition.
