= Hakku (magazine) =

Magazine of Finnish military engineers

- Editor-in-Chief: Ari Pakarinen
- Managing Editor: Seppo Suhonen
- Categories: Military magazine
- Frequency: Quarterly
- Format: A4
- Circulation: 4,500
- First issue: 1923
- Company: Pioneeriaselajin Liitto ry
- Country: Finland
- Language: Finnish
- Website: https://www.pioneeriaselajinliitto.fi/hakku-lehti/

Hakku (lit. 'pickaxe') is the specialist magazine of Finnish military engineers published by Pioneeriaselajin Liitto ry, and is the oldest continuously published military branch and unit magazine in Finland, first published in 1923. The magazine includes information about the past, current, and future of military engineering, such as the structure of foreign mines, along reports of trainings and events.

The first number, published on 2 December 1923, was machine typed, only read at special events and circulated in the Koria engineer battalion's Soldiers' Home canteen in relation to the National Literature Week. In 1925 it became printed and began being issued monthly. Since 1926 in has been orderable outside military garrisons. In 1933 it became the magazine of Finnish military engineers, instead of only the Koria engineer battalion.

The 100th anniversary edition included greetings from Finnish Minister of Defence, Antti Häkkänen, Chief of Defence, General Timo Kivinen, and Chief of Military Chaplains, field bishop Pekka Asikainen.

In 1938 the magazine had a circulation of over 3,500 with 66 lifetime subscribers. In 1974 the publication frequency was fixed as quarterly. In 2026 the print runs were 4,500 each.

== Recognizions ==
The magazine has received the following recognizions:

- Finnish Defence Forces golden medal of merit: 2003
- The Defence Guilds’ Federation of Finland:
  - Years best guild magazine: 2013, 2017
  - Special recognition of excellence: 2015
  - Recognition of excellence: 1997, 2003, 2011, 2012, 2014, 2015, 2016
