= Baghan Rural District =

Rural district in Fars province, Iran

Baghan Rural District Persian: دهستان باغان
- Rural District
- Location within Iran
- Coordinates: 28°03′14″N 52°49′24″E
- Country: Iran
- Province: Fars
- County: Khonj
- District: Mahmeleh
- Capital: Baghan

Population (2016)
  - Total: 4,173
- Time zone: UTC+3:30 (IRST)

Baghan Rural District (Persian: دهستان باغان) is in Mahmeleh District of Khonj County, Fars province, Iran. Its capital is the village of Baghan.

== Demographics ==
=== Population ===
At the time of the 2006 National Census, the rural district's population was 3,274 in 664 households. There were 3,957 inhabitants in 897 households at the following census of 2011. The 2016 census measured the population of the rural district as 4,173 in 1,137 households. The most populous of its 23 villages was Kurdeh, with 2,180 people.
