= Mahmeleh Rural District =

Rural district in Fars province, Iran

Mahmeleh Rural District Persian: دهستان محمله
- Rural District
- Location within Iran
- Coordinates: 27°49′56″N 53°00′01″E
- Country: Iran
- Province: Fars
- County: Khonj
- District: Mahmeleh
- Capital: Chah Tus

Population (2016)
  - Total: 5,452
- Time zone: UTC+3:30 (IRST)

Mahmeleh Rural District (Persian: دهستان محمله) is in Mahmeleh District of Khonj County, Fars province, Iran. Its capital is the village of Chah Tus. The previous capital of the rural district was the village of Mahmeleh, now a city.

== Demographics ==
=== Population ===
At the time of the 2006 National Census, the rural district's population was 3,925 in 817 households. There were 5,041 inhabitants in 1,228 households at the following census of 2011. The 2016 census measured the population of the rural district as 5,452 in 1,493 households. The most populous of its 58 villages was Chah Tus, with 1,497 people.
