= Mahmeleh District =

District in Fars province, Iran

Mahmeleh District Persian: بخش محمله
- District
- Location within Iran
- Coordinates: 27°58′56″N 52°57′33″E
- Country: Iran
- Province: Fars
- County: Khonj
- Capital: Mahmeleh

Population (2016)
  - Total: 9,625
- Time zone: UTC+3:30 (IRST)

Mahmeleh District (Persian: بخش محمله) is in Khonj County, Fars province, Iran. Its capital is the city of Mahmeleh.

== History ==
After the 2016 National Census, the village of Mahmeleh was elevated to the status of a city.

== Demographics ==
=== Population ===
At the time of the 2006 National Census, the district's population was 7,199 in 1,481 households. The following census in 2011 counted 8,998 people in 2,125 households. The 2016 census measured the population of the district as 9,625 inhabitants in 2,630 households.

=== Administrative divisions ===
Mahmeleh District Population
Administrative Divisions	2006	2011	2016
Baghan RD	3,274	3,957	4,173
Mahmeleh RD	3,925	5,041	5,452
Mahmeleh (city) (Note: Became a city after the 2016 census)			
Total	7,199	8,998	9,625
RD = Rural District
