= Seyfabad Rural District =

Rural district in Fars province, Iran

Seyfabad Rural District Persian: دهستان سيف آباد
- Rural District
- Location within Iran
- Coordinates: 28°02′23″N 53°16′35″E
- Country: Iran
- Province: Fars
- County: Khonj
- District: Central
- Capital: Seyfabad

Population (2016)
  - Total: 8,992
- Time zone: UTC+3:30 (IRST)

Seyfabad Rural District (Persian: دهستان سيف آباد) is in the Central District of Khonj County, Fars province, Iran. Its capital is the village of Seyfabad.

== Demographics ==
=== Population ===
At the time of the 2006 National Census, the rural district's population was 8,091 in 1,623 households. There were 9,159 inhabitants in 2,160 households at the following census of 2011. The 2016 census measured the population of the rural district as 8,992 in 2,503 households. The most populous of its 54 villages was Sedeh, with 2,137 people.
