= Central District (Khonj County) =

District in Fars province, Iran

Central District (Khonj County) Persian: بخش مرکزی شهرستان خنج
- District
- Location within Iran
- Coordinates: 28°01′51″N 53°22′30″E
- Country: Iran
- Province: Fars
- County: Khonj
- Capital: Khonj

Population (2016)
  - Total: 31,732
- Time zone: UTC+3:30 (IRST)

The Central District of Khonj County (Persian: بخش مرکزی شهرستان خنج) is in Fars province, Iran. Its capital is the city of Khonj.

== Demographics ==
=== Population ===
At the time of the 2006 National Census, the district's population was 30,779 in 5,544 households. The following census in 2011 counted 31,644 people in 6,892 households. The 2016 census measured the population of the district as 31,732 inhabitants in 8,077 households.

=== Administrative divisions ===
Central District (Khonj County) Population
Administrative Divisions	2006	2011	2016
Seyfabad RD	8,091	9,159	8,992
Tang-e Narak RD	3,341	3,693	3,523
Khonj (city)	19,347	18,792	19,217
Total	30,779	31,644	31,732
RD = Rural District
