= Khonj County =

County in Fars province, Iran

Khonj County Persian: شهرستان خنج
- County
- Location of Khonj County in Fars province (bottom, pink)

- Location of Fars province in Iran
- Coordinates: 28°01′N 53°02′E
- Country: Iran
- Province: Fars
- Capital: Khonj
- Districts: Central, Mahmeleh

Population (2016)
  - Total: 41,359
- Time zone: UTC+3:30 (IRST)

Khonj County (Persian: شهرستان خنج) is in Fars province, Iran. Its capital is the city of Khonj.

== Demographics ==
=== Language and ethnicity ===
Khonj was traditionally part of the region of Irahistan. Khonj's inhabitants are Achomi people.

== History ==
After the 2016 National Census, the village of Mahmeleh was elevated to the status of a city.

=== Population ===
At the time of the 2006 census, the county's population was 37,978 in 7,025 households. The following census in 2011 counted 41,133 people in 9,121 households. The 2016 census measured the population of the county as 41,359 in 10,708 households.

=== Administrative divisions ===
Khonj County's population history and administrative structure over three consecutive censuses are shown in the following table.

Khonj County Population
Administrative Divisions	2006	2011	2016
Central District	30,779	31,644	31,732
Seyfabad RD	8,091	9,159	8,992
Tang-e Narak RD	3,341	3,693	3,523
Khonj (city)	19,347	18,792	19,217
Mahmeleh District	7,199	8,998	9,625
Baghan RD	3,274	3,957	4,173
Mahmeleh RD	3,925	5,041	5,452
Mahmeleh (city) (Note: Became a city after the 2016 census)			
Total	37,978	41,133	41,359
RD = Rural District

== See also ==
Media related to Khonj County at Wikimedia Commons
