= Logistics (Finnish Defence Forces) =

Branch of the Finnish Army

- Huolto
- Insignia of the Finnish Defence Forces Logistics Command
- Country: Finland
- Role: Matériel
- March: Vapaa kansa
- Website: https://logistiikkalaitos.fi/en/

Commanders
- Deputy Chief of Staff, Armaments and Logistics: Lieutenant General Jari Mikkonen
- Chief of Logistics: Brigadier General Jyri Raitasalo
- Chief Surgeon: Brigadier General (Med.) Tuomo Leino
- Chief of Finnish Defence Forces Logistics Command: Major General Tero Ylitalo
- Deputy Manager of Finnish Defence Forces Logistics Command: Brigadier General (Eng.) Juha-Matti Ylitalo
- Inspector of Logistics: Colonel Mikael Laine
- Navy Chief of Logistics: Captain Juha Torkkeli
- Air Force Chief of Logistics: Lieutenant colonel Timo Antikainen

Logistics (Finnish: Huolto, Swedish: Underhållet) is a service branch of the Finnish Army. The branch is responsible for supporting other troops with materiel transports and medical care, including the evacuation and treatment of the sick and wounded. Logistics troops make up around one third of the wartime strength of the Finnish Defence Forces.

== Training branch insignia ==
Training branch insignia of training branches belonging to logistics
Logistics (Huolto)

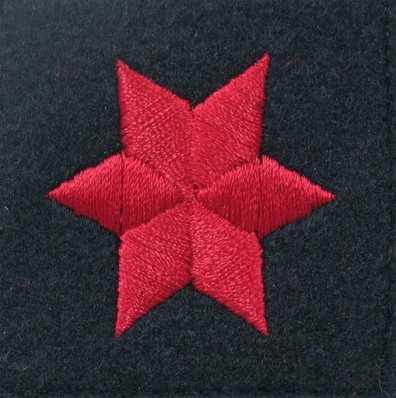
Navy logistics (Merivoimien Huolto)

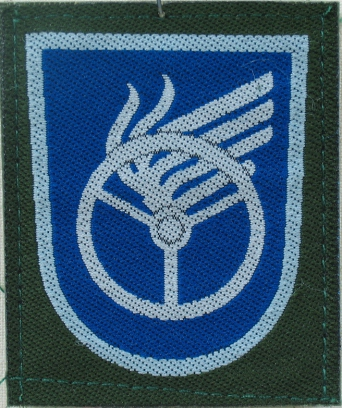
Driver (Kuljettaja)

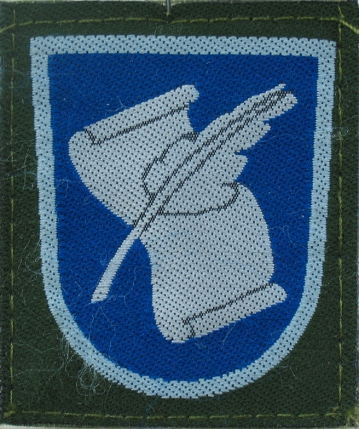
Scribe (Kirjuri)

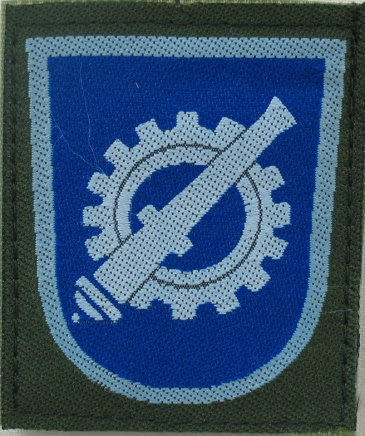
Gunsmith (Aseseppä)

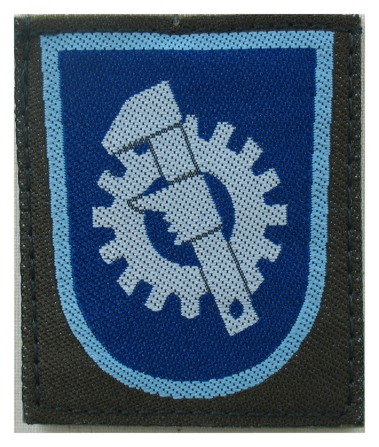
Mechanic (Asentaja)

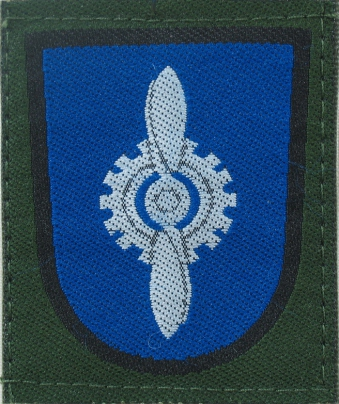
Assistant mechanic (Apumekanikko)

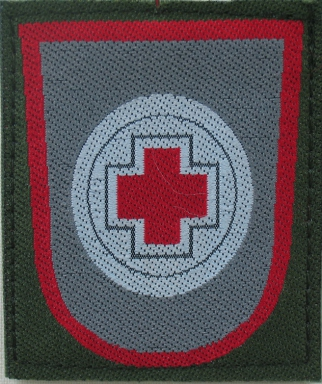
Medic (Lääkäri)

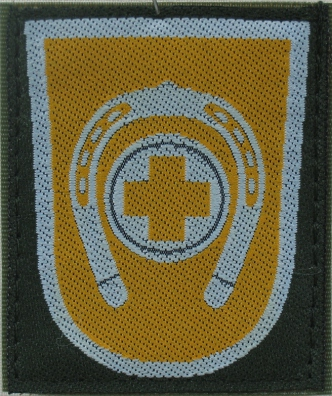
Veterinarian (Eläinlääkäri)

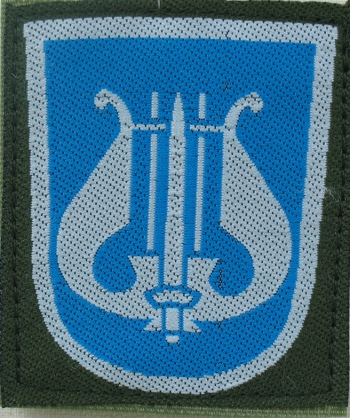
Musician (Soittaja)

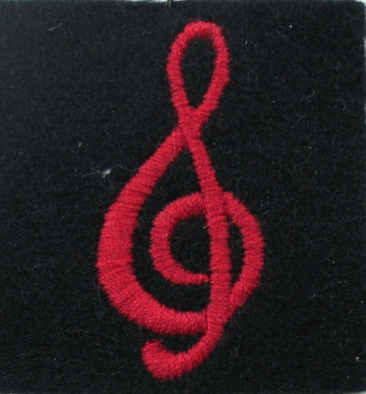
Navy musician (Merivoimien Soittaja)

== History ==
Medical troops and car drivers were founded in 1918, the Gunsmith School in 1919, and logistics officers began training in 1926

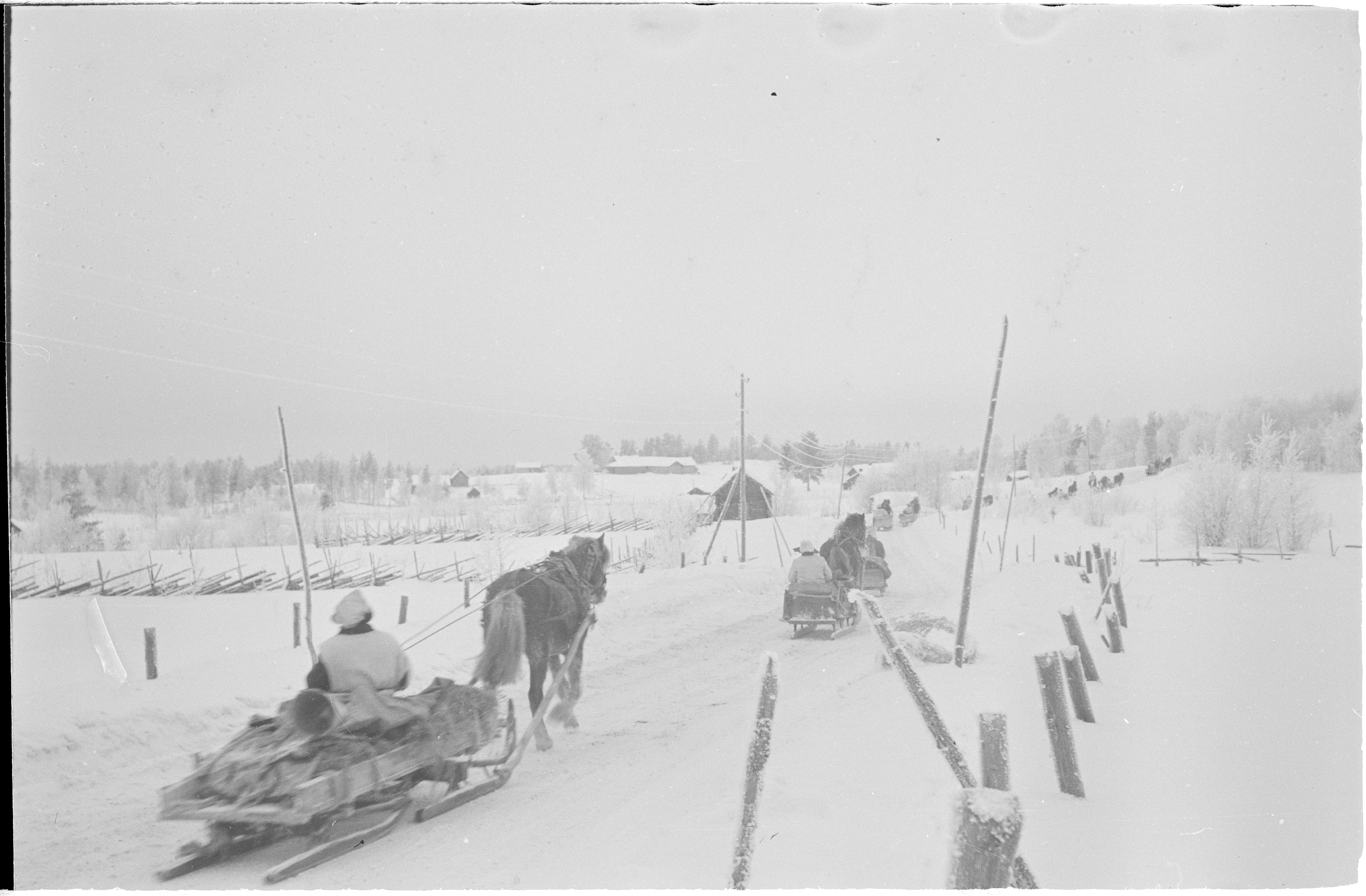
Finnish horse drawn supply column, Pyörittäjänkylä 30 January 1940

For the early independence trough the Second World War, Finnish logistics relied heavily on horses. Work horses were retired in the late 1960s, as the Brigade 70 (Prikaati 70) organisation relied on tractors, and the last riding horses were sold in 1993.

The first animal medical institution, Oppipaja was founded in 1918. After many re-organizations the then Veterinary School was disbanded in 1994, although veterinarians still belong to hired staff, in order to take care of military dogs.

During the cold war equipment acquisitions followed the "1/3 rule" where 1/3 was produced in Finland, 1/3 bought from the Soviet Union, and 1/3 from the west.

The Finnish Defence Forces Logistics Command was founded in 2015 as part of wider reforms of the Finnish Defence Forces.

== Training and units ==
As of 2026, logistics troops are trained at the following peace time units:

Karelia Brigade:

- Karelia Logistics Battalion: Trained specializations include Leopard 1A2 ARV crews, XA-185AS Armoured ambulance crews, medic, armour mechanic (Leopard and CV9030), vehicle technician, gunsmith, electronics technician, military cook, tractor driver, and military drivers (trucks and busses)
  - 1st Logistics Company: Materiel and logistics troops for Army independent Forces' (operatiivinenyhtymä) mechanized jaeger battalions, logistics battalions, regional battle groups, and Logistics Command logistics battalions
  - 2nd Logistics Company: Non-commissioned officer (NCO) training, Karelia Logistics Battalion's driver training

Kainuu Brigade:

- Kuopio Logistics battalion: Trained specializations include medic, fighting vehicle technician (tracked vehicle driver), gunsmith, electronics technician, military cook, tractor driver, military drivers (trucks and busses), and depot men
  - Logistics Company: materiel and logistics companies of Army battle groups, logistics battalions, and Logistics Command logistics battalions
  - 1st Separate Truck Company: NCO training, Kuopio Logistics Battalion's driver training

Pori Brigade:

- Finland Proper Logistics Battalion
  - 1st Logistics Company (Säkylä): NCO training, medical training, and logistics services
  - 2st Logistics Company (Niinisalo): Focus on replenishment, maintenance, and drivers

Armoured Brigade:

- Parola Logistics Battalion: Trained specializations include Leopard 1A2 ARV crews, evacuation MT-LB crews, MT-LBv crews, MT-LBu AS ambulance, medic, armour mechanic, vehicle technician, military cook, military drivers (trucks and busses), and conscript musicians
  - 1st Armour Maintenance Company
  - 2st Armour Maintenance Company
  - Truck Company
  - Conscript Band of the Finnish Defence Forces
- Häme Armoured Battalion:
  - Armoured Engineer Company: Trains troops for command and support tasks

Jaeger Brigade:

- Lapland Jaeger Battalion:
  - Logistics Company: Military drivers (trucks and combination busses), and medics
  - 1st Jaeger Company: NCO training, high-level readiness unit logistics platoon
- Rovaniemi Air Defence Battalion
  - Airbase Support Company: Cook, clerk, logistician, fuel specialist, medic, mechanic, military driver, and UAV operator
  - 2nd Air Defence Battery: NCO training

Guard Jaeger Regiment:

- Uusimaa Jaeger Battalion:
  - The Headquarters and Signal Company: logistics
  - Non-Commissioned Officer School: NCO training
- Guard Battalion:
  - The Transportation Company: heavy vehicle drivers and commanders

Utti Jaeger Regiment:

- Logistics Company: Trained specializations include medic, logistics NCOs and reserve officer, cook, vehicle technician, electronics technician, military driver, scribe, and depot men

Army Academy:

- Reserve Officer School: Logistics reserve officers
- Army Research Centre: Research and development

Logistics School: Field medicine reserve officer training, branch specific training of logistics Cadet and Master of military science students. It also performs research and development of doctrine

Nyland Brigade (Navy):

- Ekenäs Coastal Battalion: Military drivers
  - Headquarters and Signal Company: Trained areas include resupply, maintenance, medics, and military cooks

Coastal Brigade (Navy):

- Porkkala Coastal Battalion
  - Support Company
  - Transport Company
  - Materiel Centre

Coastal Fleet (Navy):

- Headquarters: Logistics section
- 8th Service Support Squadron: Oil spill response, maritime logistics, military drivers

Air Force Academy (Air Force): Training of all military drivers and fighter and helicopter assistant mechanics for the Air Force

- Logistics Centre
- Teaching battalion: Logistics NCOs

Karelia Air Wing (Air Force): Military drivers, military cooks, medics, and assistant mechanics

- Aircraft Maintenance Squadron: Maintenance and repair of aircraft and equipment
- Logistics Centre

Lapland Air Wing (Air Force): Military drivers and assistant mechanics

- Aircraft Maintenance Squadron
- Logistics Centre

Satakunta Air Wing (Air Force): Military drivers, military cooks, medics

- Supporting Air Operations Squadron: Transport flights
- Aircraft Maintenance Squadron: Maintenance
- Logistics Centre: Storage and land transport for the Satakunta Air Wing

In addition to the Logistics School, the Finnish Defence Forces Logistics Command operates the following brigade-level units that primarily do not train conscripts:

- Logistics Command Headquarters
- Joint Systems Centre
  - National Codification Bureau Finland
- Centre for Military Medicine
- Explosives Centre
- 1st Logistics Regiment
- 2nd Logistics Regiment
- 3rd Logistics Regiment

Colours of logistics units
Karelia Logistics Battalion

Kuopio Logistics battalion

Finland Proper Logistics Battalion

== See also ==
- Engineers (Finnish Defence Forces)
- Field artillery (Finnish Defence Forces)
- Signals (Finnish Defence Forces)
- Ground-based air defence (Finnish Defence Forces)
