= Ground-based air defence (Finnish Defence Forces) =

Branch of the Finnish Army

- Ilmatorjunta
- Country: Finland
- Role: Air defence
- March: Nuijamiesten marssi
- Anniversaries: 30 November (Viborg Bang and baptism by fire in the Winter War)

Commanders
- Inspector of Air Defence: Colonel Mano-Mikael Nokelainen

Insignia
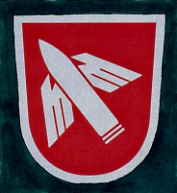
- Gunner training branch insignia (Ilmatorjunta)

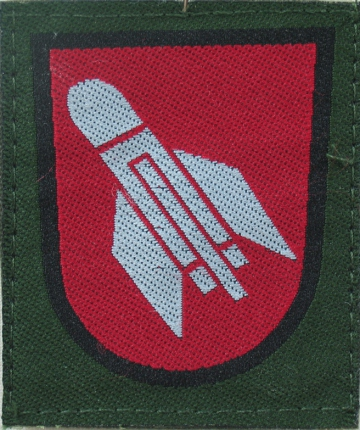
- Missile branch insignia (Ilmatorjuntaohjus)

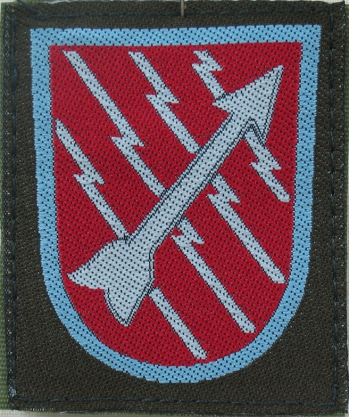
- Radar operator branch insignia (Tutka)

Ground-based air defence (Finnish: Ilmatorjunta, Swedish: Fältartilleriet) is a service branch of the Finnish Army. The branch is responsible for the destruction and denial of enemy air assets and the protection of both military and civilian targets from air attacks.

== History ==
=== Early history ===
During the First World War, almost 1,900 Finnish men travelled to Germany to receive military training as part of the Jäger Movement. Out of the volunteers was formed the 27th Jäger Battalion. Some Jägers received anti-aircraft training using field guns.

Inspector of Artillery, then colonel, Vilho Nenonen suggested the formation of anti-air artillery units in 1921. The acquisition of guns started in 1924 and the Air Defence Contingent was founded in Suomenlinna on 1 July 1925 on the orders of lieutenant colonel Väinö Valve. The first battery was founded on 18 June 1926.

In 1937 ground-based air defence was moved from artillery to the air force, and in 1939 it became an independent service branch.

=== The Winter War ===
Air defence during the Winter War was successful, with relatively low civilian casualties and a high shooting accuracy by air defence units.

During the Interim Peace the amount of anti-air weapons grew by sevenfold. Acoustic location, searchlights, and the development of barrage techniques (sulkuammunta) were a response to the nighttime bombing by Soviet aviation.

=== The Continuation War ===
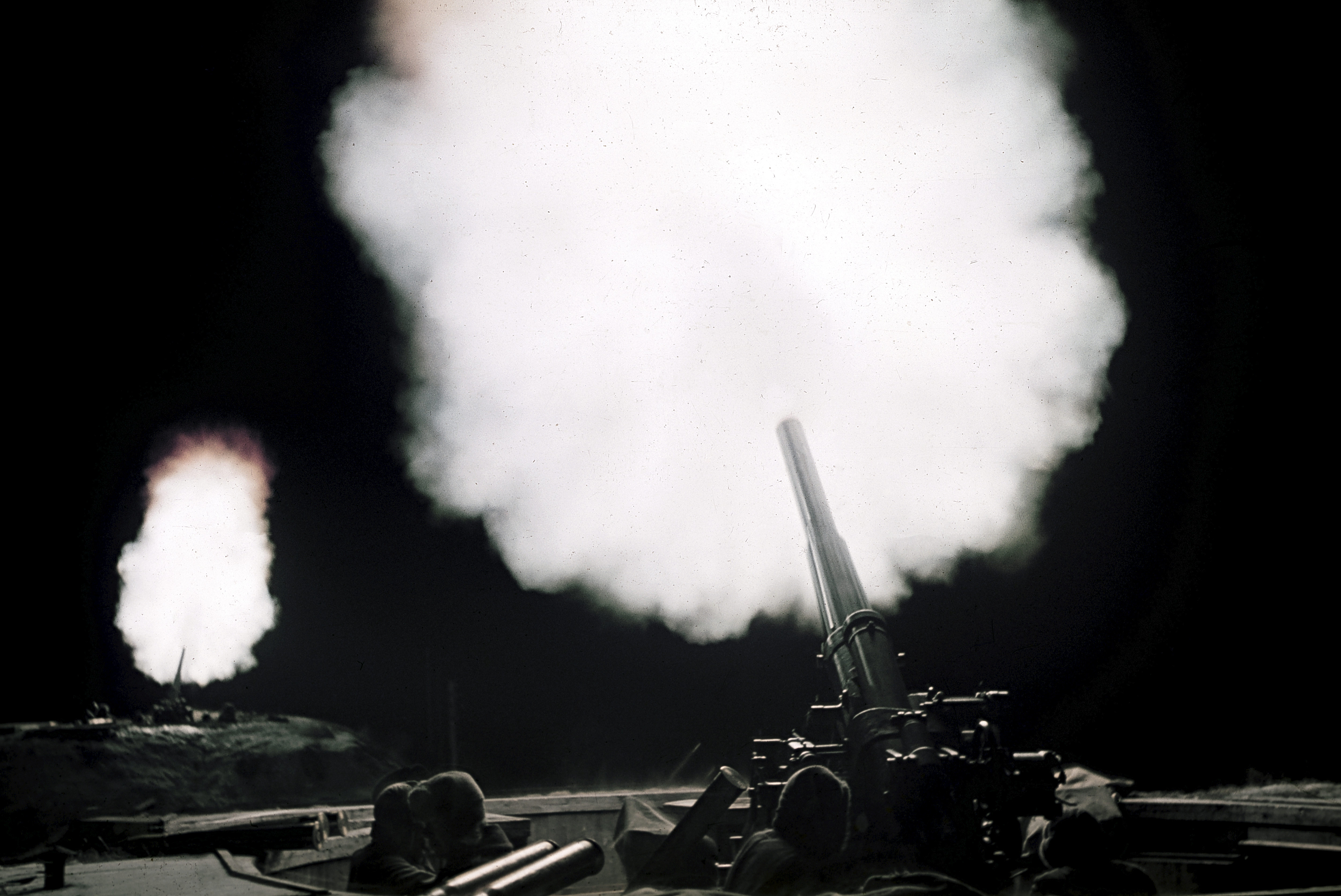
Anti-air artillery firing in Taivaskallio, Helsinki, 23 November 1942

Radars were acquired from Germany in 1943. A significant amount of new anti-air guns bought were only delivered in 1944 or not at all.

Improvements in technology and technique helped to protect Helsinki and Kotka from the effects massive Soviet air raids in February 1944.

=== Post war ===
Soviet 23 ITK 61 anti-air autocannons and SU-57-2s were acquired in the 1960s. Additionally SAM-75M missiles were planned to be bought, but the sale was blocked by the United States under the 1947 Paris Peace Treaty, as they could threaten American nuclear bombers, and thus the nuclear deterrance.

The first anti-air missile, a Strela-2, was fired in Finland on 22 February 1979, and ITO 79 missiles were bought in the beginning of the 1980s. ITO90 missiles were bought in the beginning of the 1990s, and Marksman anti-aircraft systems were installed on T-55 chassis in 1990.

=== Post 2000 ===
The Marksmans were updated by installing them on Leopard 2 chassis, and the updated versions entered service with the Finnish Army in 2016.

== Training and units ==
As of 2026, Finnish air defence troops are trained at the following units:

Jaeger Brigade:

- Rovaniemi Air Defence Battalion:
  - 1st Air Defence Battery: Trained equipment includes Crotale surface-to-air missiles, 23 ITK 61 autocannons, and targeting radars
  - 2st Air Defence Battery: Training of non-commissioned officers (NCOs), (and military police)
  - (Airbase Support Company)

Karelia Brigade:

- Salpausselkä Air Defense Battalion:
  - 1st Air Defence Battery: Command centre units, anti-aircraft artillery using 23 ITK 61 and 23 ITK 61/95 autocannons
  - 2st Air Defence Battery: NCO training
  - 3st Air Defence Battery: Missile units, and AA-artillery units for independent forces (operatiivinenyhtymä), army groups, and other branches of the Finnish Defence Forces. Equipment includes ITO 15, ITO 05M, and ITO 05 missiles and 23 ITK 61 and 23 ITK 61/95 autocannons

Armoured Brigade:

- Helsinki Air Defence Regiment: Focus on ground-based air defence of Helsinki capital region and mechanized battlegroups. Trained equipment includes NASAMS 2 FIN air defense system, MOSTKA 87M and MOSTKA 12 target acquisition radars, 35 ITK 88 and 23 ITK 61/95 autocannons, Leopard 2 Marksman SPAAG
  - Armoured Anti-Aircraft Battery
  - Command Post Battery
  - 1st Anti-Aircraft Missile Battery
  - 2st Anti-Aircraft Missile Battery

Army Academy:

- Reserve Officer School: All reserve officers of the service branch are trained in the Firing Battery.
- Army Research Centre: Research and development

Air Force Academy:

- The Education and Training Centre:
  - Ground-based air defence sector: Further training of professional soldiers, and personnel of partners such as Millog. Branch specific training of ground-based air defence Cadet and Master of military science students

All of three brigade-level units also train supporting personnel.

Colours of ground-based air defence units
Rovaniemi Air Defence Battalion

Salpausselkä Air Defense Battalion

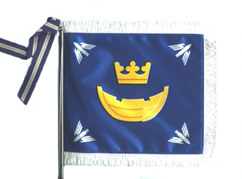
Helsinki Air Defence Regiment

== See also ==
- List of equipment of the Finnish Army#Anti-aircraft systems
- Engineers (Finnish Defence Forces)
- Field artillery (Finnish Defence Forces)
- Signals (Finnish Defence Forces)
