= Field artillery (Finnish Defence Forces) =

Branch of the Finnish Army

- Kenttätykistö
- Country: Finland
- Role: Field artillery
- Anniversaries: 6 March (Birthday of General Vilho Nenonen)

Commanders
- Inspector of Artillery: Colonel Petri Majuri
- Notable commanders: General Vilho Nenonen

Insignia
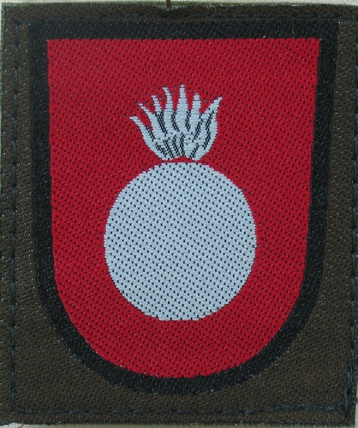
- Artillery training branch insignia (Tykki)

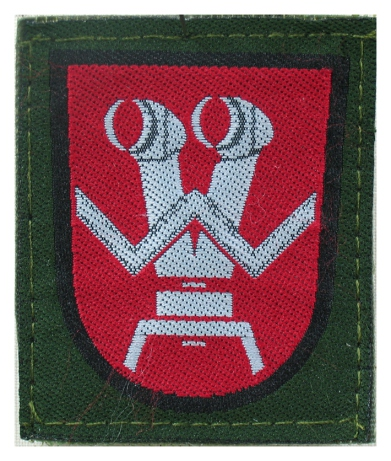
- Forward observer training branch insignia (Tulenjohtaja)

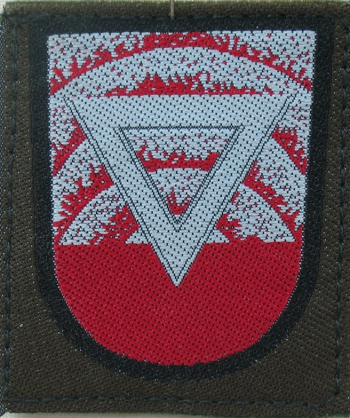
- Counter battery radar training branch insignia (Paikantamistutki)

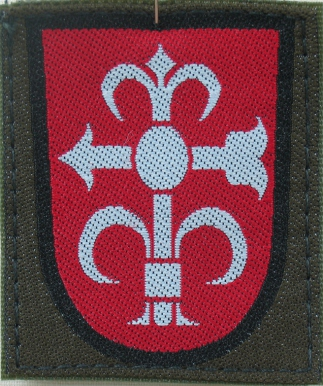
- Meteorologist training branch insignia (Sää)

Field artillery (Finnish: Kenttätykistö, Swedish: Fältartilleriet) is a service branch of the Finnish Army. The branch has troops fielding field guns, rocket launchers, self-propelled guns, and contains roles supporting their use, such as forward observers and counter battery radar.

== History ==
=== Before independence ===
The first confirmed piece of artillery came to Finland in 1434 and was placed in Raasepori castle. Häme Castle had close to 100 artillery pieces in the 1500s. 1643 is held as the birth year of Finnish artillery, as it is when an artillery master was appointed at the War Collage of Sweden. The Finnish Artillery Regiment was founded in 1794. Finland's Artillery Cadet School (Suomen Tykistökadettikoulu) was founded in 1747.

Both the Finnish Artillery Regiment and the Artillery Cadet School were disbanded in 1810, after Russia gained control of Finland. Artillery education continued at the Haapaniemi Cadet School, and later at the Hamina Cadet School.

=== Jäger movement ===
During the First World War, almost 1,900 Finnish men went to Germany to receive military training as part of the Jäger Movement. Out of the volunteers was formed the 27th Jäger Battalion.

The Jäger artillery had their platoon officially formed on 17 March 1916.

=== Early independence ===
Both sides of the Finnish Civil War had artillery units. The Pietarsaari Artillery School was founded in February 1918, and all those who had technical training and a completed matriculation examination were asked to sign up by the General Headquarters. The artillery used was either captured from the Russians or bought from the Germans.

Early on, artillery doctrine would be learned from the French.

Vilho Nenonen was the Inspector of Artillery from 25 May 1920 to 1937. He was the developer of Finnish artillery. He set the basic artillery unit as a battery, and made artillery fire indirect fire with barrages of one minute. He had forward observers move with infantry and was also influence in the development of surveying, meteorology, and topography. He also developed the fire control card (tulenjohtokortti), used from 1920 to 1943, enabling the direction of fire by forward observers without them knowing the location of the artillery pieces.

Artillery camps at Perkjärvi were started in 1923.

=== The Winter War ===
During the Winter War there was a great shortage of artillery munitions. Nenonen was in the USA buying artillery pieces, although they arrived after the war had ended.

=== The Continuation War ===
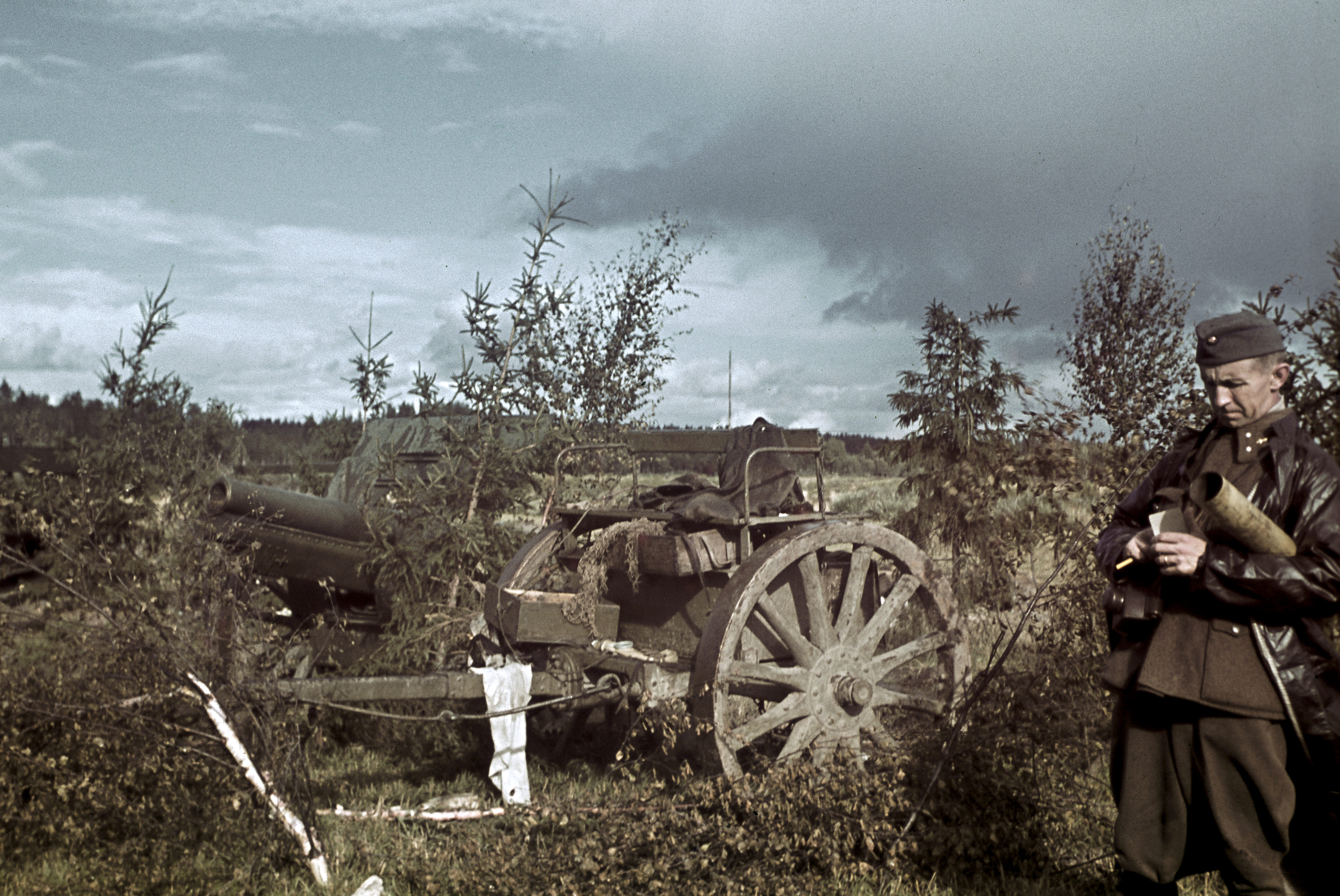
Finnish artillery during the Continuation War

Using captured and bought equipment, 77 field artillery batteries were formed, and at the end of the war there were 86 batteries.

The invention of the weather radiosonde in 1942 and the Fire Correction Circle by Major Unto Petäjä in 1943 improved artillery accuracy.

During the Battle of Tali-Ihantala up to 20 batteries were able to concentrate on the same target using the Fire Correction Circle, and destroy the Soviet attack build up.

=== Post-war ===
The Rovajärvi training area founded in 1949.

The Artillery School was moved from Tuusula to Niinisalo in 1969.

Parts of the field artillery were horse pulled up to the end of the 1960s. Finnish made artillery pieces began manufacture, and Soviet pieces were also bought during the decade. The largest amount of artillery men were trained in 1969, amounting to 5,300 men, and the mobilization strength then was 108 batteries.

In 1992-1993 artillery was bought from Germany, increasing the amount of self-propelled guns and rocket launchers.

=== Post 2000 ===
MLRS M270 pieces were bought from the Netherlands in 2006.

The Finnish Defence Forces received the first K9 Thunder, which would be used for designing the final order configuaration, on 17 January 2019. K9 training began with the 2/2019 class.

Finland has the second largest amount of artillery pieces in Europe as of 2016.

== Training and units ==
As of 2026, field artillery is trained at the following units:

Pori Brigade:

- Satakunta Artillery Regiment: Crews for Heavy rocket launcher, AMOS, 155 K 98, and meteorologist
  - 1st Artillery Battery
  - 2nd Artillery Battery
  - Mortar Company
  - Multiple Rocket Launcher System Battery

Armoured Brigade:

- Jaeger Artillery Regiment:
  - Self-Propelled Howitzer Battery: Crews for 155 PSH K9
  - Armoured Mortar Company: Mortar companies, fire support, drone, and armoured forward observer squads. Main equipment is heavy mortar 120 KRH, MT-LBv, and BPM-1TJ forward observer vehicle, with some squads trained for light mortar 81 KRH. Orbiter 2 drones are in use
  - (Armoured Signals Company: Headquarter and signals companies for battlegroups and the Finnish Defence Forces C5 Agency)

Kainuu Brigade:

- Kainuu Artillery Regiment: Forward observer squads, artillery and mortar squads, command point intelligence and indirect fire leaders, supporting roles, joint terminal attack controllers. 81 mm and 120 mm light mortars, 122 H 63 howitzer, 155 K 83-97 gun-howitzer, 122 RAKH 89 M1 rocket launcher.
  - 1st Field Artillery Battery
  - 2st Field Artillery Battery
  - Mortar Company

Karelia Brigade:

- Karelia Artillery Regiment: Crews for AMOS, and counter-battery radars. Various support roles.
  - 1st Field Artillery Battery: Forward observer squads
  - 2nd Field Artillery Battery: 155 PSH K9 crews
  - Mortar Company: light 81 mm and heavy 120 mm mortar squads

Army Academy:

- Reserve Officer School: All reserve officers
- The Education and Training Centre: Planning, preparing, and implementing training for professional soldiers
  - Artillery School: Branch specific training of field artillery Cadet and Master of military science students
- Army Research Centre: Research and development
Colours of artillery units
Kainuu Artillery Regiment

Karelia Artillery Regiment

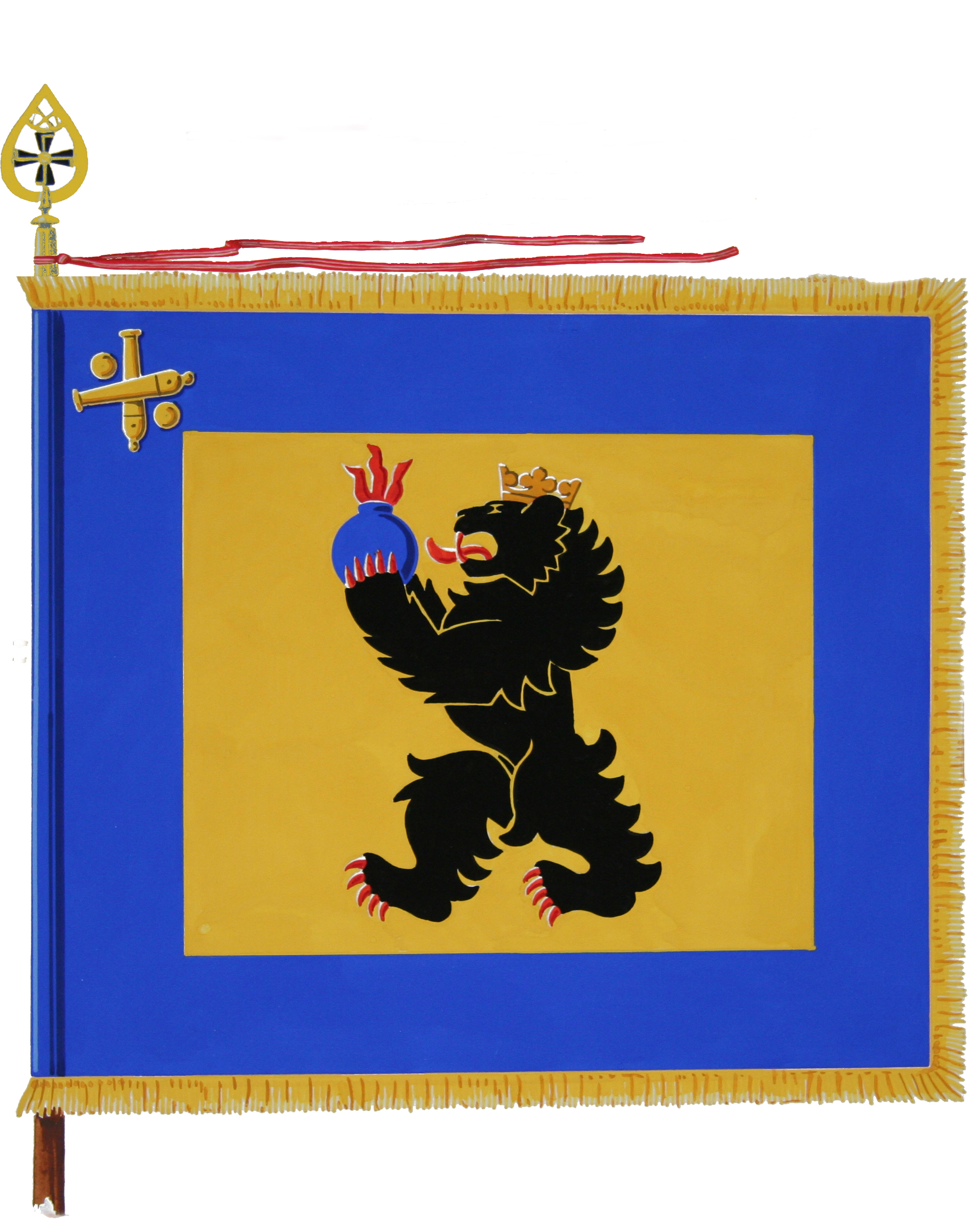
Satakunta Artillery Regiment

== See also ==
- The Artillery Museum of Finland, former museum of Finnish field artillery. Merged to form Museo Militaria.
- List of equipment of the Finnish Army#Field artillery
- Engineers (Finnish Defence Forces)
- Signals (Finnish Defence Forces)
- Ground-based air defence (Finnish Defence Forces)
- Logistics (Finnish Defence Forces)
