= Field artillery (disambiguation) =

Field artillery may refer to:

- Field artillery, a category of mobile weapons supporting armies in the field
- Field Artillery (magazine), a discontinued bimonthly magazine published from 1911 to 2007 by the U.S. Field Artillery Association
- Field artillery (United States), the usage and organization of land-based field artillery in the U.S. Army and U.S. Marine Corps
- Field artillery (Finnish Defence Forces)
- Field Artillery Brigade, a brigade of the U.S. Army
- Field Artillery Branch (United States), a branch of the U.S. Army
- Royal Field Artillery, a branch of British Army artillery, from 1899 to 1924
- United States Army Field Artillery Corps, a corps of the U.S. Army
- U.S. Field Artillery March, song by John Philip Sousa
