= Signals (Finnish Defence Forces) =

Branch of the Finnish Army

- Viesti
- Country: Finland
- Role: Military signals
- March: Suomalainen sotilaslaulu
- Anniversaries: 5 March (The founding of the Field Telegraph Battalion)

Commanders
- Defence Command Chief of C5: Major General Jarmo Vähätiitto
- Inspector of Signals: Colonel Antti Tunkkari
- Navy Chief of C5: Captain Petteri Kuosmanen

Insignia
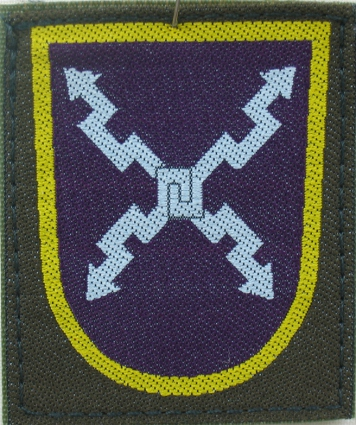
- Signals training branch insignia (Viesti)

- Electronic warfare training branch insignia (ELSO)

Signals (Finnish: Viesti, Swedish: Signalvapenslaget) is a service branch of the Finnish Army. Units in the branch are responsible for the establishment and upkeep of command posts and communication systems in support of artillery fire control and the command of units of other branches.

== History ==
=== Jäger movement ===
During the First World War, almost 1,900 Finnish men went to Germany to receive military training as part of the Jäger Movement. Out of the volunteers was formed the 27th Jäger Battalion.

Around 80 Jägers received signals training. A message section for the Battalion was founded on 2 October 1917. Two Jägers were sent with two radio receivers to Finland in order to facilitate communication between German high command and the Finnish Military Committee in the Fall of 1917.

=== Early independence ===
The Field Telegraph Battalion was founded on 5 March 1918 in Mikkeli, but it suffered from a lack of equipment and qualified personnel, and it was made an infantry battalion the next month. The Radio School was founded in May, and the Spark-gap transmitter Department in June.

Message units were formed in three divisions and a mountain brigade on 5 August 1918. These would be combined into a Field Telegraph Battalion in late 1920.

The Technical Troops Command was formed in 1921, following the French model, under which Signals was also designated.

The Field Telegraph Battalion's anniversary was first celebrated in 1923.

Radio intelligence was started in 1927.

As the equipment used was lacking and composed of various models, a type task force formed in 1935, although it didn't end up making major improvements in time for the Winter War.

Signals became an independent branch in October 1939.

=== The Winter War ===
The Winter War led to a doubling of the strength of Signals forces, making it around four per cent of the total strength of the Finnish Army.

Messenger pigeon and dogs, along with signal lights and flags were used by Signals through the Second World War.

=== The Continuation War ===
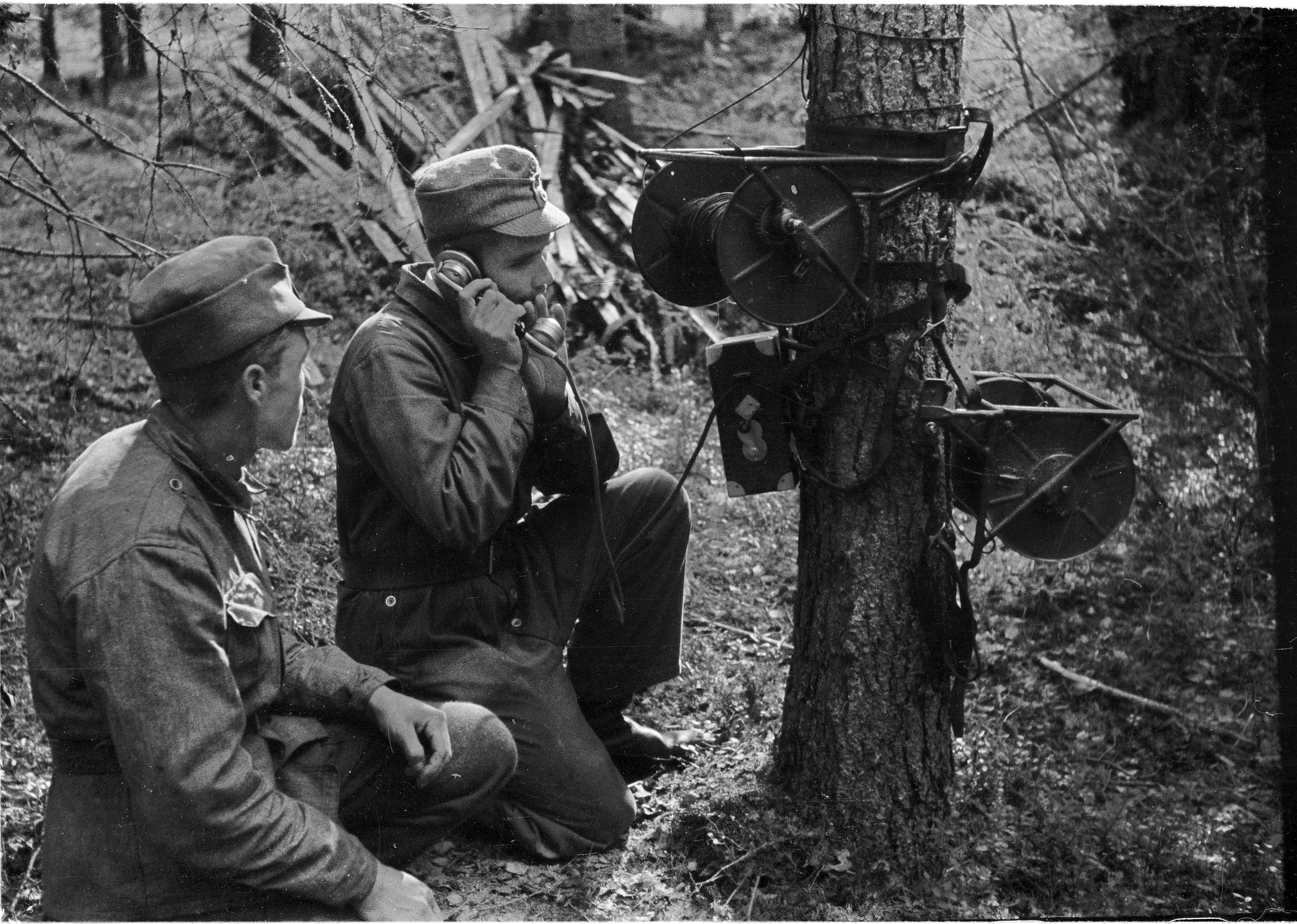
Signal men training 8 August 1941

The lack of equipment improved by the Continuation War, although for example there still were 34 different models of field telephones in use, and wireless communication was mainly radiotelegraphy.

Around 2,300 Lotta female volunteers worked in signals tasks.

=== Post War ===
American walkie-talkie radios were acquired after the war.

A renewal and development program was planned in the 1950s, although the equipment situation would remain bad until the 1970s, when a wide acquisition plan was made. During the 1970s Signals would acquire German DM-data links, and licensed production of American radios would begin. Frequency-hopping radios and the Yhtymän viestijärjestelmä, modernized to the Yhtymän viestijärjestelmä 2 in the 1990s, would enter service in the 1980s, and acquisitions started to focus on systems instead of singular device models.

In 1960 the Viestikeskuskorjaamo, which maintained Signals equipment was founded. It was disbanded, and Millog took over its responsibilities when formed at the start of 2009.

=== Post 2000 ===
The Electronic Warfare Centre was founded in 2007, with an anniversary date of 18 June, as a part of the Signals Regiment.

The Signals Regiment was disbanded in 2014 as part of wider reforms, with the Electronic Warfare Centre becoming a part of the Armoured Brigade, and the Signal School a part of the Army Academy

The development plan of the M18 C5 system was presented by the Army Command Programme Manager in 2012. The main producer is Bittium Corporation. Most units started using it in 2017. It fully replaced the training of the older Yhtymän viestijärjestelmä 2 at the East Finland Signals Battalion in 2021. Existing communication vehicles and command post containers were retrofitted with the system, with field radios remaining in use on lower levels. The system uses IP-communication instead of analog communication, and has a new message transfer system, SVJ2, by Aalto University. It supports the Army Doctrine 2015 by enabling up-to-date transfer of information down to even the squad level.

== Training and units ==
As of 2026, signals is trained at the following units:

Karelia Brigade: Reconnaissance Radio Operator

- East Finland Signals Battalion: M18 C5 system , XA-202 armoured signals vehicle.
  - 1st Signals Company
  - 2nd Signals Company
  - (Headquarters Company)

Kainuu Brigade:

- Northern Finland signal battalion: M18 C5 system
  - 1st Signals company: Signal stations and telecommunication squad personnel, logistics
  - 2nd Signals company: Reconnaissance Radio Operator, non-commissioned officer (NCO) training, command system supervision and control
  - (Headquarters company: HQ personnel, military police)

Pori Brigade:

- Satakunta Engineer and Signals Battalion:
  - Signals Company

Armoured Brigade:

- Jaeger Artillery Regiment:
  - Armoured Signals Company: Headquarter and signals companies for battlegroups and the Finnish Defence Forces C5 Agency

Jaeger Brigade:

- Lapland Jaeger Battalion:
  - 1st Jaeger Company: Signal officer, signal section leader, signal men
  - 3rd Jaeger Company: Ranger signallers, signal officers, signal section leaders, signal man
  - Logistics Company: Signals
  - Heavy Support Arms Company: Signal men
- Rovaniemi Air Defence Battalion
  - 1st Air Defence Battery: Signal officers, signal men
  - 2nd Air Defence Battery: Signals

Guard Jaeger Regiment:

- Uusimaa Jaeger Battalion:
  - The Headquarters and Signal Company
  - Non-Commissioned Officer School: Trains NCOs

Utti Jaeger Regiment: Reconnaissance Radio Operator

- Paratrooper Company: Signals specialists
- Support company: Signal men and NCOs

Army Academy:

- Reserve Officer School: All reserve officers
- The Education and Training Centre: Planning, preparing, and implementing training for professional soldiers
  - Signal School: Branch specific training of engineering Cadet and Master of military science students
- Army Research Centre: Research and development

Additionally signal men and NCOs often belong to units of other branches for their needs.

Colours of signals units
Eastern Finland Signals Battalion

Northern Finland Signals Battalion

Satakunta Engineer and Signals Battalion

== See also ==
- Engineers (Finnish Defence Forces)
- Field artillery (Finnish Defence Forces)
- Ground-based air defence (Finnish Defence Forces)
