= Logistics (disambiguation) =

Logistics is the detailed organization of a complex operation.

Logistics may also refer to:

- Logistics (film), a 2012 Swedish film
- Logistics (musician) (born 1981), stage name of Matt Gresham, British musician
- Logistics (Finnish Defence Forces), a service branch
- Logistic function, a mathematical function
