= Conscript Band of the Finnish Defence Forces =

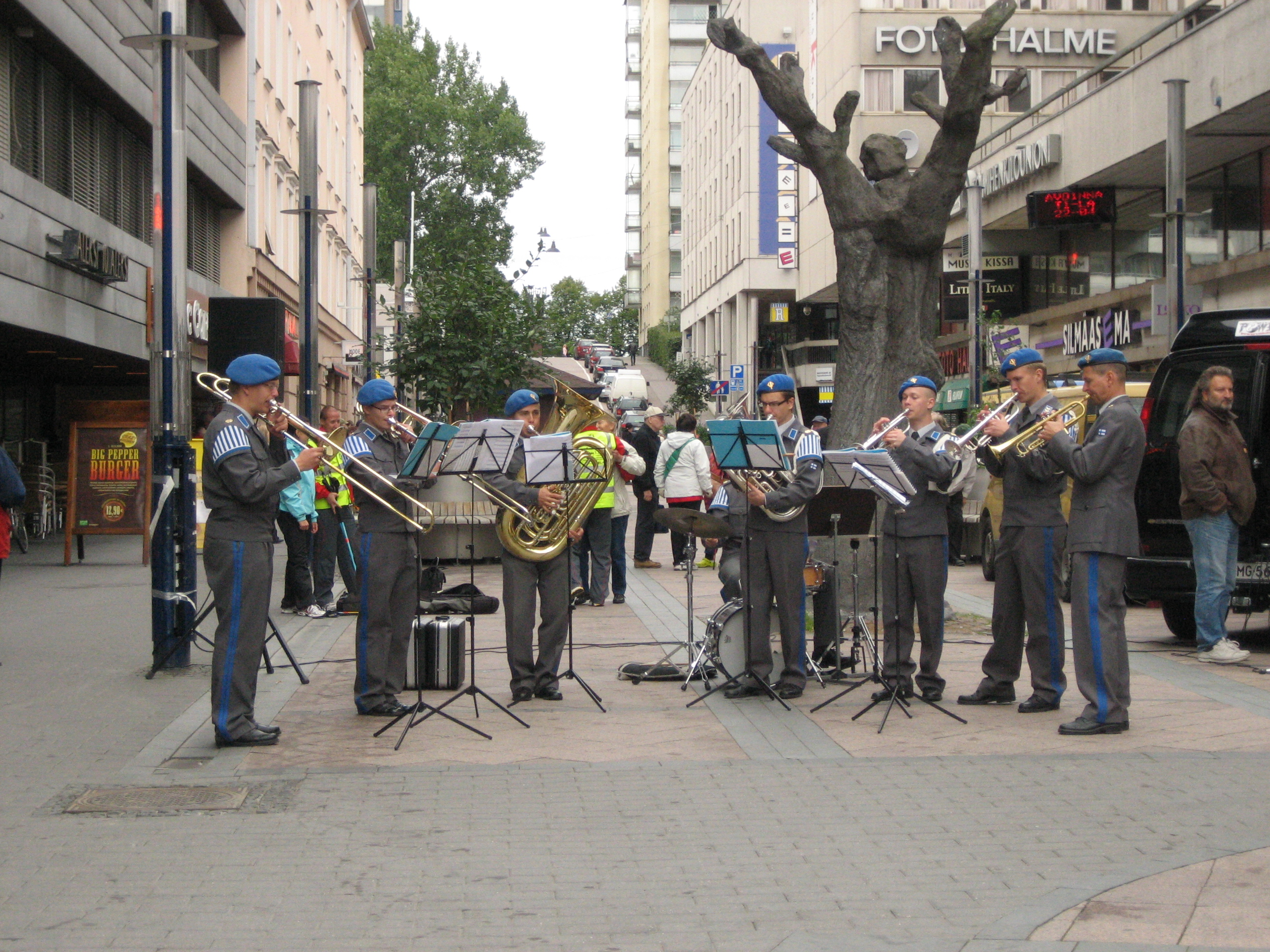
Musicians of the conscript band in Lahti.

The Conscript Band of the Finnish Defence Forces (Finnish: Puolustusvoimien varusmiessoittokunta) is a military band founded in Hamina in 1990 where it was a company-level unit in the Kymi Anti-Aircraft Regiment. In 1996, the Band was transferred to the Häme Regiment in Lahti as a company-level unit in the Military Music School. At the beginning of 2015, the Conscript Band began operations in a new unit at the Hattula Armoured Brigade as the Häme Regiment, was discontinued due to the national defence reform.

Conscript musicians are accepted on the basis of auditions. About 300 men and women apply every year, out of which are chosen roughly a hundred gifted young players of wind, string and percussion as well as band musicians who specialise in popular music. Media and communications experts as well as sound and light technicians also serve in the Conscript Band.

The Conscript Band of the Finnish Defence Forces is a special force intended for music amateurs and professionals. The core of the Conscript Band consists of a symphonic wind orchestra, the main function of which is performing in concerts and figure marching. The Conscript Band can also metamorphose itself into an entertainment band, string orchestra or showband. Showband of the Conscript Band is a regular guest on the Finnish Defence Forces' Summer Tour. Parade Band has previously performed in international Military Tattoo Festivals in Estonia, Sweden, Norway, Denmark, Germany, Russia, France, Belgium, the Netherlands, Latvia, Singapore, Switzerland, Poland and Italy. The Conscript Band and Drill Team performed at The Norwegian Military Tattoo in 1998 and 2008. In 2025, they were a lead performer at the Belfast International Tattoo in Northern Ireland.

== See also ==
- Finnish Air Force Band
- Kaartin Soittokunta
- Hamina Tattoo

== Sources ==
- "Etusivu - Sotilasmusiikki". Varusmiessoittokunta.fi.
- "Puolustusvoimien varusmiessoittokunta". YouTube.
