= Helsinki Air Defence Regiment =

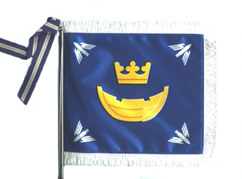
Colours of the Helsinki Air Defence Regiment

The Helsinki Air Defence Regiment (Helsingin Ilmatorjuntarykmentti, HELITR) is a unit of the Armoured Brigade in Parola. The regiment was previously an independent Finnish Army unit located in Hyrylä (in Tuusula municipality, some 30 km north of Helsinki). The regiment trained 800 conscripts per year.

In 2005 the Minister of Defence Seppo Kääriäinen announced that the garrison in Hyrylä would be closed as part of a cost-saving restructuring of the Finnish Defence Forces. On January 1, 2007, the operations of the regiment moved to the Armoured Brigade in Parola. Closing the Hyrylä garrison saves the Defence Forces about 5 million euro per year.

== Organisation ==
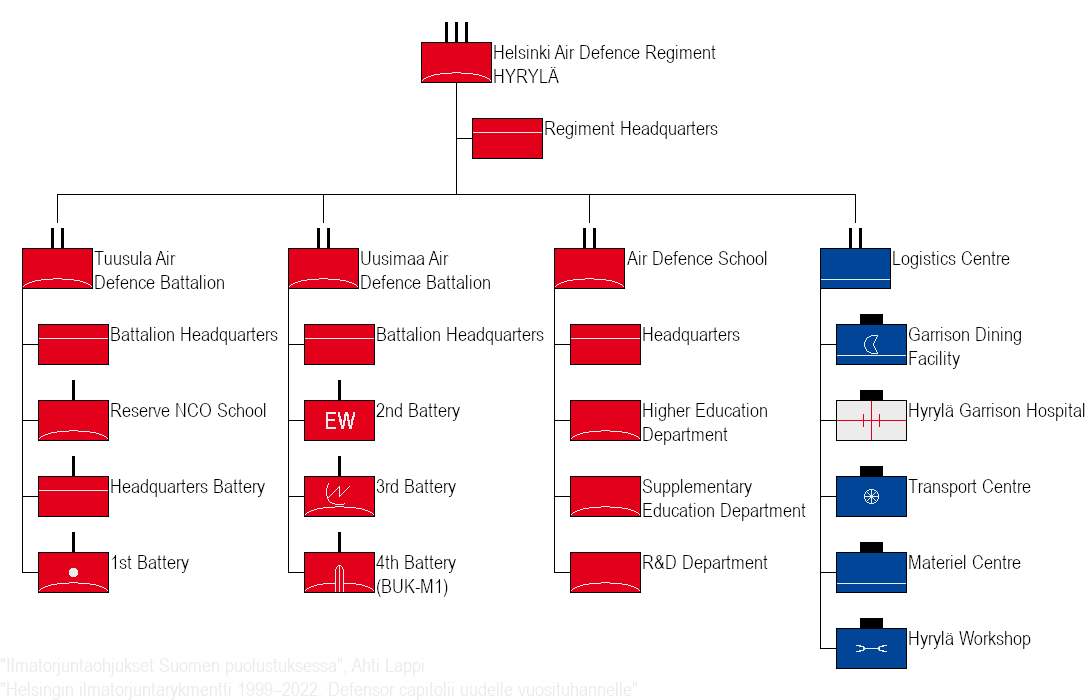
The organisation of the regiment in 2005

The organisation of the independent regiment in 2005:

- Headquarters
- Tuusula Air Defence Battalion
  - NCO School
  - Headquarters Battery
  - 1st Battery
- Uusimaa Air Defence Battalion
  - 2nd Battery
  - 3rd Battery
  - 4th Battery
- Air Defence School
- Logistics Centre

Organisation as part of the Armoured Brigade in 2024:

- Armoured Air Defence Battery
- Command Post Battery
- 1st Missile Air Defence Battery
- 2nd Missile Air Defence Battery

== Equipment ==
- ItO 86 (M Igla)
- ItO 96 (Buk-M1)
- ItO 05 (ASRAD-R on Unimog 5000)
- ItO 90 M (CrotaleNG MOD on Sisu XA-181)
- ItO 12 (NASAMS II FIN, AIM-120 AMRAAM missiles)
- ItO 15 (FIM-92J Stinger RMP Block I)
- 35 ItK 88 (35 mm Oerlikon gun)
- 23 Itk 61 (ZU-23-2)
- 23 Itk 95 (modernised version of ZU-23-2)
- 12.7 Itkk (NSV-12.7)
