= Häme Regiment =

Coordinates: 60°58′03″N 25°37′17″E

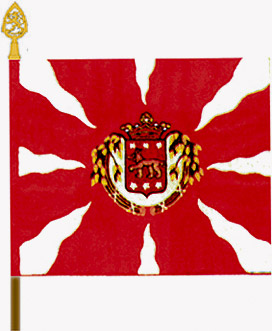
- The Colour of the Regiment
- Active: 1626–1809 Tavastehus regemente (Häme Regiment), Swedish Army; 1919–1939 Tampereen rykmentti (Tampere Regiment); Hämeen rykmentti (Häme Regiment) 1986–2014
- Country: Finland
- Branch: Finnish Army
- Type: Cavalry
- Role: Logistics and reconnaissance training unit
- Size: 340 career personnel, 300–1000 conscripts (varying throughout year)
- Garrison: Hennala, Lahti
- Colors: Yellow
- March: Parolan marssi
- Anniversaries: 3 October: day of founding

Commanders
- Current commander: Colonel Risto Kolstela

Häme Regiment (Finnish: Hämeen rykmentti; Swedish: Tavastlands regemente), was a unit of the Finnish Army located in Lahti. The regiment's main duty was to train conscripts and the personnel of the Finnish Defence Forces and the Finnish Frontier Guard.

== Organisation ==
- Häme Cavalry Battalion (Hämeen ratsujääkäripataljoona)
- Sports School (Urheilukoulu)
- Logistics School (Huoltokoulu)
- Military Music School (Sotilasmusiikkikoulu)
- Logistics Centre

== History ==
The original predecessor of Häme Regiment was founded in 1626 by Gustavus Adolphus of Sweden.

== Mission ==
The Regiment was an administrative unit without significant combat capability. Technically, it was considered to be a cavalry unit, but it did not have light armored unit role of modern-day Western cavalry units. Instead, the regiment was specialized as a logistics training center which trained the bulk of the logistics personnel of Finnish Defence Forces.

The Häme Cavalry Battalion was the only unit of the Regiment accepting usual, non-volunteer conscripts. Twice a year, the Battalion inducted some 260 conscripts, who were subsequently trained as military drivers, logistics technicians, cooks or military policemen.

The Headquarters Troop also trained almost all medics of the Finnish Defence Forces on its three-week combat medic course. The NCO school of the unit, on the other hand, received conscript NCO students from all units of the FDF and the Finnish Border Guard for special training as logistics NCOs. The NCO students were trained to fulfill NCO duties as medic NCOs, motor vehicle NCO, supply NCOs, weapons smith NCOs or hygienics NCOs.

=== Häme Cavalry Battalion ===
The Häme Cavalry Battalion was the main military unit of the Häme Regiment. It provided infantry training for the conscripts. Before the creation of the regiment in 1986, the battalion was its own independent unit. The traditional march of the battalion was the Suomalaisen Ratsuväen marssi 30-vuotisessa sodassa. The battalion was disbanded in 2014.

=== Military Music School ===
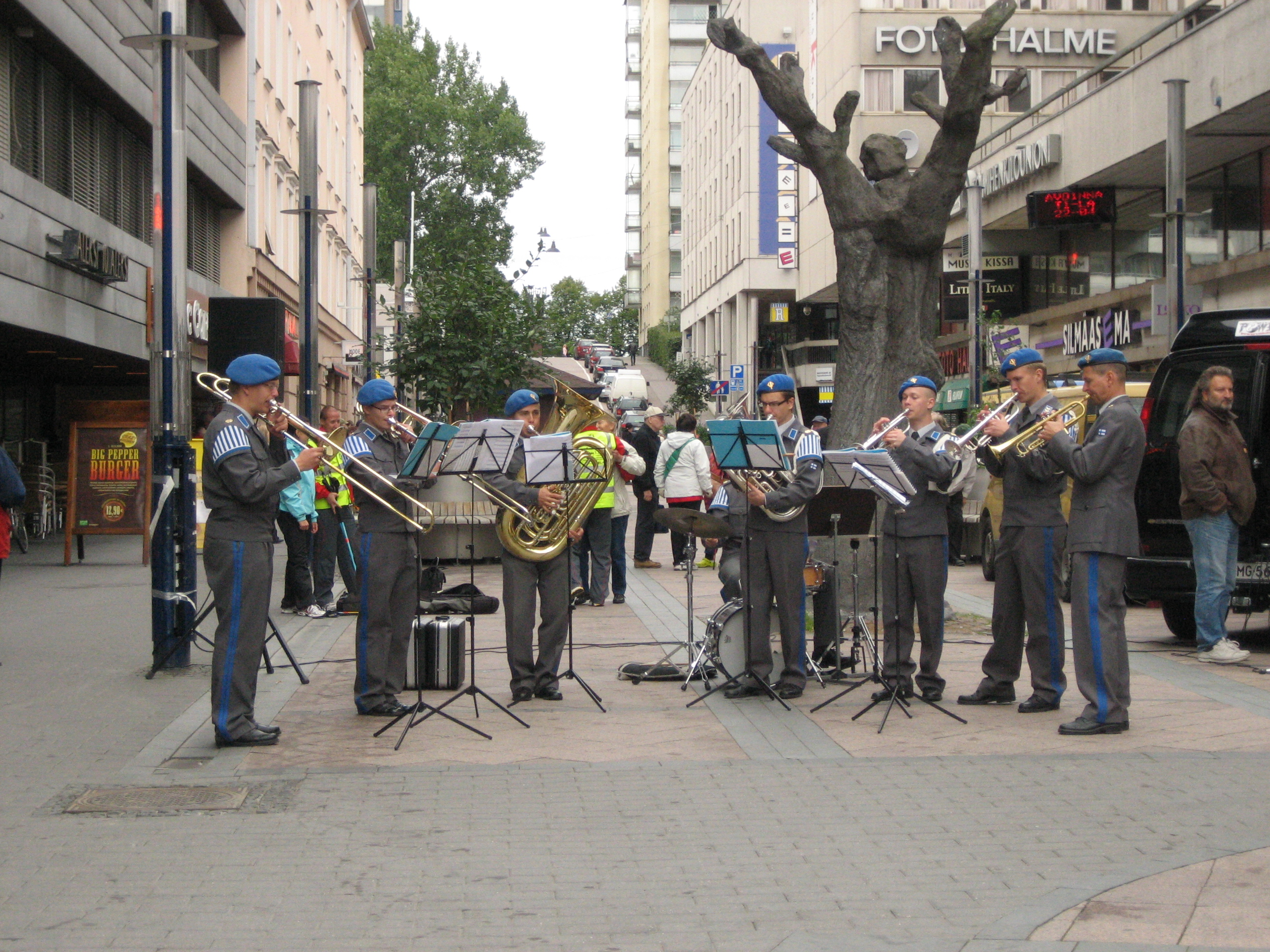
Conscripts of Military Music School playing in downtown Lahti

The Military Music School is open to eligible volunteers. Military Music School accepts yearly some 80 applicants adept at playing a musical instrument, on the basis of national entrance exam. The service term is 9 or 12 months. Most of this time is spent in the Finnish Defence Forces Conscript Band. However, part of the conscripts receive NCO training in addition to their musical duties. In addition to conscript training, the Military Music School trains career musicians of the FDF. In 2015, Conscript Band of the Finnish Defence Forces was moved to Armored Brigade which had its own band (Armored Band) disbanded in 2013. Military Music School as organization was disbanded. The Conscript Band's and Military Music School's traditional march was Marssi nro. 9.

=== Sports School ===
The conscript training in Sports School is open to eligible volunteers. For service in Sports School, the conscript must be at least a semi-professional sportsman of national level. The conscripts of the unit are always trained for reconnaissance duties, interfering as little as possible with the sportsman's career. The typical service term is 12 months, most conscripts receiving at least NCO training. In addition to the conscript training, the Sports School educates the career reconnaissance officers and NCOs and FDF physical education personnel. The Sports School's traditional march is Urheilun Juhlaa. Sports School was moved to Guard Jaeger Regiment in Helsinki. In addition winter sports' professionals are trained in the Kainuu Brigade.

=== Logistics Training Center ===
The Logistics Training Center is a purely professional unit, centering on training FDF and Border Guard logistics personnel. In addition to its training mission, the Center pursues research and development initiatives of the FDF logistics branch. The personnel of the Center participate actively in the specialist conscript training of the Häme Cavalry Battalion. Logistics Training Center's traditional march was Vapaa kansa. Logistics Training Center was attached to newly formed Logistics centre in Riihimäki.
