= Armoured Brigade (Finland) =

Finnish Army training unit

- Panssariprikaati (Finnish); Pansarbrigaden (Swedish)
- Insignia of the Armoured Brigade.
- Active: 1942–1944 Panssaridivisioona (Armoured Division); 1946–1952: Kevyt Prikaati (Light Brigade); 1952–: Panssariprikaati (Armoured Brigade)
- Country: Finland
- Branch: Finnish Army
- Type: Heavy armoured
- Size: 1,700 conscripts, 600 career personnel
- Garrison: Parolannummi, Hattula
- Flag
- March: Parolan marssi
- Anniversaries: 28.6 - Founding of the Finnish Armoured Division
- Equipment: Leopard 2A6; BMP-2
- Engagements: Kuuterselkä; Äyräpää; Tali-Ihantala

Commanders
- Current commander: Colonel Juhana Skyttä
- Notable commanders: Ruben Lagus; Ari Puheloinen; Pekka Toveri

The Armoured Brigade (Note: Finnish: Panssariprikaati, "Armoured Brigade"; Swedish: Pansarbrigaden, "Armoured Brigade") is a Finnish Army training unit located in Parolannummi, Hattula, in southern Finland. The brigade specialises in training armoured and anti-aircraft troops. In case of mobilization, the Finnish Defence Forces would field one armoured brigade. The war-time armoured brigade has a strength of around 5,700 men, and fields 63 main battle tanks, 110 infantry fighting vehicles, circa 100 armoured personnel carriers, mainly of Soviet origin, and roughly 70 other armoured vehicles. However, the remaining war-time armoured brigade is being phased out and replaced by smaller mechanized battle groups. The new mechanized battle groups will field the Leopard 2 MBTs that are not included in the organization of the contemporary war-time armoured brigades.

== Organisation ==
Since Finnish Defence Forces reform in 2015, the structure of the Armoured Brigade is the following:

- Häme Armoured Battalion (HÄMPSP, Hämeen Panssaripataljoona)
  - Military Police Company (SPOLK, Sotilaspoliisikomppania)
  - Tank Company (PSVK, Panssarivaunukomppania)
  - Armoured Jäger Company (PSJK, Panssarijääkärikomppania)
  - Armoured Engineer Company (PSPIONK, Panssaripioneerikomppania)
- Helsinki Anti-Aircraft Regiment (HELITR, Helsingin Ilmatorjuntarykmentti)
  - Command Post Battery (JOKEPTRI, Johtokeskuspatteri)
  - Armoured Anti-Aircraft Battery (PSITPTRI, Panssari-ilmatorjuntapatteri)
  - 1st Anti-Aircraft Missile Battery (1OITPTRI, 1. Ohjusilmatorjuntapatteri)
  - 2nd Anti-Aircraft Missile Battery (2OITPTRI, 2. Ohjusilmatorjuntapatteri)
- Jäger Artillery Regiment (JTR, Jääkäritykistörykmentti)
  - Armoured Signals Company (PSVIESTIK, Panssariviestikomppania)
  - Self-Propelled Howitzer Battery (PSHPTRI, Panssarihaupitsipatteri)
  - Armoured Mortar Company (PSKRHK, Panssarikranaatinheitinkomppania)
- Parola Logistics Battalion (PARHP, Parolan Huoltopataljoona)
  - Truck Company (AUTOK, Autokomppania)
  - 1st Armour Maintenance Company (1PSHK, 1. Panssarihuoltokomppania)
  - 2nd Armour Maintenance Company (2PSHK, 2. Panssarihuoltokomppania)
  - Conscript Band of the Finnish Defence Forces (PVVMSK, Puolustusvoimien Varusmiessoittokunta)
  - Materiel Centre (Materiaalikeskus)
  - Transport Centre (Kuljetuskeskus)
- Centre for Electronic Warfare (ELSOKESK, Elektronisen sodankäynnin keskus)
  - 1st Electronic Warfare Company (1ELSOK, 1. Elektronisen sodankäynnin komppania)
  - 2nd Electronic Warfare Company (2ELSOK, 2. Elektronisen sodankäynnin komppania)

The Armoured Band (Panssarisoittokunta) was disbanded in 2013 as part of FDF reforms. After disbandment of the Military Music School and the Häme Regiment, the Conscript band was attached to the Armoured Brigade. Following the disbandment of the Signals Regiment in 2014, the Centre for Electronic Warfare was attached to the brigade. The Armour School, which trains reserve officers and career personnel, was attached to the Army Academy in 2015. The Command & Control Company (Johtamisjärjestelmäkomppania) was merged with the Armoured Signals Company in December 2021.

== Training equipment ==
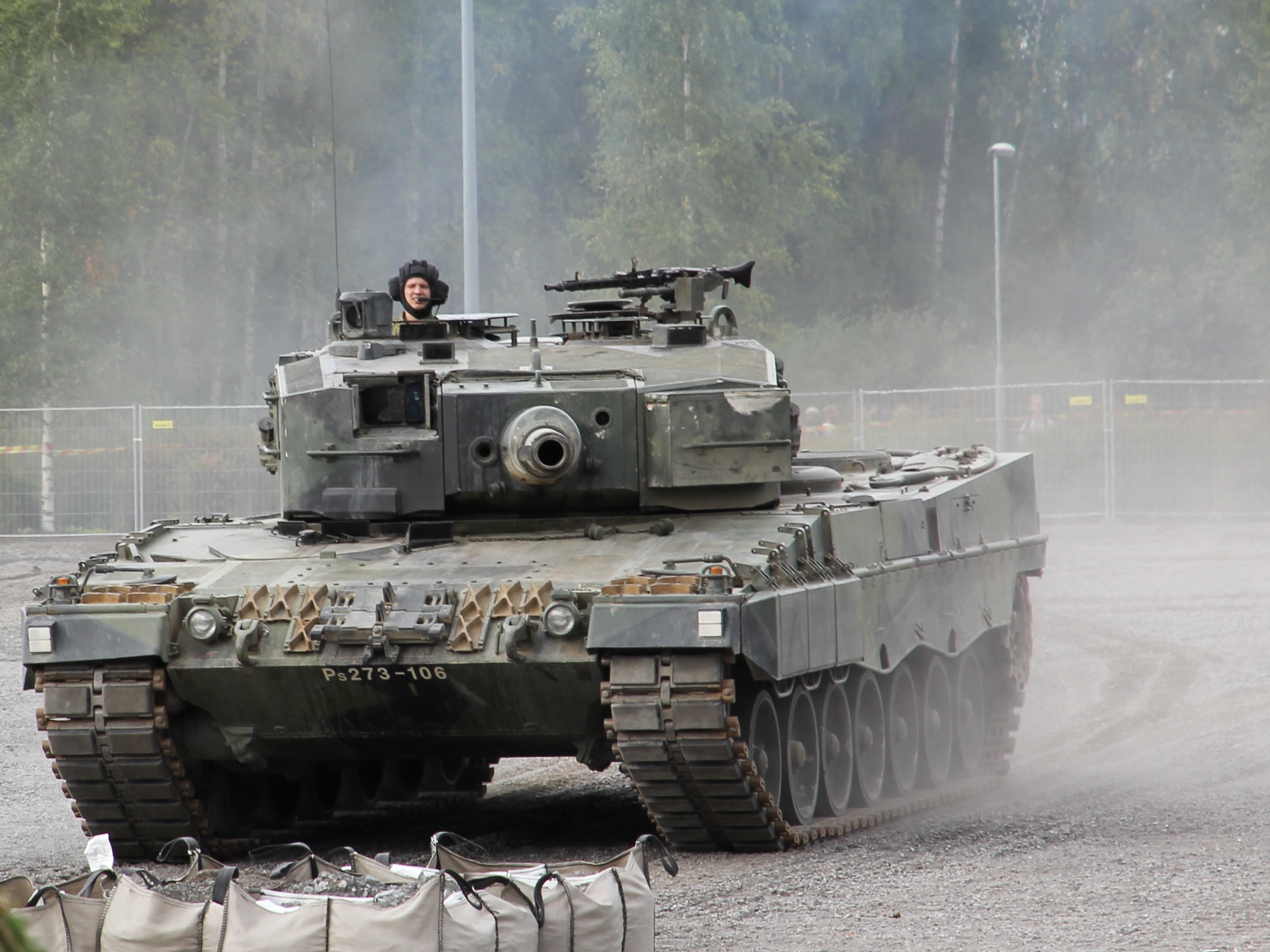
Finnish Army Leopard 2A4 MBT

- Leopard 2A4 including Leopard 2R demining vehicle and Leopard 2L Bridge layer
- Leopard 2A6 Main battle tank
- BMP-1 (Ex-East German, fully withdrawn from service, except Forward Observation variants BMP1TJ and BMP1 TTJ)
- BMP-2MD (Operational, acquired from East-German surplus stocks)
- Marksman (Self-propelled anti-aircraft gun) (Marksman turrets are installed on modified Leopard 2A4 chassis, designated ItPsv90)
- Buk M1 known as ItO 96, Anti-aircraft missile transporter erector launcher
- 2S1 known as 122 PsH 74 (122 Panssarihaupitsi 74, 122mm armoured howitzer 74)
- 2S5 known as 152 TelaK 91 (152 Telakanuuna 91, 152mm tracked cannon 91)
- CV9030FIN Infantry fighting vehicle
- MT-LBV Armoured personnel carrier
- MT-LBu Artillery command vehicle
- BTR-50 YVI Tracked signals vehicle
- T-72 Ex-East German, fully withdrawn from service. Used as target dummies.
