= Finnish Defence Forces training brach insignia =

Shoulder insignia indicating a conscripts training branch in the Finnish Defence Forces

Training branch insignia (Finnish: koulutushaaramerkki) are shoulder insignia worn to indicate a conscript's training branch in the Finnish Defence Forces. They are generally received after successfully completing the branch training test at the end of the branch training phase, and are worn on the leave uniform. Special forces conscripts can have extra requirements, e.g. paratroopers receive theirs based on the paratrooper skill proficiency test during the unit training phase.

There also exist training branch insignia that are only allowed to be used inside garrison grounds, i.e. the cyber conscript insignia, or which have not been officially adopted, but are used during field exercises, i.e. urban engineer.

== History ==
Training branch insignia were approved by the Chief of Defence in February 1949, were commanded into use on 10 November 1949, and officially adopted on 5 December 1949. At first the right to wear the insignia had to be proposed by the company commander, based on the conscript's proficiency in their branch's skills, and granted by the commander of the brigade-level unit the conscript belonged to, with officer candidates being granted the right automatically. Additionally, the insignia had to be bought at the Soldiers' Home canteen for 55 marks. From 1950 officer students also were granted the right automatically, and since the summer of 1952 category B fitness for service could also receive it. At least 25 per cent of a company were required to be granted the right to wear the insignia, with it averaging around 75 per cent.

In 1962 the right to wear training branch insignia was given to all conscripts who had completed half of their service, and in 1965 it was even often given directly after the military oath.

The 1949 model, m/49, insignia were printed and stitched on a wadmal backing with thread coloured the same as the piping on the branch's collar insignia. In 1954 the insignia became weaved, and the m/62 insignia were glued on a cloth backing. In 1991 the insignia became smaller and started to be stitched to a velcro backing in order to attach on the m/91 uniform.

The m/49 insignia background had the colours of the unit the conscript was serving with the training branch symbol on it, leading to 142 variations existing, but in 1962 the colours were simplified to the main service branch that the training branch belongs to. Additionally many specialist insignia, such as machine gunner, submachine gunner, and tank commander were discontinued in the same reform.

The insignia were originally attached a match's distance from the left shoulder epaulet. By 1955 this has shifted to halfway the upper arm, and since 1991 the uniform has had a velcro spot on it for this purpose. The standard, as of 2026, dictates that it belongs on the lower edge of the velcro, below the brigade-level unit insignia

On the original insignia, some training branches, especially ones that were likely to directly fight the enemy, had a double edge, with the outer one representing a wreath, likely symbolizing victory. This was removed on the m/91 insignia, as it didn't fit anymore on the smaller background.

Rangers and CBRNe got their insignia in 1960.

The photographer insignia was discontinued in 1965 when training of conscripts for the task was stopped, and re-adopted in 2017 when training began again.

The CBRNe insignia was updated in 2003 to match the modern gasmask design.

Urban jaegers were authorized to wear their own training branch insignia in 2016, although it is not in the official catalogue.

The readiness units got their own training branch insignia in 2017, with a distinct version for service wear.

The logistics insignia was adopted in 2018.

Over the years around 220 training branch insignia designs have been in use.

== Gallery ==
=== Current ===
Current Army training branch insignia
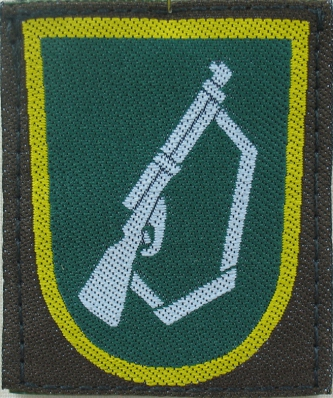
Jaeger (infantry)

Urban jaeger (2016-)

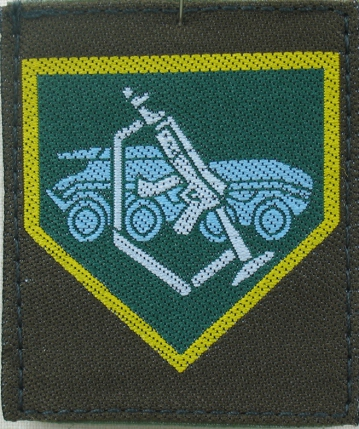
Mechanized jaeger

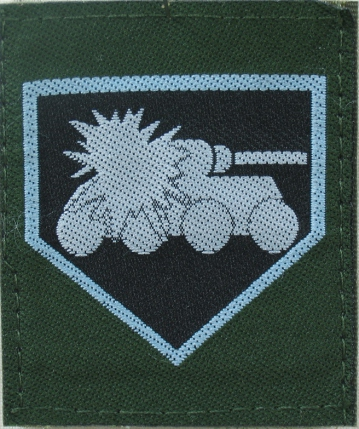
Anti-tank man

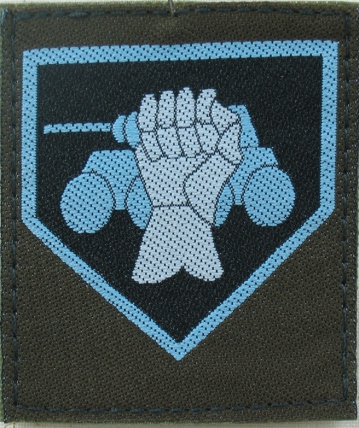
Tank crew

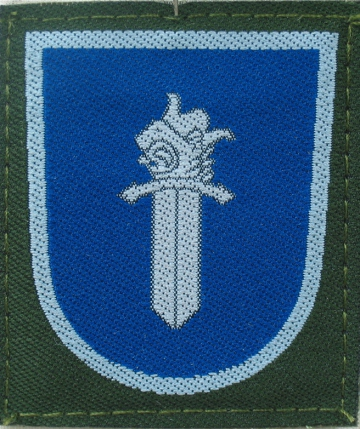
Military police

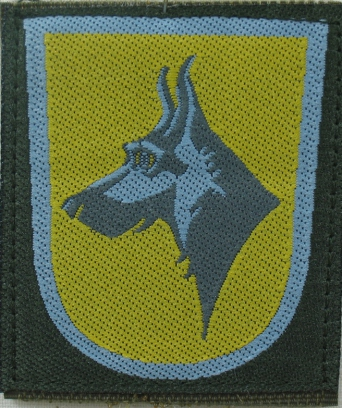
Dog handler

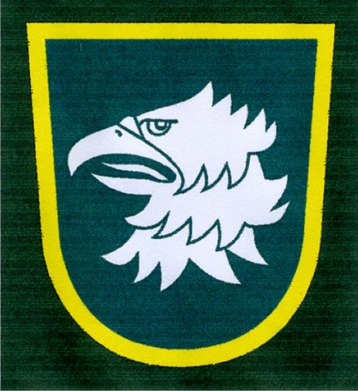
Coastal jaeger

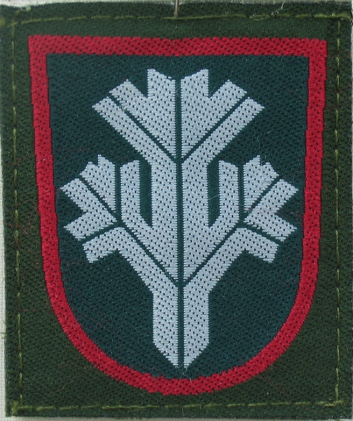
Ranger, reconnaissance (1960-)

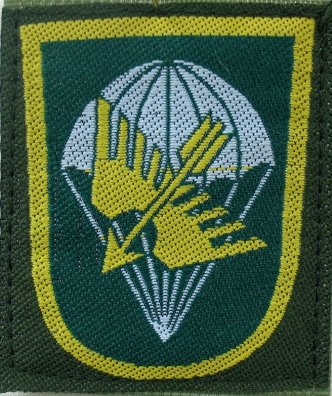
Paratrooper

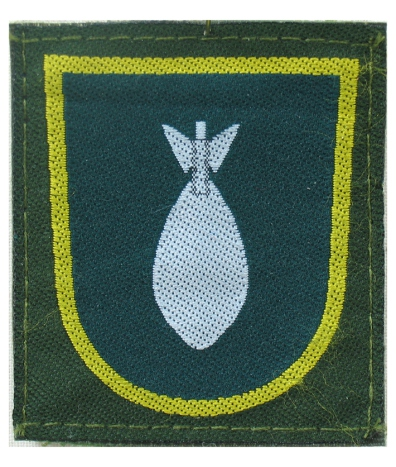
Mortar man

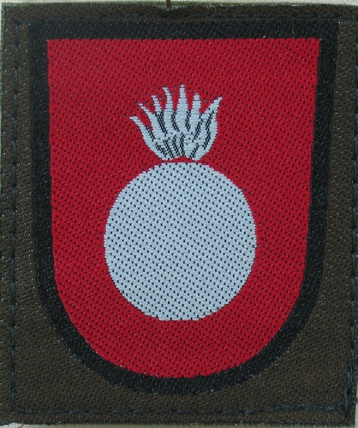
Artillery

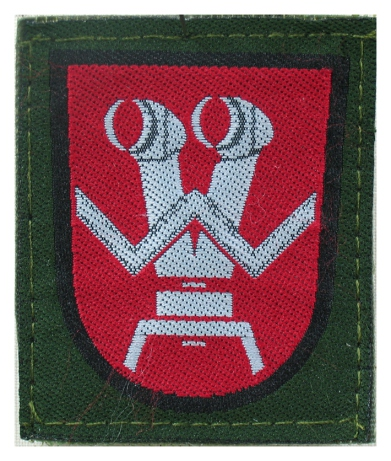
Forward observer

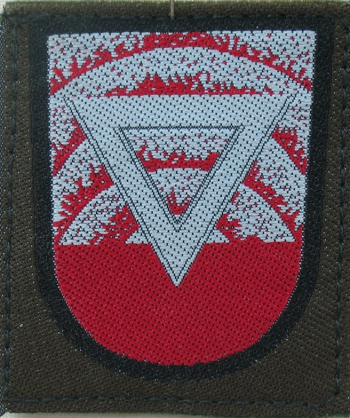
Counter battery radar

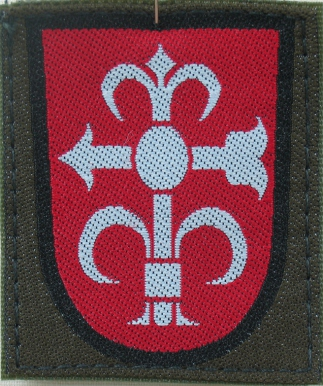
Meteorologist

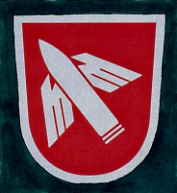
Air defence man

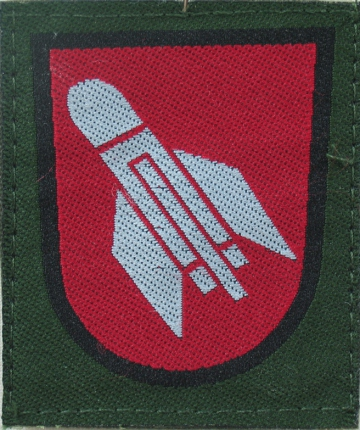
Missile man

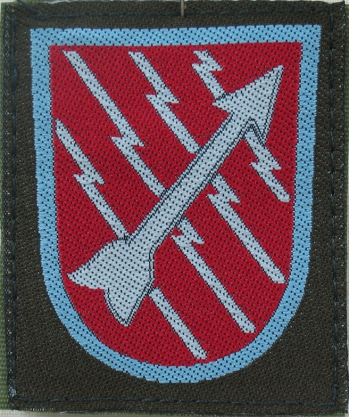
Radar man

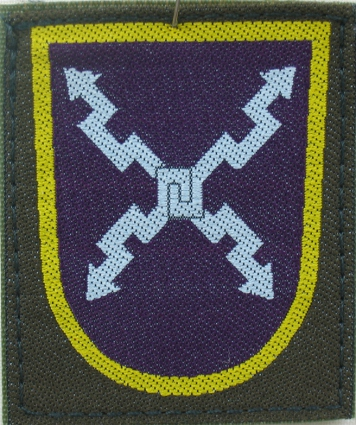
Signals (originally radio operator)

Electronic warfare

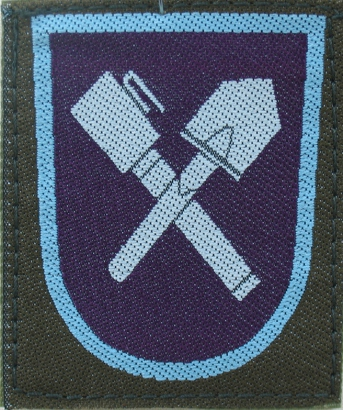
Engineer

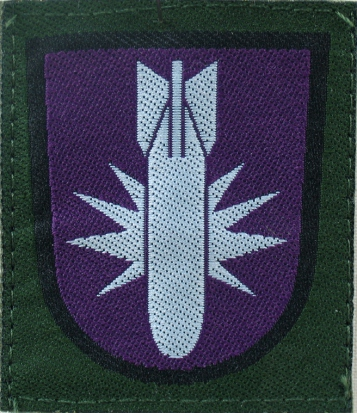
EOD

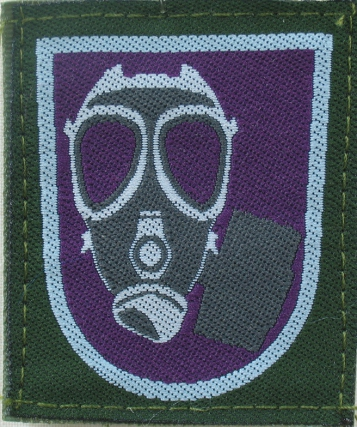
CBRNe (2003-)

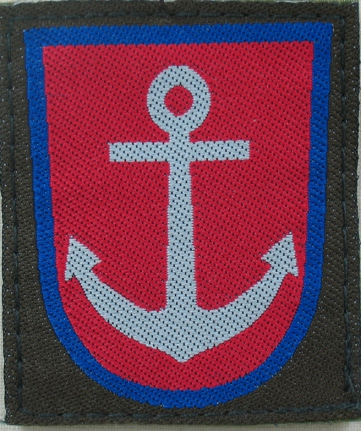
Boat man

Logistics training branch insignia (2018-)

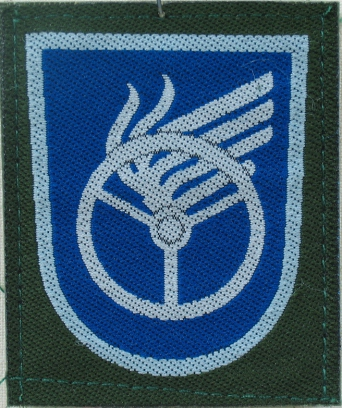
Driver training branch insignia

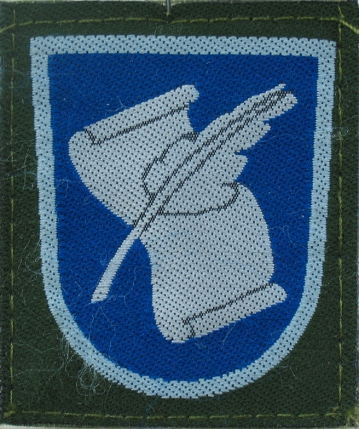
Scribe

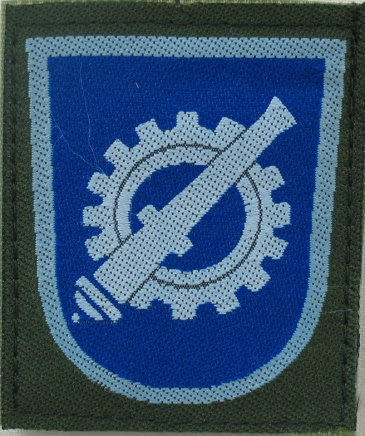
Gunsmith

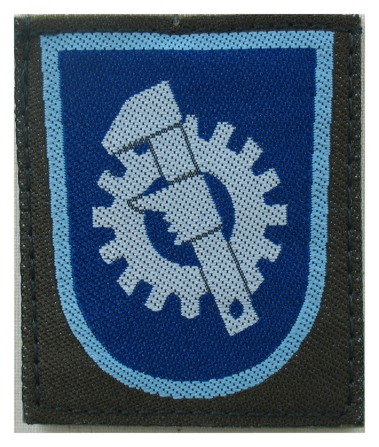
Mechanic

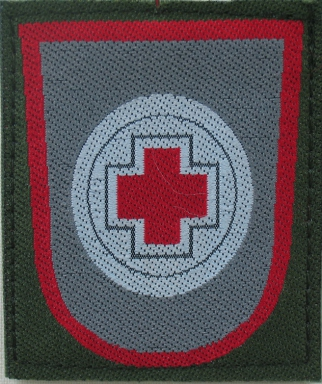
Medic

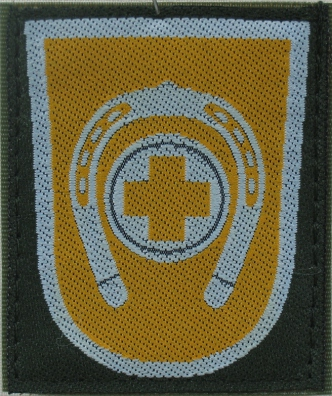
Vetinarian

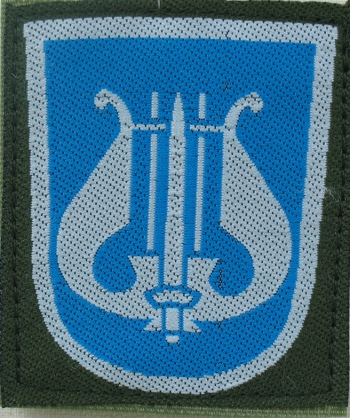
Musician

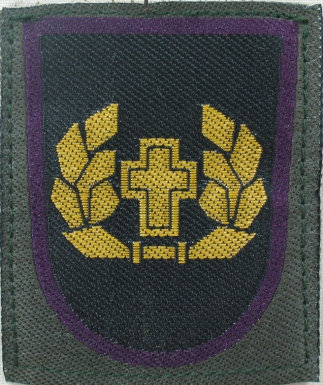
Conscript chaplain, military deacon

Photographer
Current Navy training branch insignia
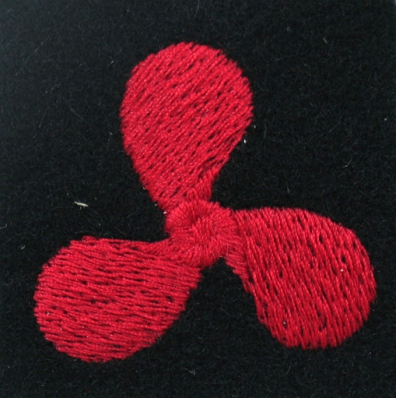
Engine, ship electronics

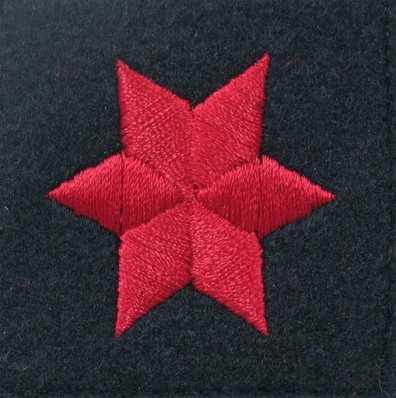
Logistics, driver, staff

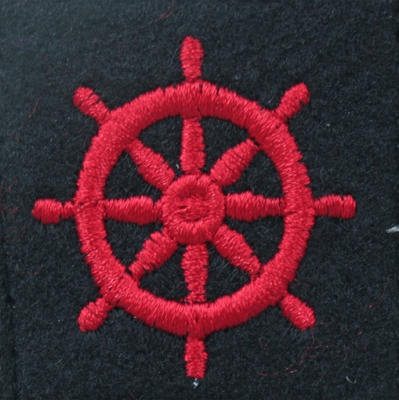
Seafaring

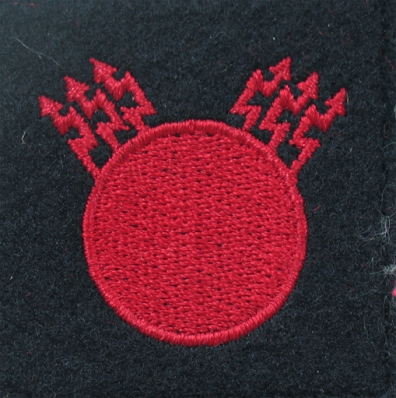
Mine

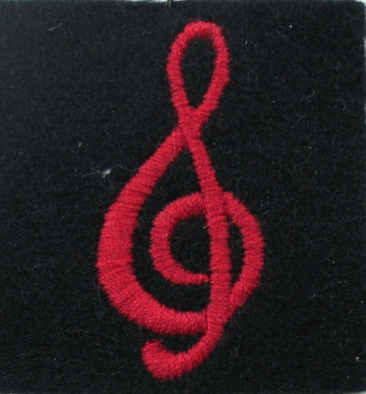
Musician

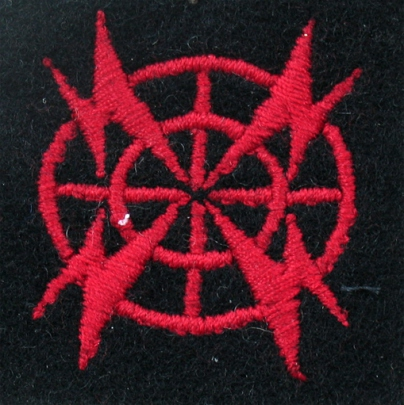
Combat direction center

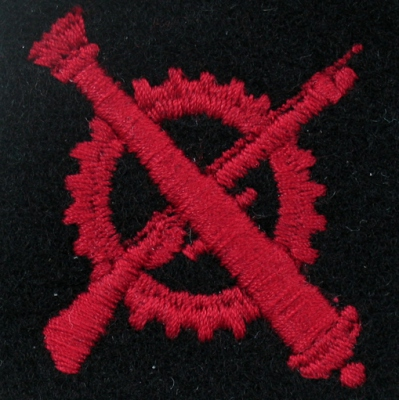
Armament

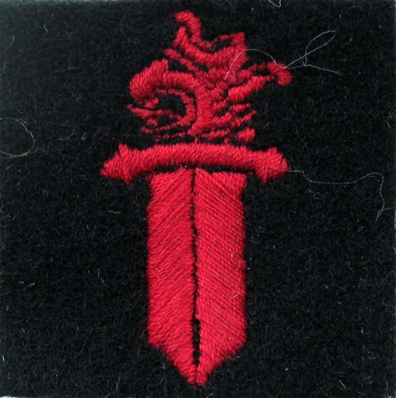
Military police

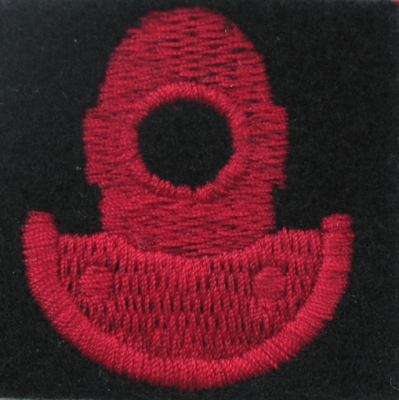
Diver

Photographer
Current Air Force training branch insignia
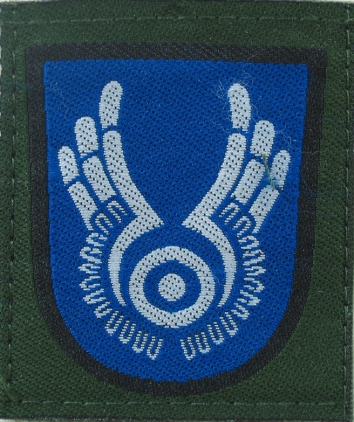
Student pilot

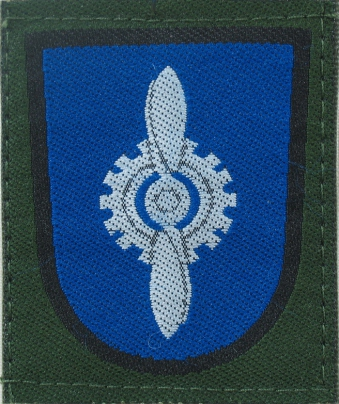
Assistant mechanic, air combat station

Photographer

=== Former ===
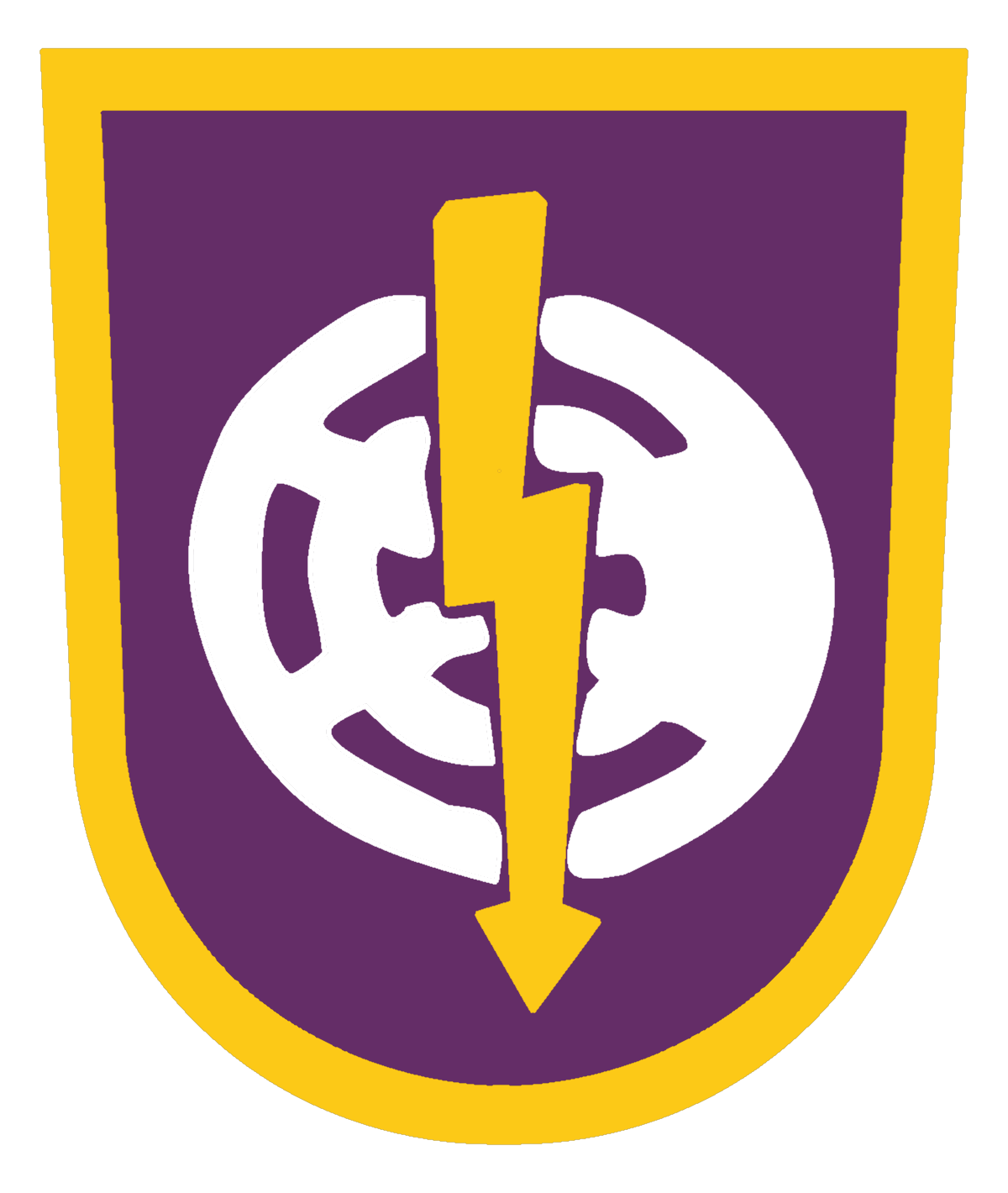
Telepraph man in a signals unit

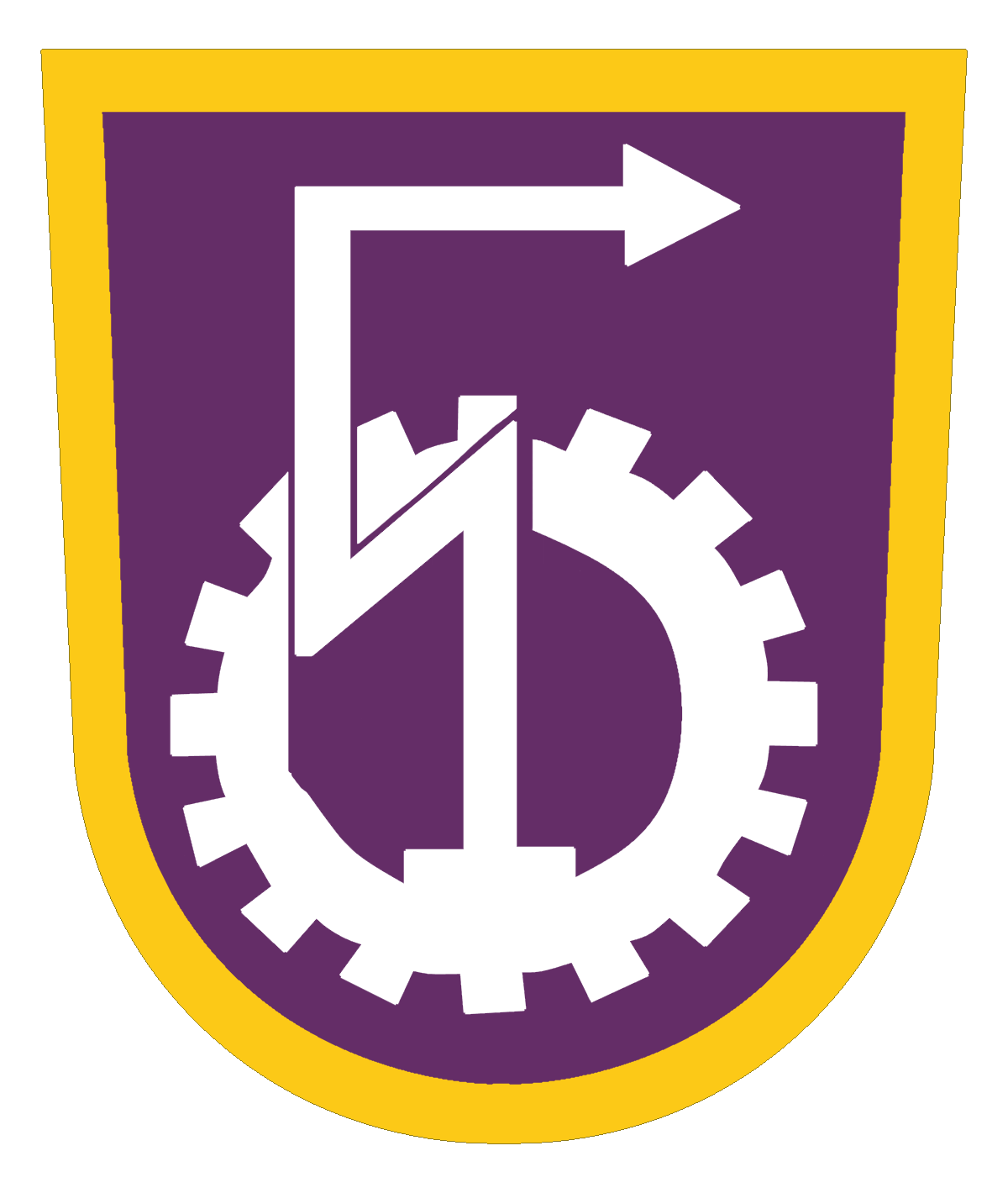
Directional radio technician in a signals unit (1960-1962)

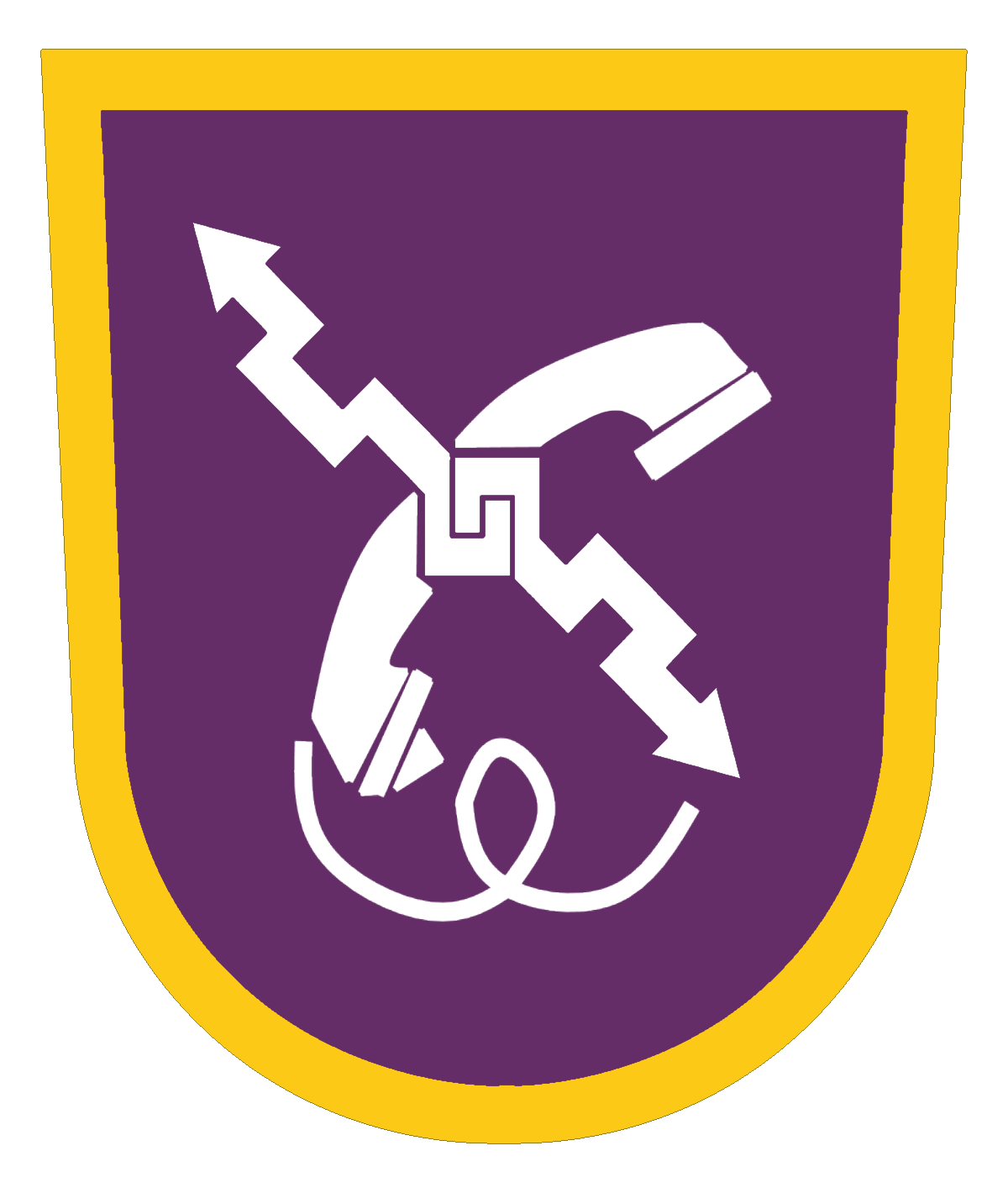
Telephone man in a signals unit

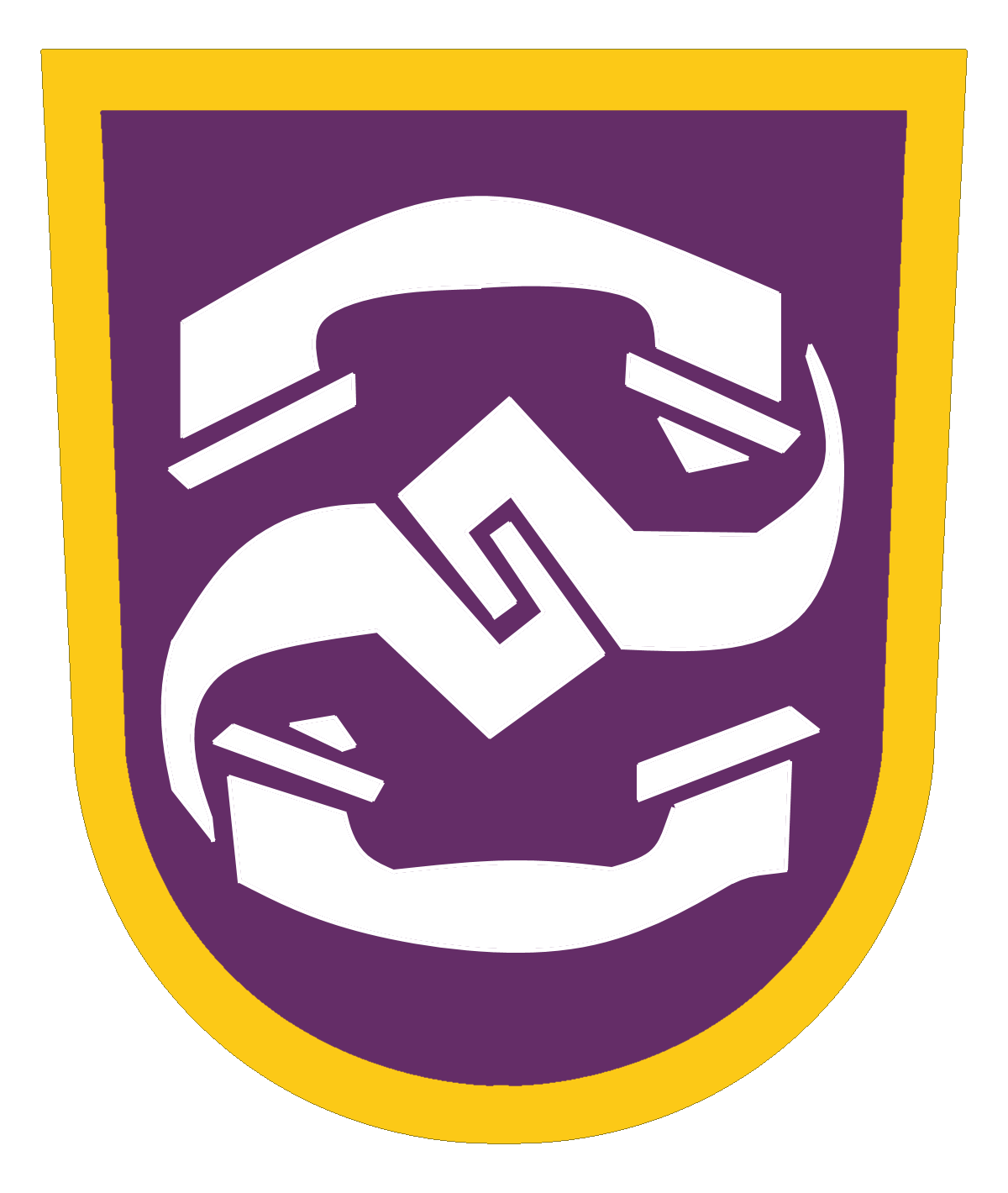
Telephone exchange man in a signals unit (1957-1962)

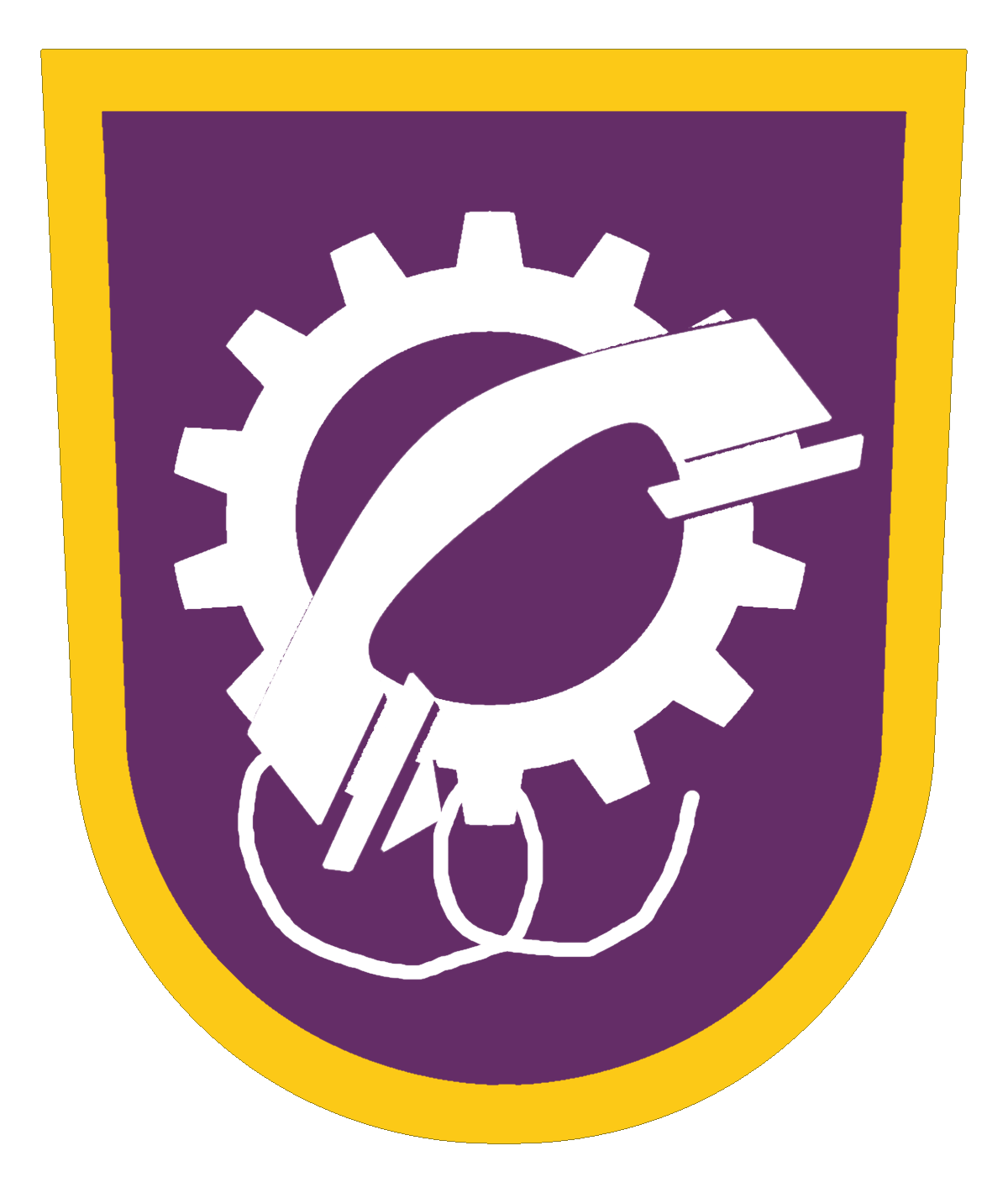
Telephone technician in a signals unit (1949-1962)

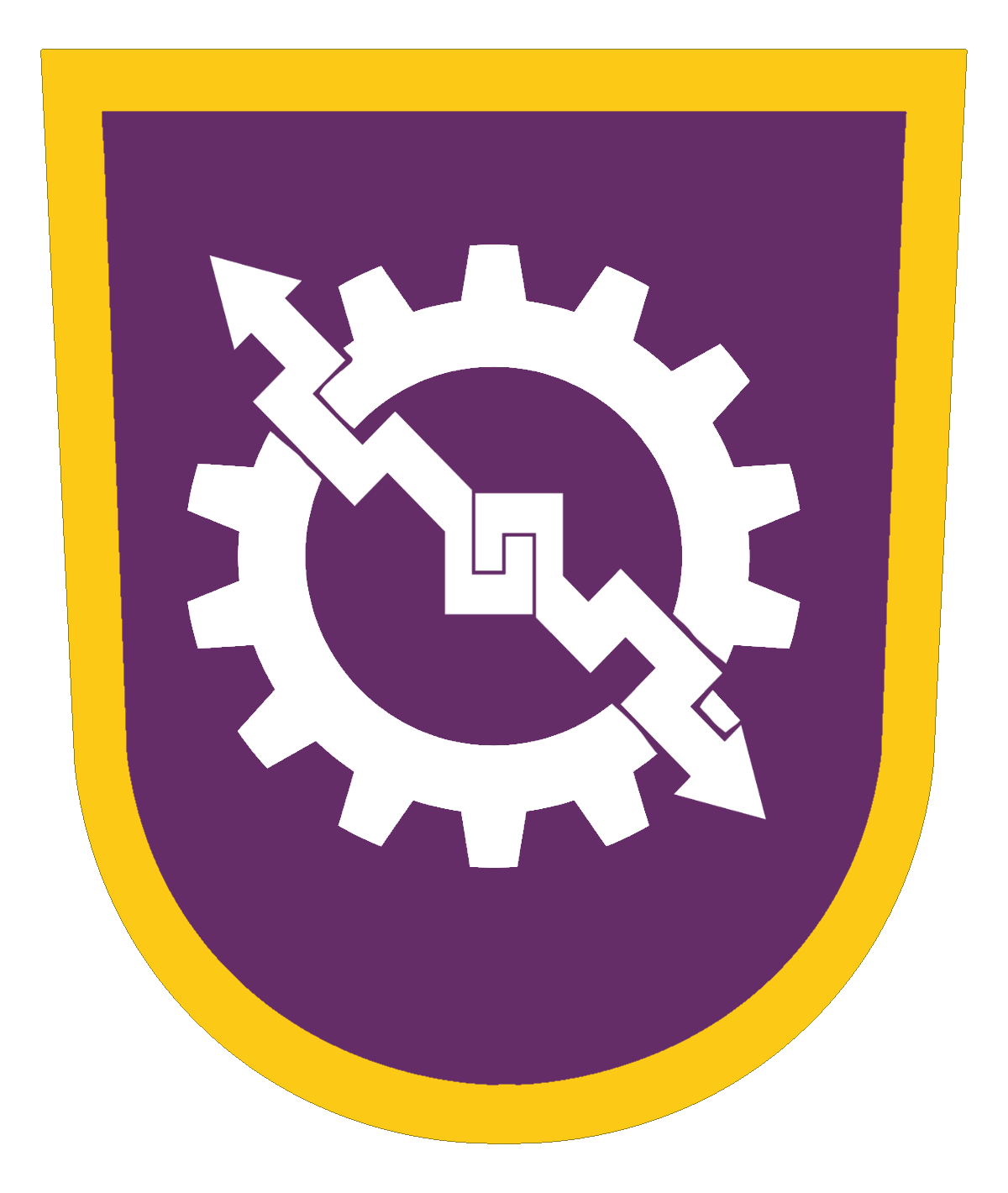
Radio technician in a signals unit

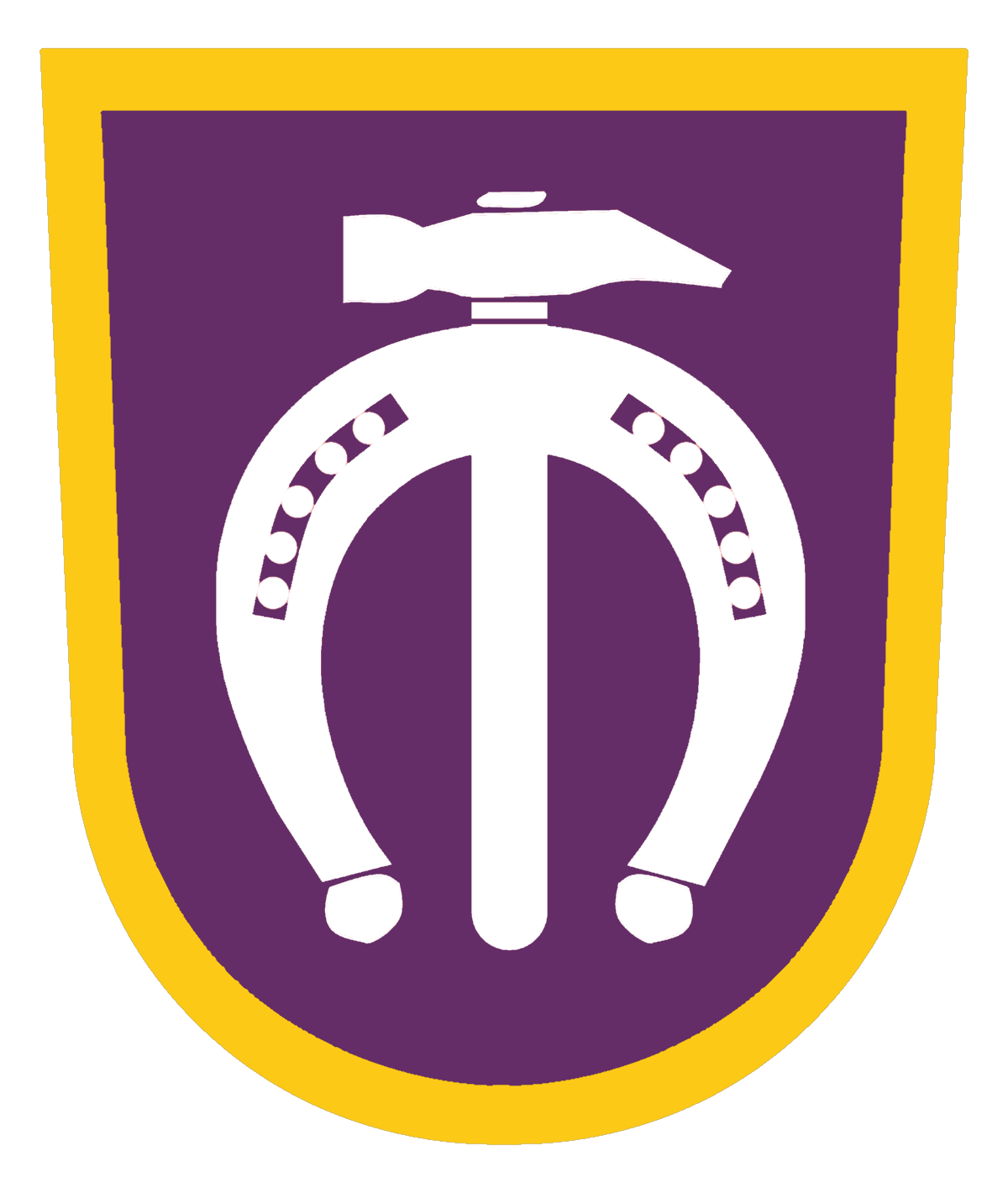
Farrier in a signals unit

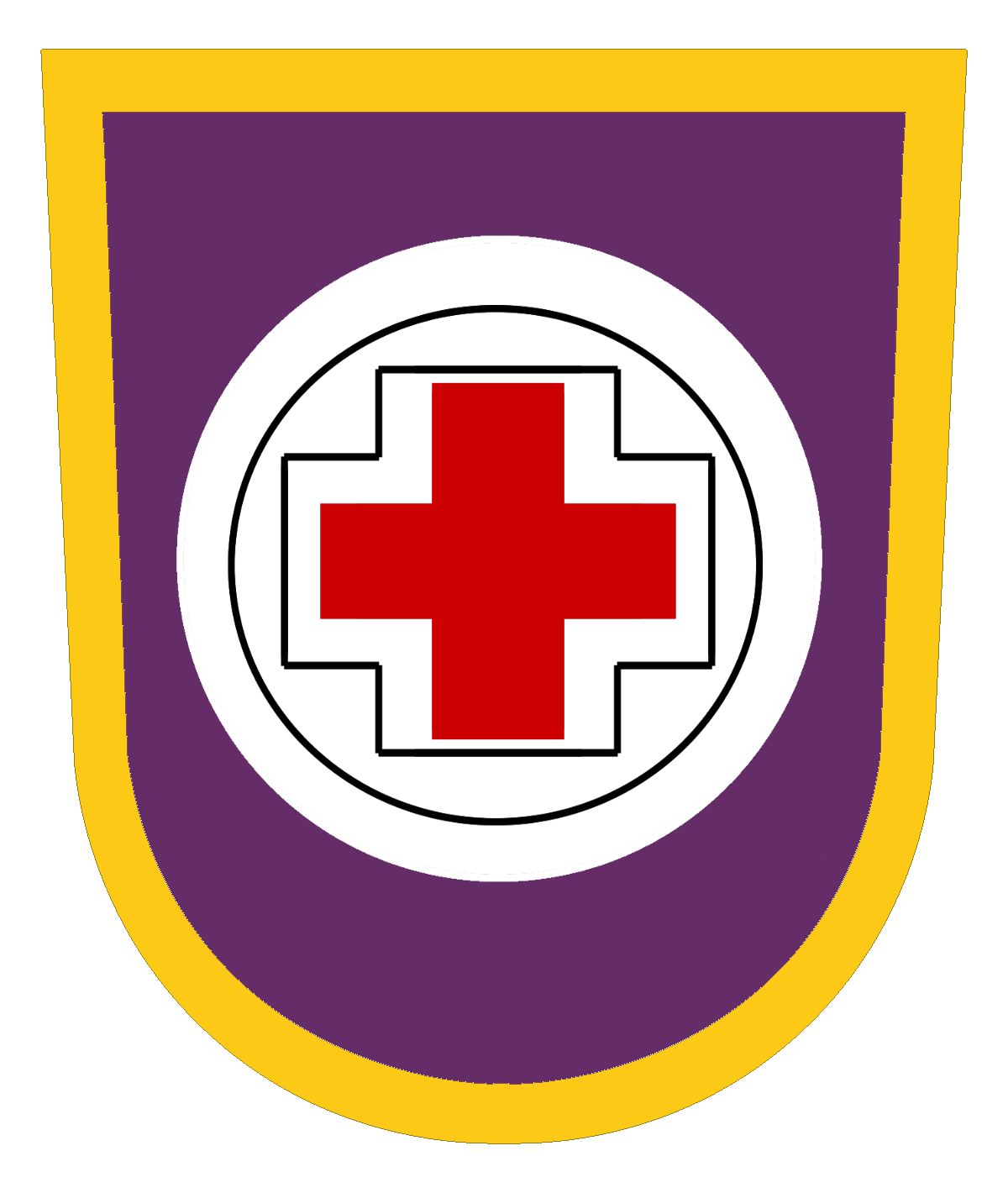
Medic in a signals unit

== See also ==
- Finnish military ranks
- United States Army branch insignia
