= Army Academy (Finland) =

Coordinates: 61.053660°N 28.168322°E

- Insignia of the Army Academy
- Active: 2001-: Maasotakoulu
- Country: Finland
- Branch: Finnish Army
- Type: Military school
- Role: Career, reservist and conscript training
- Size: ca. 600 career personnel ca. 430 "ordinary" conscripts ca. 110 3rd year cadets of the land warfare line ca. 700 officer students during reserve officer courses
- Part of: Finnish Army
- Garrisons: Lappeenranta, Hamina
- Colors

Army Academy (Finnish: Maasotakoulu, abbr. MAASK) is a brigade-level unit of the Finnish Army responsible for:

- organising the service-specific and branch-specific parts of studies of Army cadets in Finnish National Defence University
- organising the reserve officer training of the Army in the Reserve Officer School
- guiding the career NCO training of the Army
- organising other training for Army career personnel
- pursuing research and development activities.

== History ==
Army Academy carries the traditions of the Finnish Army NCO training that begun in the Vöyri war school om the 26th January 1918, during the Finnish Civil War. After the war, in 1921, the regular NCO training began in Viipuri, in the former Russian teachers' seminary of Markovilla where the Infantry NCO School was established.

After the Second World, in 1945, the peace-time career NCO training of the Infantry NCO School was restarted in Lappeenranta. The current Army Academy is the organisational successor of this institution. After the NCO corps was reformed as the warrant officer corps during the reforms of 1970's and -80's, the school was renamed first as Command, later as Defence Institute (Finnish: Päällystöopisto, Maanpuolustusopisto).

After the warrant officer education was phased out, the Defence Institute was reformed as the Army Academy, a brigade-level service school directly under Defence Command. The Army Academy received the responsibility for the service-specific part of the education of the Army officers. After the Finnish Defence Forces re-established the career NCO corps, the responsibility for their training was assigned to the Army Academy, too.

Since 2008, when the Finnish Army was established as a separate service, the Army Academy has been a brigade-level unit under the Army Command. In the organisational reforms of 2015, all branch-specific schools of the Army were merged with the Army Academy, where they sre company-level units under the direction of the Army Training Center, a battalion-equivalent unit. In the same organisational reform, the Reserve Officer School was downgraded from a brigade-equivalent to a battalion-level unit and merged under the command of the Army Academy.

== Organisation ==
The Headquarters of the Army Academy are in Lappeenranta. Otherwise, the Army Academy is formed of the following units:

- Training Center
  - Armour School (Finnish: Panssarikoulu), Parola
  - Artillery School (Finnish: Tykistökoulu), Niinisalo
  - Engineer School (Finnish: Pioneerikoulu), Lappeenranta
  - Infantry School (Finnish: Jalkaväkikoulu), Lappeenranta
  - Signals School (Finnish: Viestikoulu), Riihimäki
- Reserve Officer School, Hamina
- Dragoon Band, Lappeenranta
- Army Research Center
  - Hamina, most of activity
  - Niinisalo, artillery sector
  - Riihimäki, signals sector
  - Parola, armoured troops sector
- Logistics Centre (Finnish: Huoltokeskus), Hamina and Lappeenranta)

The Training Centre specialises in the training of the Army career personnel. The Reserve Officer School gives, in addition to the eponymous reserve officer training for conscripts and reservists, normal conscript training for infantry, reconnaissance, transport and military police conscripts in two companies which are located in Hamina.

Formerly, the conscript company in Lappeenranta, the Dragoon Troop (Finnish: Rakuunaeskadroona) which acted as a support unit for Lappeenranta garrison was, after the disbanding of Häme Regiment, the last unit bearing the branch colours of cavalry in Finland. The Dragoon Troop was disbanded in 2016, and with it, the tradition of Finnish cavalry ended.
