= List of former Finnish military units =

This is a list of former Finnish military units.

== Pre-independence ==
Unit	Established	Disestablished	Notes
27th Jäger Battalion (Finland)	1915	1918	Unit in the Imperial German Army composed mainly of Finnish volunteers.
Finnish Artillery Regiment	1794	1811	Part of the Swedish Army.
Finnish Guards' Rifle Battalion	1829	1905	Part of the Military of the Grand Duchy of Finland

== Wartime formations ==
=== Finnish Civil War ===
- White Guard (Finland)
- Red Guards (Finland)

=== Winter War ===
==== Army of the Isthmus ====
- I Corps
  - 1st Division
  - 2nd Division (former 11th Division)
- II Corps
  - 1st Division
  - 4th Division
  - 5th Division
  - 6th Division - attached on 19 December
  - 11th Division
  - 23rd Division - arrived in February 1940

==== Others ====
- III Corps
  - 8th Division
  - 10th Division (later the 7th Division)
- IV Corps
  - 12th Division
  - 13th Division
  - Separate Battalion 8
  - Separate Battalion 9
  - Separate Bicycle Company 4
- Swedish Volunteer Corps – Svenska Frivilligkåren, arrived in 1940
- Lapland Group
- North Finland Group
- North Karelian Group

=== Continuation War ===
==== Armies ====
- Army of Karelia

==== Corps ====
- I Corps
- II Corps
- III Corps
- IV Corps
- V Corps
- VI Corps
- VII Corps

==== Divisions ====
- 1st Division
- 2nd Division
- 3rd Division
- 4th Division
- 5th Division
- 6th Division – formed the 12th Brigade in 1942, reformed as 6th Division in 1943
- 7th Division
- 8th Division
- 10th Division
- 11th Division
- 12th Division – formed 3rd Brigade in 1941
- 14th Division
- 15th Division
- 17th Division
- 18th Division
- 19th Division – disbanded in 1942
- Armoured Division – formed in 1942
- Division J – formed in August 1941, disbanded in August 1942
- 1st Coast Division – a Naval Forces unit, formed in July 1944

== Peacetime units ==
=== Army ===
Unit	Established	Disestablished
Artillery Brigade	1992	2014
Central Finland Engineer Battalion	1967	2014
Häme Jaeger Battalion	1918	2003
Häme Regiment	1986	2014
North Karelia Brigade	1990	2013
Pohja Brigade	1957	1998
Pohjanmaa Artillery Regiment	1957	1998
Savo Brigade	1775	2006
Signal Regiment	1938	2014

=== Navy ===
Unit	Established	Disestablished
Archipelago Sea Naval Command	1998	2014
Gulf of Finland Naval Command	1998	2014
Coastal Jaeger Battalion	1960	1989
Finnish Ladoga Naval Detachment	1920	1944
Hanko Coastal Artillery Battalion	1952	2002
Kotka Coastal Artillery Battalion	1952	2013
Vaasa Coastal Artillery Battalion	1952	1998
Turku Coastal Regiment	1939	1998

=== Air Force ===
Unit	Established	Disestablished
Training Air Wing	1918	2015
Aircraft and Weapon Systems Training Wing	1923	2013
Häme Air Command	1957	1974
Flying Regiment 1	1938	1952
Flying Regiment 2	1938	1952
Flying Regiment 3	1938	1952
Flying Regiment 4	1938	1952
Reconnaissance Squadron		1996

== See also ==
- List of military units in Finnish Defense Forces
