= List of Finnish Army units =

The Finnish Army is organised into four military provinces: southern, western, eastern and northern. The military provinces are responsible for defence and planning in their areas. The four military provinces are further divided into 22 regional offices or regional military provinces which are responsible for conscription, organizing the local defence and aiding the voluntary defence organizations. The Army is commanded by Lieutenant General Pasi Välimäki, who succeeded Petri Hulkko on January 1, 2022. Logistics is centrally planned by the Army Materiel Command, which has one logistics regiment in each military province.

== Organisation today ==
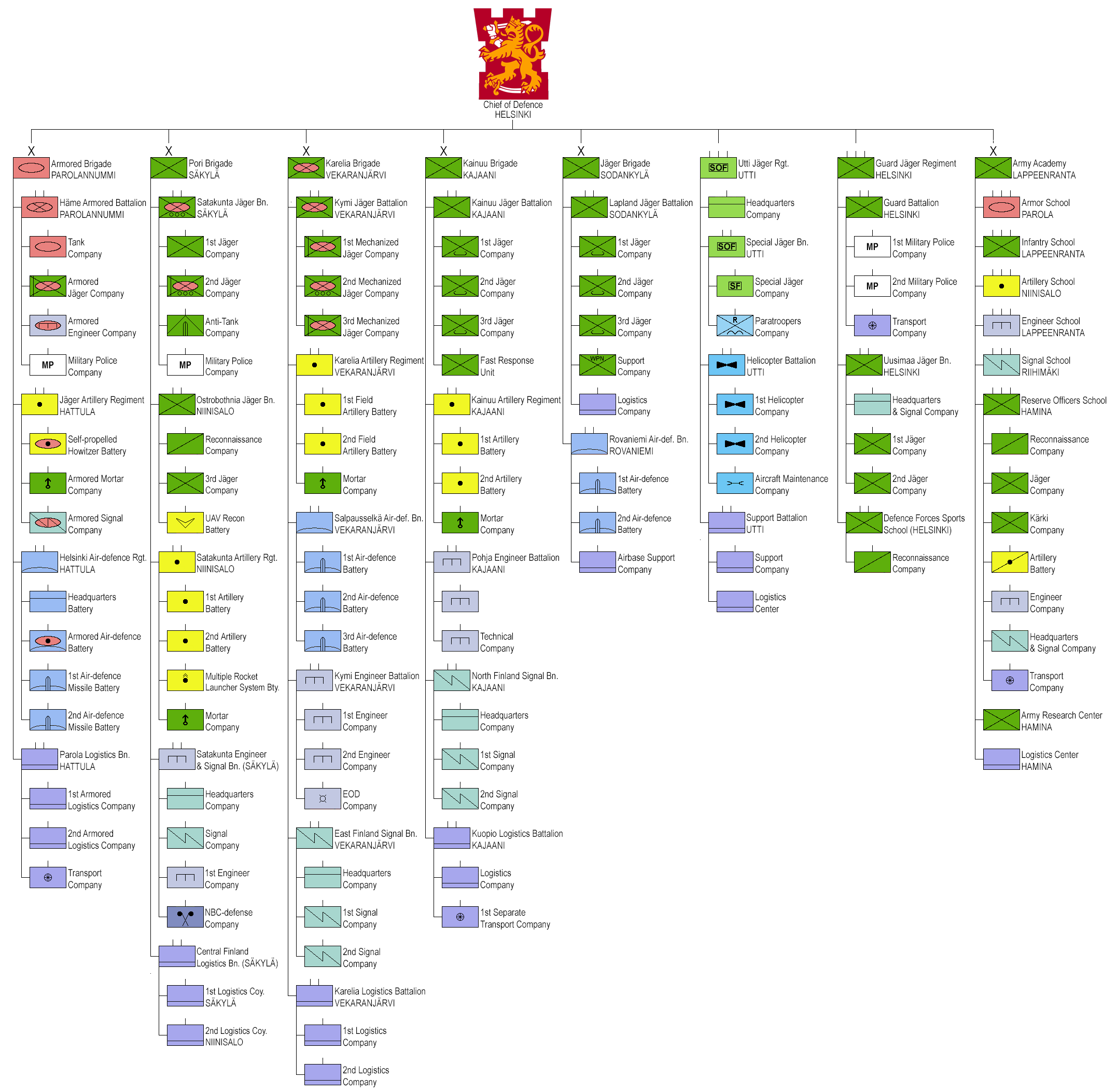
Peacetime organisation of the Finnish Army (click to enlarge)

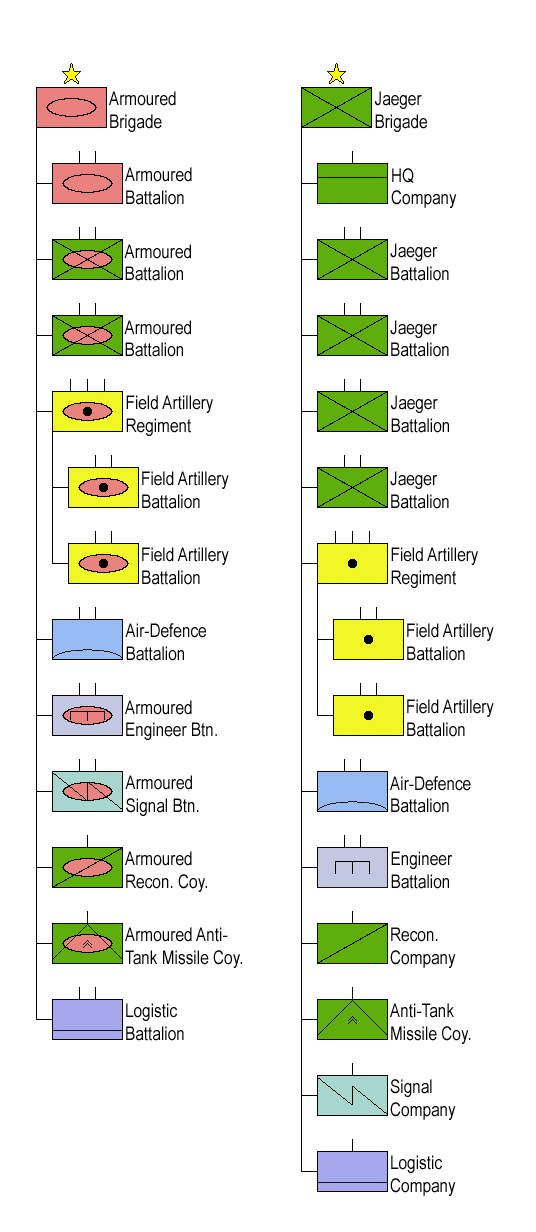
Wartime brigade organisation (click to enlarge)

- Guard Jaeger Regiment (Santahamina, Helsinki)
- Armoured Brigade (Parolannummi, Hattula)
- Pori Brigade (Huovinrinne, Säkylä) (Readiness brigade)
- Karelia Brigade (Vekaranjärvi, Valkeala) (Readiness brigade)
- Army Academy (Hamina)
- Kainuu Brigade (Hoikankangas, Kajaani) (Readiness brigade)
- Jaeger Brigade (Sodankylä)
- Utti Jaeger Regiment

Since 1998, the amphibious Nyland Brigade is part of the Finnish Navy.

== Wartime organization ==
In wartime, the army is composed of Jaeger, Infantry and Armoured Brigades. Jaeger and infantry brigades serve different wartime purposes, jaegers being more mobile while infantry brigades being equipped with older equipment. Three of the Jaeger brigades are special Readiness brigades with rapid reaction capability. They are more mobile and more heavily armed than the ordinary jaeger brigades, and have a higher proportion of regular to reservist personnel; there is one readiness brigade for each of Finland's 3 territorial commands.

Wartime strength of the Army is 237,000, of which 61,000 are in Operational Units and 176,000 are in Regional Units.

Operational units:

- 3 Readiness Brigades (Jaeger Brigade 2005 type)
- 2 Jaeger Brigades (Jaeger Brigade 91 type)
- 2 Mechanized Battle Groups
- 2 Motorized Battle Groups
- 1 Helicopter Battalion
- 1 Special Forces Battalion (Erikoisjääkäripataljoona)
- 1 Anti-Aircraft formation

Regional units:

- 6 Infantry Brigades (Infantry Brigade 80 type)
- 14 Independent Battalions and Battle Groups
- 28 Local Defence units and Volunteer reserve units (Maakuntajoukot)

== Future ==
Future organization for decade starting from 2010 is slated to have:

- 1 Army Corps HQ
- 3 Readiness Brigades
- 2 Mechanized Battle Groups
- 1 Helicopter Battalion
- 1 Special Forces Battalion
- 5 Regional Combat Groups

== See also ==
- Finnish Army
- Equipment of the Finnish Army
- List of Finnish corps in the Winter War
- List of Finnish divisions in the Winter War
