= List of military units in Finnish Defense Forces =

This is a list of all the military units in Finnish Defense Forces.

== List of Military Units ==
Army
Name	Municipality	Notes
Army Command	Mikkeli	HQ
Jaeger Brigade	Sodankylä, Rovaniemi	Arctic Warfare Unit
Kainuu Brigade	Kajaani	Readiness Brigade
Karelia Brigade	Kouvola	Readiness Brigade
Armoured Brigade	Parola	Mechanized Electronic Warfare Unit
Pori Brigade	Säkylä, Niinisalo	Readiness Brigade
Army Academy	Lappeenranta, Hamina	Armed Military Academy
Utti Jaeger Regiment	Kouvola	Special Forces And Helicopter Unit
Guard Jaeger Regiment	Helsinki	Urban Warfare Unit

Air Force
Name	Municipality	Notes
Air Force Command	Jyväskylä	HQ
Lapland Air Command	Rovaniemi	Fighter Wing
Air Force Academy	Jyväskylä	Armed Military Academy
Karelia Air Command	Kuopio	Fighter Wing
Satakunta Air Command	Tampere	Transport Wing

Navy
Name	Municipality	Notes
Navy Command	Turku	HQ
Coastal Brigade	Kirkkonummi	Maritime Surveillance Unit
Nyland Brigade	Raseborg	Marine Unit
Naval Academy	Helsinki	Military Academy
Coastal Fleet	Turku	Naval Fleet

In total there are 3 HQ's, 3 Readiness Brigades, 3 Armed/ Normal Military Academies, 2 Fighter Wings, 1 Naval Fleet and various other units.

== See also ==
- List of former Finnish military units
