= Välimäki =

Välimäki is a Finnish surname. Notable people with the surname include:

- Hans Välimäki (born 1970), Finnish chef
- Jussi Välimäki (born 1974), Finnish rally driver
- Linda Välimäki (born 1990), Finnish ice hockey player
- Juuso Välimäki (born 1998), Finnish ice hockey defenseman
- Pasi Välimäki (born 1965), Finnish Army officer
- Sami Välimäki (born 1998), Professional golfer
