= Kainuu Artillery Regiment =

- Kainuun Tykistörykmentti
- Flag of the Kainuu Artillery Regiment
- Country: Finland
- Type: Field artillery
- Garrison/HQ: Hoikankangas, Kajaani, Finland
- March: Hurtti-Ukko

Insignia
- Insignia of the Kainuu Brigade

Kainuu Artillery Regiment is an artillery unit of the Kainuu Brigade, which is the northernmost one of the three readiness brigades of the Finnish Defence Forces.

In its peacetime military training for conscripts, the Artillery Regiment uses: 81 mm light mortars attached to Infantry units, 120 mm heavy mortars 120 KRH 92 fixed on the NA-122 version of the Sisu Nasu all-terrain transport, the 122 mm towed Soviet howitzers (122 H 63), and modern 155 K 98 155 mm guns equipped with an APU to provide (minor) movement without towing vehicles. It also trains all artillery NCO's, including forward observers and mortar leaders.

== Organisation ==
=== Fire Control and Signals Battery ===
The Fire Control and Signals Battery trains Artillery Forward Observers for 1st and 2nd Artillery batteries and Mortar battery, as well as Signal and HQ units to relay Forward Observation information to the Artillery batteries. In addition, this battery trains support units to relay/make munitions and food for Artillery batteries as well as for Fire Control and Signals battery. Fire Control and Signals battery also trains the Measurement Team that serves as "special operations" team for all 3 batteries. This team will be trained to be able to operate as Artillery gun crew, Forward observer team, Signal team or Supply team.

=== 1st Artillery Battery ===
The 1st Artillery Battery provides emplacement training for the artillery. The purpose of the training is to provide the gun emplacements and the measurement and command sections needed by the battalion. All conscripts are trained to use many different gun models. Some conscripts of each contingent are given training in the use of a rocket launcher.

Also some supporting functions are trained like: medical, financial, logistics and weapon maintenance.

=== 2nd Artillery Battery ===
The 2nd Artillery Battery has the same type of training as the 1st Artillery Battery, however those conscripts, who intend to complete non-commissioned officer training will be transferred from the 1st Artillery Battery to the 2nd Artillery battery.

NCO training is offered in the branches of: Gun Emplacement, Fire Control, Signals and Mortar. After Non-Commissioned Officer Course 1, the top students will be offered to go on to further training in the Reserve Officer School.

Those Non-Commissioned Officers training for maintenance duties will be ordered to the Häme Regiment, among others, for the duration of NCO Course 2 to receive training in their own special field. During NCO Course 2, students are given down-to-earth and efficient training focused on leadership and mastering the know-how of the training branch in practice.

== Achievements ==
In military training inspections the Kainuu Artillery Regiment has been the most successful of all of the artillery units in Finland. It had won in 2010 the following prizes:

- Prize of the battle groups (2010)
- Prize of artillery batteries (2010)
- Artillery general Nenonen's fire opening competition prize (2010)
- Prize of the mortar companies (no other contestants in 2010)
