= Sisu Nasu =

Nasu
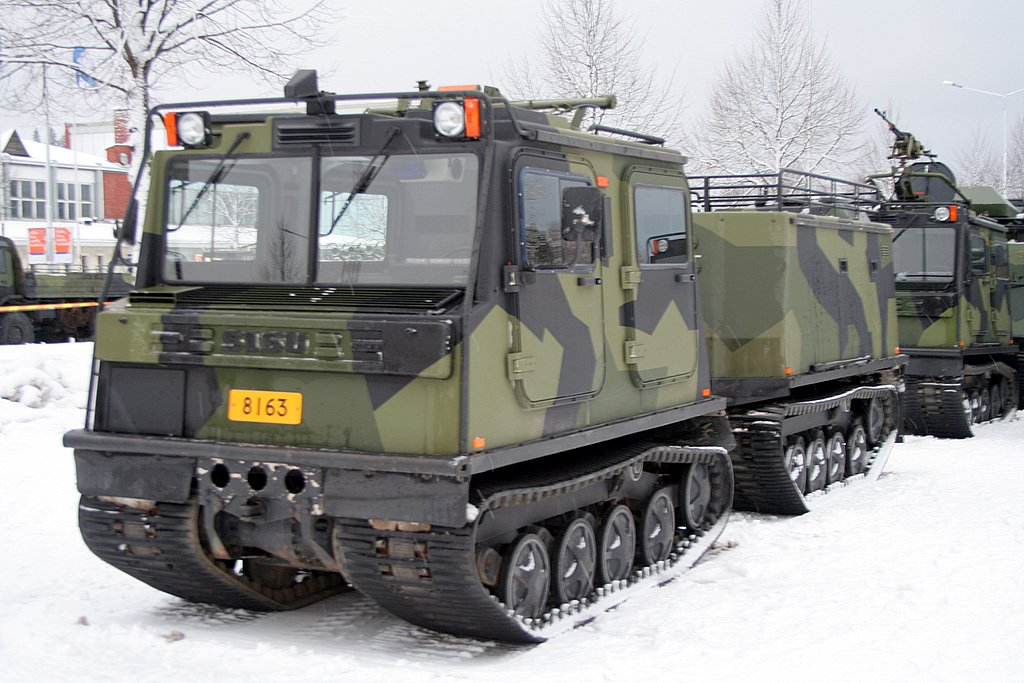
- NA-110
- Type: All-terrain transport vehicle
- Place of origin: Finland

Specifications
- Mass: 5,250 kg (11,574 lb)
- Length: 7.67 m (302 in)
- Width: 1.91 m (75 in)
- Height: 2.38 m (94 in)
- Crew: 1 (+16 passengers)
- Armor: Kevlar lining
- Main armament: 12.7 mm NSV machine gun
- Engine: GM 6.2 L Heavy Duty V-8 diesel engine 113 kW (154 PS; 152 hp) 346 N⋅m (255 lb⋅ft)
- Power/weight: 21.5 kW/tonne
- Suspension: tracked and all four tracks are powered
- Operational range: 280 km (170 mi)
- Maximum speed: 65 km/h (40 mph), swim 6 km/h (4 mph)

The Nasu (acronym for Nauha-Sisu, English: Track Sisu; also meaning "Piglet" in colloquial Finnish) is a tracked articulated, all-terrain transport vehicle developed by Sisu Auto for the Finnish Army. It consists of two units, with all four tracks powered. It can carry up to 17 people, although the trailer unit can be adapted for different applications (see Variants section). There are two main versions, the NA-140 BT and the NA-110.

The Nasu was tested in 1985, and in the following year 11 pre-production units were ordered. Since then, more than five hundred vehicles have been manufactured to equip the armies of Finland, India, and Turkey.

Although it looks externally like the Bandvagn 206, which also is in Finnish Army use, it is an entirely new design, and almost 1 meter longer and 1,000 kg (2,205 lb) heavier. It has better payload-carrying capability than the Bv 206. The Nasu is designed to carry troops and equipment through snow and bog-lands in northern Finland. For this, it is equipped with four wide (62 cm) powered rubber tracks. The low ground pressure enables the Nasu to cope with a wide range of difficult conditions. It is also fully amphibious, with a speed in water of up to 6 km/h (4 mph) when driven by its tracks.

The total load capacity is 1,950 kg (4,299 lb) and a trailer with a weight of up to 2,500 kg (5,512 lb) can also be towed behind the second compartment.

More than 500 vehicles of this type have been manufactured and it is used as a personnel carrier and a weapons platform (for BGM-71 TOW anti-tank guided missiles, 120 mm mortars). In basic infantry versions, a roof-mounted 12.7 mm NSV anti-aircraft machine gun is used for close-range anti-aircraft protection. There are also command, signals and ambulance variants of the vehicle.

== Variants ==
NA-140 BT
Manufactured between 1986 and 1991. Powered by a Rover 3,5 (3,9) V-8 gasoline engine (142 kW/280 Nm). Weight: 4,850 kg (10,692 lb), payload: 1,950 kg (4,299 lb), length: 7.55 m, width: 1.91 m (75 in), height: 2.30 m (91 in), complement: 5 (including driver) in frontal unit and up to 12 in tail unit.
NA-110
Manufactured between 1992 and 1994. Powered by a GM 6.2 L Heavy Duty V-8 diesel engine (113 kW/346 Nm). Weight: 5,250 kg (11,574 lb), payload: 1,950 kg (4,299 lb), length: 7.67 m, width: 1.91 m (75 in), height: 2.38 m (94 in), complement: 5 (including driver) in frontal unit and up to 12 in tail unit.
NA-111GT
A signal station version.
NA-120 GT
NA-120 GT KV1
Armoured variant used in UN-operations.
NA-122
A version that carries a 120 mm mortar 120 KRH 92 and 14 rounds on its tail unit. Called Krh-TeKa in Finnish Army service.

It steers by the use of a hydraulic ram mounted on the point of articulation. The ram is operated by a steering wheel in the same way as driving a regular car. It is the only type of tracked vehicle that can be driven on (UK) public roads without a category H track licence as it does not need the use of steering levers as in a regular tank.

== Operators ==
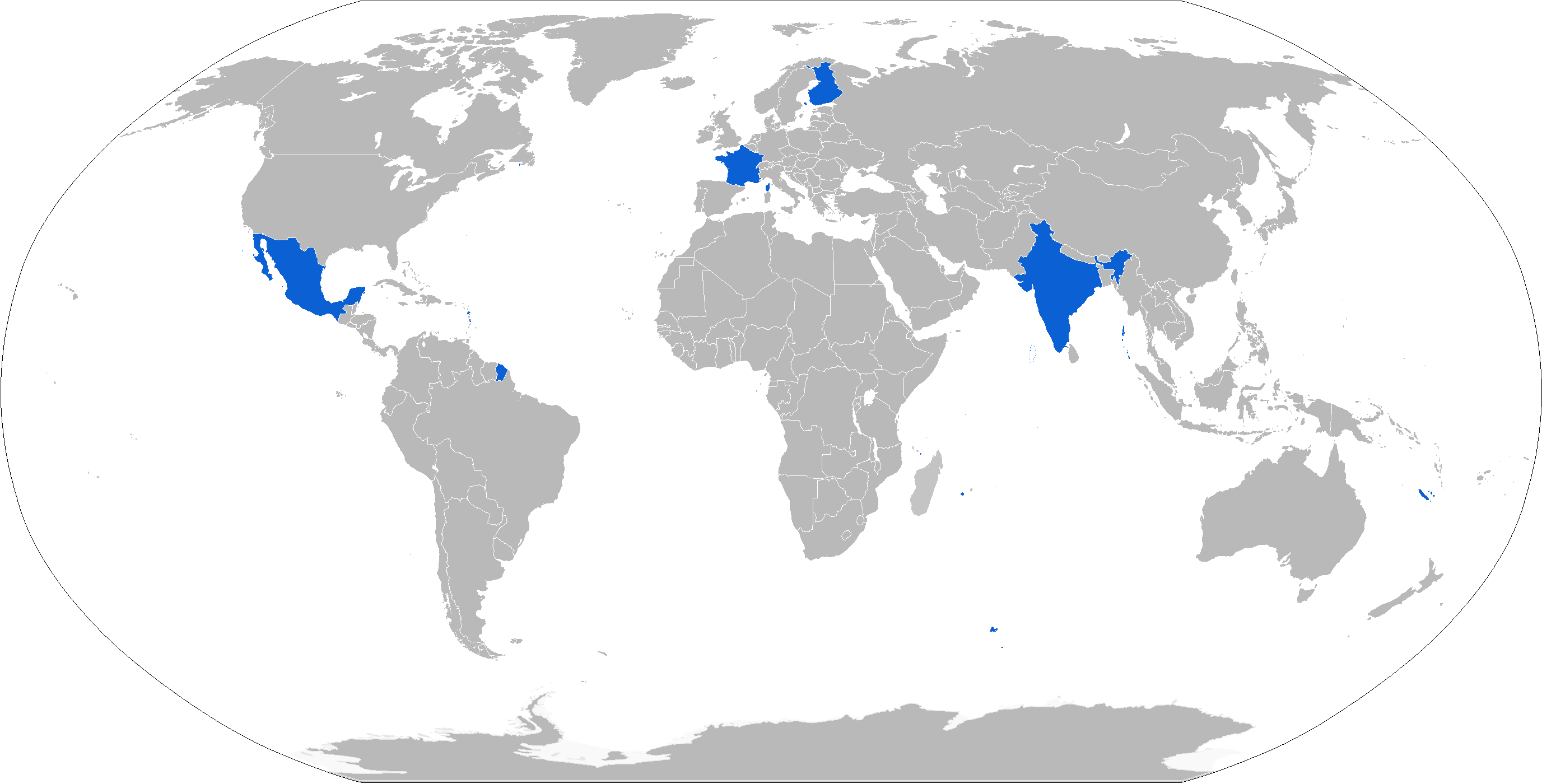
Map with military Nasu operators in blue

=== Current operators ===
Finland
Finnish Army. The Kainuu Brigade and the Jaeger Brigade employ the vehicle as their main transport vehicle. Further, most of the other brigades have a few vehicles each.
France
French Army (27th Alpine Brigade).
India
Indian Army
Mexico
Mexican Army Operated by the Mountain Brigade

=== Civilian operators ===
People's Republic of China
Woodlands Ministry (30 vehicles).
Finland
- Three (3) Nasus are used at the Finnish Antarctic research station Aboa.
- Several Fire Departments in Finland are using the vehicle. As of now, only 1 is still in operation.
Turkey
Gendarmerie General Command (47 vehicles).
United States
One Nasu is currently in use by the Davis County Search and Rescue team in Davis County, Utah. The Nasu was donated by the Diesel Brothers and was featured in the Discovery Channel series of the same name.

== See also ==
Similar vehicles with the Sisu Nasu ATV include:

- Bandvagn 202 – (Sweden)
- Bandvagn 206 – (Sweden)
- Bronco All Terrain Tracked Carrier – (Singapore)
- BvS 10 – (Sweden, United Kingdom)
- Vityaz – (Soviet Union)
