= North Karelia Brigade =

- Pohjois-Karjalan Prikaati
- Insignia of the North Karelia Brigade
- Active: 1990–2013
- Country: Finland
- Branch: Finnish Army
- Type: Infantry
- Garrison/HQ: Kontioranta, Kontiolahti, Finland
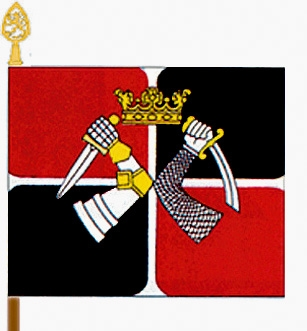
- Flag
- March: Karjalan Jääkärien Marssi
- Anniversaries: 20 November

North Karelia Brigade (Finnish: Pohjois-Karjalan prikaati, PKarPr) is a former Finnish Army unit that was situated in Kontioranta, Kontiolahti. The brigade was closed down at the end of 2013.

Annually 1500 recruits started their military service in Kontioranta. The brigade was the infantry centre of Eastern Finland: it trained soldiers to work in the roadless circumstances in North Karelia, Southern Savonia and Northern Savonia. The majority of conscripts were from that area. There were about 300 staff and career personnel. The last commander of the Brigade was Colonel Jari Kytölä.

== History ==
The brigade lineage goes back to 1941, when the 10th Brigade was founded after the Winter War. The brigade formed the 10th Infantry Regiment (Finnish: Jalkaväkiprikaati 10) during the Continuation War. Renamed 3rd Infantry Regiment, the regiment formed a Jäger Battalion (Finnish: Jääkäripataljoona/Jalkaväkirykmentti 3) in 1948. The battalion was first renamed the 5th Jäger Battalion in 1952, and then Karelian Jäger Battalion (Finnish: Karjalan Jääkäripataljoona) in 1957 before being renamed Pohjois-Karjalan Prikaati in 1990.

The brigade was disbanded at the end of 2013 alongside five other Finnish Defence Forces units.

== Heraldry and traditions ==
The brigade kept the traditions of multiple prior units, including those of the Viipuri Regiment (Finnish: Viipurin Rykmentti) and Infantry Regiment 9 (Finnish: Jalkaväkirykmentti 9). The oldest traditions traced back to Viipurin Lippukunta, founded in 1555 by Gustav I of Sweden. The brigade anniversary on 20 November commemorates the 1700 Battle of Narva.

The brigade flag consisted of a white cross, dividing the flag into red and black quarters. The cross is overlaid by the dueling arms and crown of the coat of arms of the Province of Karelia. Designed by Juhani Vepsäläinen, the flag was assigned to the brigade on 27 June 1991.

The brigade insignia consisted of the two swords shown in the coat of arms of the Province of Karelia on top of a laurel wreath. A crown adorned the top of the insignia. Designed by Juhani Vepsäläinen, the insignia was made official on 29 May 1990.

The brigade cross Piiluristi was confirmed on 24 April 1991. It was a red-and-black cross pattée overlaid by the dueling arms and crown of the coat of arms of the Province of Karelia.

The brigade march was Karjalan Jääkärien Marssi (lit. 'March of the Karelian Jägers'). The composer of the march is not known, with the melody going back at least to the 18th century. The lyrics of the march are by Elli Hallström, with the final arrangement by Arvo Kuikka.

== Composition ==
- Karelia Jaeger Battalion
  - Jaeger Company
  - Mortar Company
  - Sissi Company
  - Antitank Company
  - Headquarters and Maintenance Company
- Karelia Military Band
- Non-commissioned officer School
- Maintenance Center

== Commanders ==
- Colonel (1990) Ilkka Hollo Jul 1. to Dec 31. 1990
- Colonel (1991) Pekka Ripatti 1991 to 1994
- Colonel (1994) Lauri Ruonansuu 1994 to 1998
- Colonel Antti Lankinen 1998 to 2000
- Colonel (1999) Asko Kohvakka 2000 to 2002
- Colonel (2002) Keijo Simola Nov 1. 2002 to Feb 29. 2004
- Colonel (2003) Harri Ohra-Aho Mar 1. 2004 to Dec 31. 2006
- Colonel (2003) Viljo Hyvärinen Jan 1. 2007 to Sep 30. 2009
- Colonel (2005) Jari Kytölä Oct 1. 2009 to Dec 31. 2013
