= Kuopio Battalion =

Kuopio Logistics Battalion
- Kuopion Huoltopataljoona
- Flag of the Kuopio Logistics Battalion
- Country: Finland
- Type: Military logistics
- Garrison/HQ: Hoikankangas, Kajaani, Finland
- March: Hurtti-Ukko

Insignia
- Insignia of the Kainuu Brigade

The Finnish Kuopio Battalion is responsible for training of a reconnaissance and ranger unit and a maintenance unit of the Kainuu Brigade. About 250 to 300 conscripts and 160 salaried professionals work in the battalion.

== Logistics Company ==
The logistics company trains specialists for the supplies and transportation arms of the Finnish armed forces in Northern Finland, including Air Force and Border Guard personnel.

It also leads the courses for the special maintenance personnel, logistics platoon leader and war-time unit officer courses in cooperation with other logistics units.

The logistics company consists of

- supply and transport platoon
- maintenance platoon
- first medical aid platoon
- logistics service platoon
- command post platoon

== 1st Separate vehicle company ==
The privates and those to be promoted as lance-corporals will achieve BECE driver licence for heavy vehicles and the NCO course attendants BC driving licence. All those, who will graduate from the courses will get a certificate for 140 hours or 280 hours of civilian professional training.

== Maintenance center ==
The maintenance center is responsible of peace-time training and storing war-time materials according to the instruction of the Kainuu Brigade and the Northern Finland Logistics Regiment. It also support the troops production. The maintenance center has the leading unit, vehicle department, repair department, systems department and office.

== Transport Center ==
The transport center plans and leads the conscript driver training, the salaried personnel training and executed the special courses of the transport section. It also support the troop production of the battalions or units of that level. The transport center has three units: transport office, transport department and driver training center.

== Material Center ==
The material center stores, maintains, adds, evacuates and supplies the gun, electronic and economic materials and takes part in the crises time planning for diversifying the material storage's. It takes part in troops production. The units of the material center are battle material, electronics and food supplies storage.
