= Turku Coastal Regiment =

- Active: 1939–1998
- Country: Finland
- Role: Coastal defence
- March: Suomalainen veljeslaulu
- Anniversaries: 10 September

Turku Coastal Regiment (Finnish: Turun Rannikkorykmentti) was a Finnish coastal artillery unit operating in the Turku area and Archipelago Sea. It was formed on 10.9.1939 as Turku Sector (Turun Lohko) as part of the neutrality guard and later Winter War coastal sector system from a peace time 1st Independent Coastal Artillery Battalion (1. Erillinen Rannikkotykistöpatteristo). Turku Coastal Regiment was disbanded as an independent unit on 30.6.1998 and became part of the newly formed Archipelago Sea Naval Command as Turku Coastal Artillery Battalion (Turun Rannikkopatteristo).

== History ==
Following the naval losses in the Russo–Japanese War the Russian Empire began constructing Peter the Great's Naval Fortress, a coastal fortification system on the Gulf of Finland. Primarily built to protect Saint Petersburg, during the First World War Russia began to also fortify western Finland to guard against a possible German invasion. This fortification project resulted in the forts of Örö, Utö and Lypertö among others, which then fell into Finnish possession after Finland's Declaration of Independence. Åland had also been fortified, but the nine batteries built there were demolished later due to the demilitarization of Åland.

After Finland had gained independence the coastal artillery units of Finland were organized as a single coastal artillery regiment with three coastal artillery battalions: I battalion in Helsinki, II battalion in Vyborg and III battalion on Lake Ladoga. In 1919 these battalions were formed into independent coastal artillery regiments and Örö, Utö and Russarö became the V artillery battalion of Coastal Artillery Regiment 1 (Rannikkotykistörykmentti 1, RT 1). In a further organization change in 1921 units on the western Gulf of Finland and Turku were separated from RT 1 and formed as Turku Independent Coastal Artillery Battalion (Turun Erillinen Rannikkotykistöpatteristo), consisting of the batteries on Örö, Russarö, Utö and Lypertö. The battalion was later renamed 1st Independent Coastal Artillery Battalion (1. Erillinen Rannikkotykistöpatteristo).

== Second World War ==
Turku Sector was formed on the beginning of the Second World War as part of the Finnish neutrality guard on 10.9.1939 and before the general mobilization for Winter War. Neighboring sectors were Hanko, Satakunta and Åland sectors. Formation of Turku Sector is considered the beginning of the history of Turku Coastal Regiment. As the threat of war grew in Finland new and existing fortifications were constructed or improved, but lack of funds in 1920s and 1930s had resulted in neglect and lack of equipment. Coastal gun situation was satisfactory, but anti-aircraft guns were badly lacking and fire control and signaling equipment had significant shortages.

Organization of Turku Sector:

- Sector headquarters in Turku
- Örö fort and patrol area
- Utö fort and patrol area
- Bokulla fort
- Berghamn (Houtskär) patrol area
- Lökholma fort
- Pensar fort and training center in Nagu
- Kimito patrol area
- Lypertö fort
- Iniö independent patrol area
- Detachment Ravila
- Battalion Hällfors (formed later during Winter War)
- Detachment Hormio
- Detachment Brunila

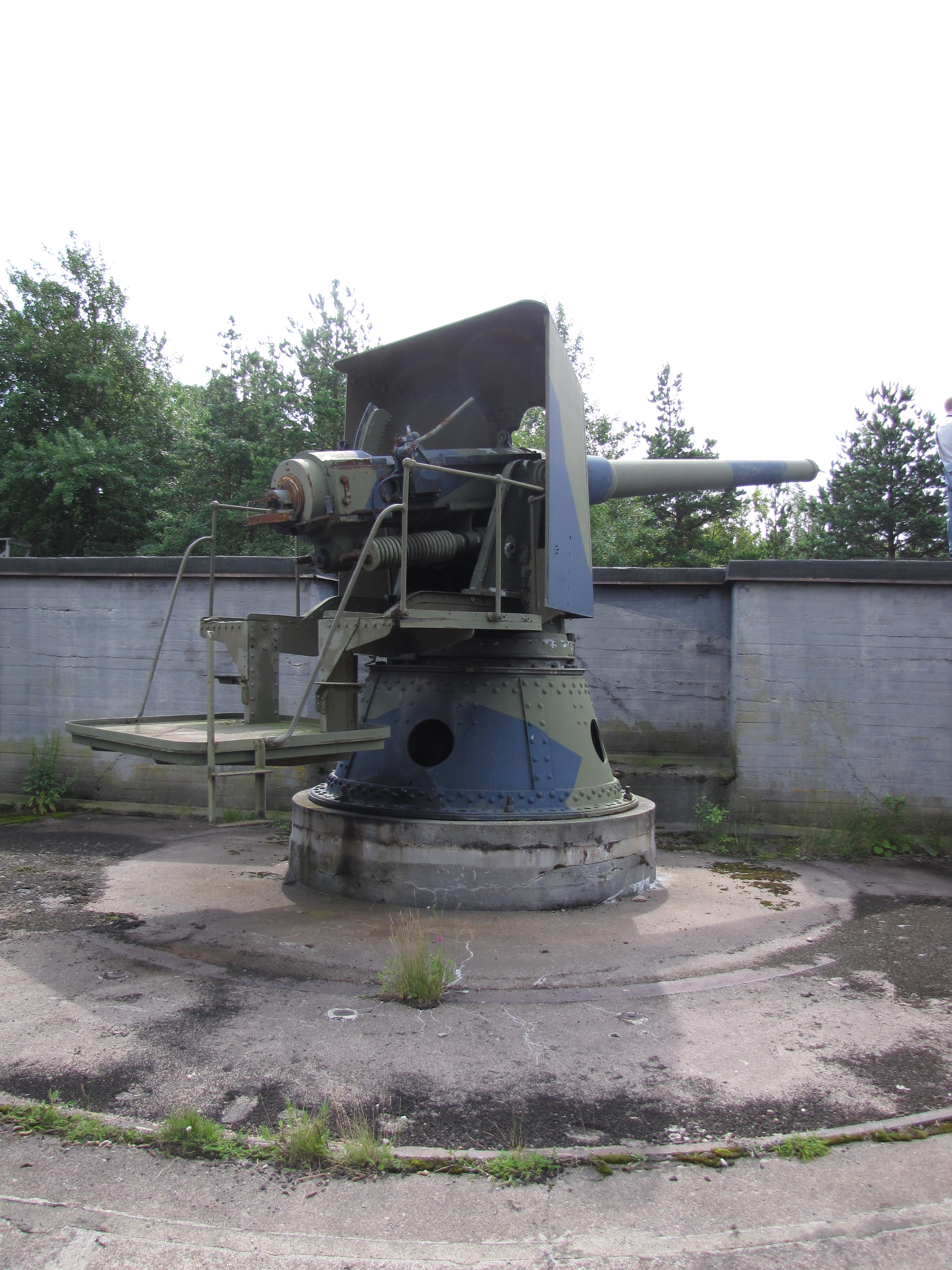
152/45 C coastal gun

Coastal gun situation in Turku and Satakunta sectors on 10.11.1939

- Turku Sector
  - Örö
    - 2/305/52 O Open positions, no armor or rear protection, camouflaged
    - 4/152/45 C Battery dispersed, protection improved, camouflage incomplete
  - Utö
    - 4/152/45 C Guns in row, rear protection under construction, camouflage incomplete
  - Bokulla
    - 3/152/35 Mk Guns on open rock without protection, camouflage incomplete
  - Lökholm
    - 3/152/35 Mk Guns on rock, frontal protection under construction, camouflage incomplete
  - Lypertö
    - 2/152/35 Mk Guns in row, no rear protection
  - Pensar
    - 1/152/45 C Guns on open rock without protection
    - 1/152/35 Mk
- Satakunta Sector
  - Reposaari
    - 2/120/41 AL Open positions, front and rear protection under construction, ammunition magazines under construction, camouflage incomplete
  - Rihtniemi
    - 4/87 K/95 Field fortified (mobile guns)

=== Winter War ===
The only battle of Turku Sector during Winter War was the Battle of Utö on 14.12.1939 when two Baltic Fleet destroyers approached Utö fort on an apparent reconnaissance and possibly mining sortie. Utö fort fired 31 shots against the destroyers, identified as Gnevny class, hitting one of them. An explosion was seen on the damaged destroyer covering the ships in smoke, after which only one ship was seen and the damaged destroyer was claimed sunk, but actually both destroyers survived the engagement. The destroyers fired 8-10 broadsides without causing casualties or even hitting the island. As the sea froze the later part of Winter War in Turku Sector was limited to air activity and assisting in clearing mines dropped from aircraft to sea lanes. Battalion Hällfors was formed from the personnel of Turku Sector and Turku naval base as an infantry unit to reinforce the defence on the Gulf of Vyborg in the last stages of the Winter War.

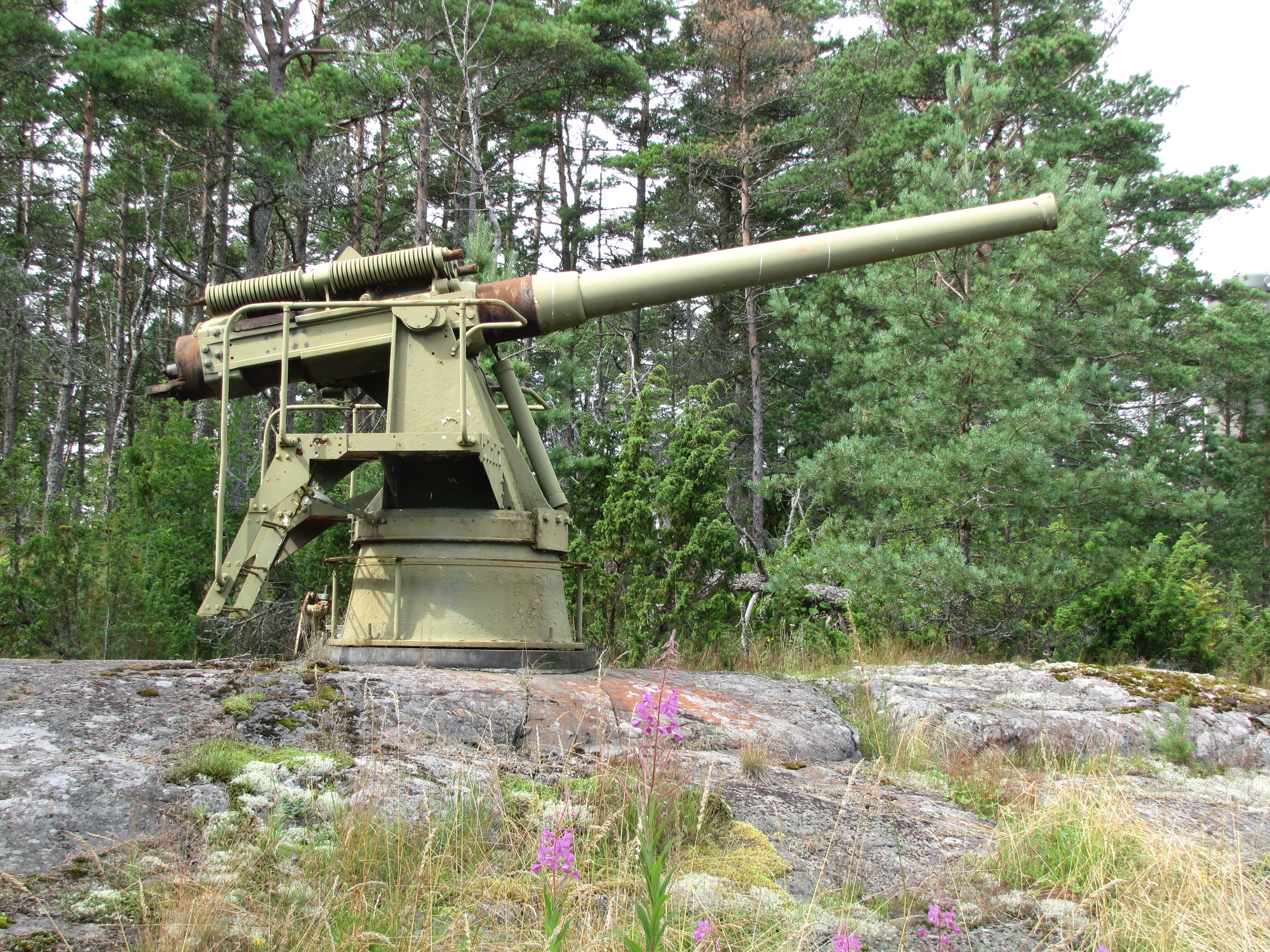
120/45 C coastal gun

=== Interim Peace ===
During the Interim Peace after Winter War Åland Islands was again demilitarized and fortifications constructed during war were demolished. Some of the guns sent to Åland were retained in Turku Sector and construction of new fortifications for them began:

- Alskär 2/152/45 C
- Jungfruskär 3/152/45 C
- Berghamn 3/120/45 C
- Isokari 3/152/45 C

Turku Sector was disbanded on 1.9.1940 and Coastal Artillery Regiment 5 (Rannikkotykistörykmentti 5) was formed from Turku Sector as well as Kuuskajaskari and Reposaari forts from Satakunta Sector. The shortcomings of Winter War were somewhat alleviated with training and improving the fortifications. Some of the equipment shortages were also eased, for example new signalling equipment was received. On 17.3.1941 the regiment was renamed Turku Coastal Artillery Regiment (Turun Rannikkotykistörykmentti). On the mobilization before Continuation War the regiment formed the 5th Coastal Brigade (5. Rannikkoprikaati) along with the 7th Coastal Brigade for the defence of Åland Islands.

=== Continuation War ===
At the very beginning of the Continuation War the 7th Coastal Brigade took up positions in the Åland Islands. The only significant event at the beginning of the Continuation War was the Battle of Bengtskär (26.-27.7.1941), where a force from the Soviet Union naval base in Hanko attempted to invade the island of Bengtskär. The coastal batteries of Örö supported the Finnish defenders, and a counter-attack force from the men from Örö and Hiittinen repelled the invaders. Otherwise the action in the area was limited to Soviet air activity. The 5th Coastal Brigade was transferred to East Karelia and reformed as the Lake Onega Coastal Brigade. 7th Coastal Brigade was thus the only unit remaining in the Archipelago Sea area, and it became the Archipelago Sea Coastal Brigade (Saaristomeren Rannikkoprikaati) on 1.3.1942. Hiittinen Sector, formerly part of the Hanko Group, became also part of the brigade. The brigade was reorganized on 29.4 as two coastal artillery regiments, the 7th on Archipelago Sea and the 17th on Åland Islands, plus Bothnian Sea coastal guard and units directly subordinated to brigade headquarters. With the Soviet Baltic Fleet trapped at the eastern end of the Gulf of Finland the threat for the brigade was low and the regiment headquarters were not established and only the most important forts were manned.

During the Soviet Vyborg–Petrozavodsk Offensive in 1944 units from Åland Islands and Archipelago Sea were transferred east to reinforce the defences there. To fulfill the ranks older men already released from service were recalled. After the Soviet offensive was halted on late summer of 1944 the defence of Åland Islands was reinforced to guard against a possible German invasion. While there were no clashes between Finnish and German forces in Åland Islands or Archipelago Sea area, a force of three German ships that had left Finland late were allowed to pass by the Utö fort on 19.9.1944, the same day that Moscow Armistice was signed. The German heavy cruiser Prinz Eugen along with escorts was patrolling of Utö, coming to a range of 10 kilometres (6.2 mi) at closest, when the three ships sailed by. Utö fort was at battle stations during the event, and guns on the three German ships were similarly manned.

== Post War Era ==
After Continuation War Åland Islands were again demilitarized and the fortifications built there demolished. Archipelago Sea Coastal Brigade was renamed Turku Coastal Artillery Regiment for the second time on 4.12.1944. Åland Islands was separated from the regiment as part of the demilitarization, but Hanko Coastal Artillery Battalion and Gulf of Bothnia Coastal Guard were attached to it, resulting the regiments area of responsibility to stretch from Porkkala to Tornio on the Swedish border, an area of 1,000 kilometres (620 mi) long including 17 000 islands. Turku Coastal Artillery Regiment consisted of headquarters in Turku, I fortification battalion (I Linnakkeisto) with headquarters in Korpo and consisting of Utö and Jungfruskär manned forts, Bokulla, Alskär, Lökholma, Lypertö, Kuuskajaskari and Reposaari guard forts along with some forts in Åland Islands that had not been demolished yet. II fortification battalion headquarters were in Hanko and consisted of Russarö and Hästö-Busö manned forts and Bågaskär, Ändö, Skälö, Jussarö and Morgonlandet guard forts. Örö and Sommarö were directly subordinated to regiment headquarters as independent forts.

As part of the armistice treaty Finland was required to sweep naval mines from Gulf of Finland with a force of 200 vessels. This requirement caused great problems since Finnish Navy and Coast Guard combined had only half the required number of ships, so civilian ships, mainly tug boats, were requisitioned for the task. Even still it was necessary to use wood-fuelled harbor or lake tugs ill-suited for open sea to reach the required number. The coastal artillery manned four of the seven minesweeper flotillas of the minesweeper fleet, with Turku Coastal Artillery Regiment manning the majority of the V minesweeper flotilla.

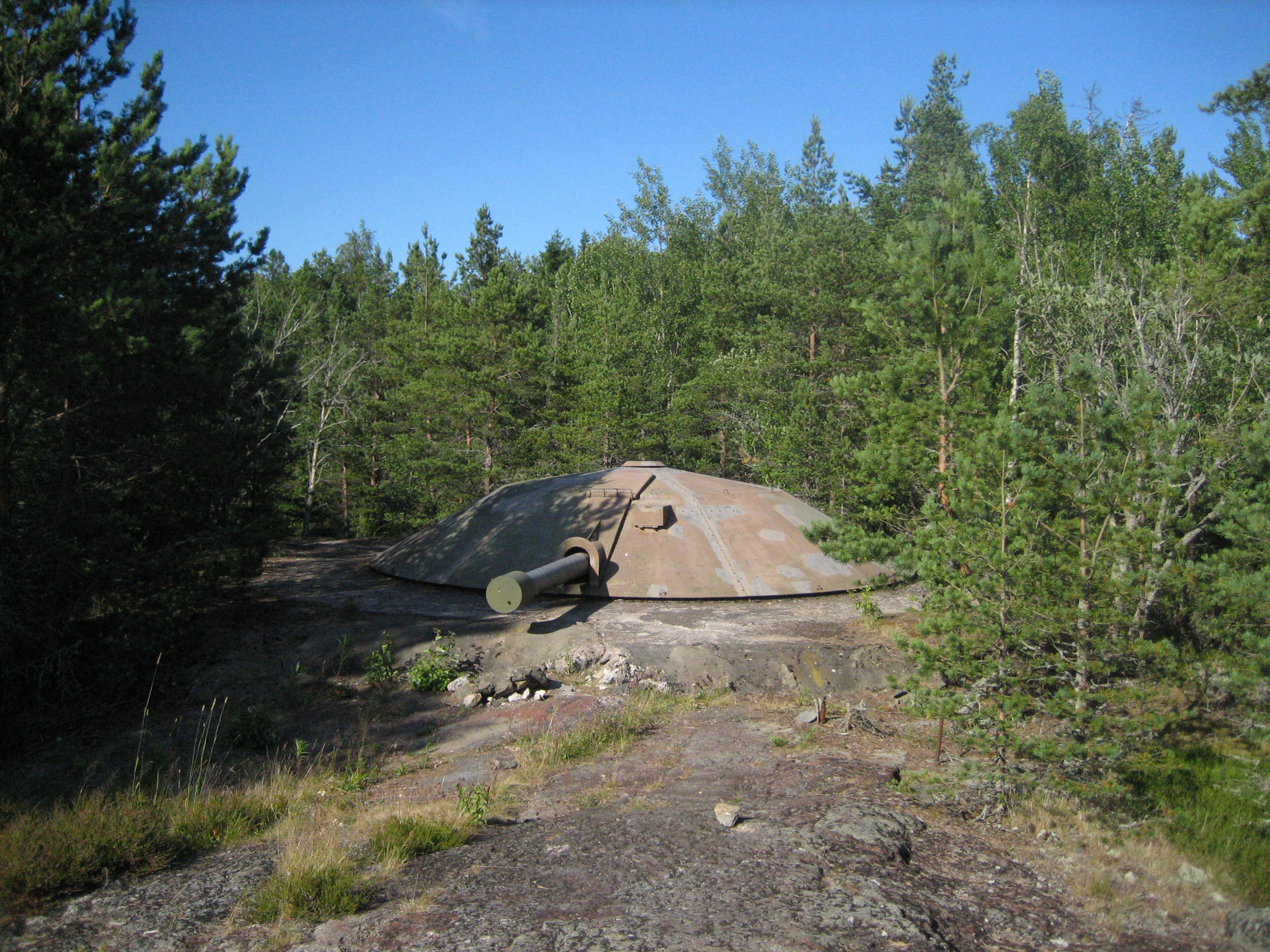
152/50 T coastal gun in Kuuskajaskari

=== 1950s and 1960s ===
Turku Coastal Artillery Regiment was renamed Coastal Artillery Regiment 2 (Rannikkotykistörykmentti 2) 1.12.1952 and II fortification battalion was detached from the regiment as an independent unit. Örö and Sommarö forts were also detached, while a new motorised coastal artillery battery was formed in the regiment in Janhua in Uusikaupunki. Utö and Kuuskajaskari forts were the primary training centers of the regiment while training was also given in Turku and Janhua. The name of regiment was changed, for the third time, to Turku Coastal Artillery Regiment on 1.1.1957. The weaponry of the regiment remained largely the same as before, with dispersed heavy static coastal guns forming the core of the coastal defence. The most significant improvement was modernization of 152/45 C guns to 152/50 T model. By 1970 Utö, Örö (re-attached to regiment in 1969) and Gyltö forts had been equipped with 152/50 T guns. Old heavy anti-aircraft guns, primarily 76 Itk/31 were used as light coastal guns and the Örö 2/305/52 O battery was still kept in use. Anti-aircraft and close defence weapons were mainly from Second World War era or older. Tactical improvements were made for fire control methods however, and radars began to be used. To supply the different island forts the regiment had a supply ship Pansio along with smaller vessels.

=== 1970s to 1990s ===
New coastal guns were developed with 100 TK turret gun replacing older light coastal guns and 130 TK medium turret gun complementing the older 152/50 T. Anti-ship missile battery was formed in the regiment in 1995 and anti-aircraft weaponry was also improved. A major change for signalling equipment was the adoption of digital messaging system. Training organization was changed when Gyltö became a conscript training center in 1967 and Utö and Örö were delegated to NCO and specialist training. The name of the regiment was changed to Turku Coastal Regiment (Turun Rannikkorykmentti) in 1990, and this name was used until the regiment was disbanded in 1998. Conscript training in Kuuskajaskari fort ended in 1997. Regiment received new ships to replace the old ones with the addition of supply ship Parainen in 1980 and minelayer Pyhäranta in 1992.

== Traditions ==
The formation anniversary of the Turku Coastal Regiment is the formation date of Turku Sector, 10.9.1939. The regiment, then named Turku Coastal Artillery Regiment, received its first flag on the Finnish defence forces flag day on 4.6.1958. The march of the regiment was Suomalainen veljeslaulu by Carl Collan. Turku Coastal Artillery Regiment was named the heritage unit of Lake Ladoga Coastal Artillery Regiment 3 in 1949.

== Names of the Turku Coastal Regiment ==
Names of the Turku Coastal Regiment
Name	Abbr.	Name in English	From	To
Turun Lohko	TLo	Turku Sector	10.9.1939	31.8.1940
Rannikkotykistörykmentti 5	RT 5	Coastal Artillery Regiment 5	1.9.1940	16.3.1941
Turun Rannikkotykistörykmentti	TRT	Turku Coastal Artillery Regiment	17.3.1941	15.6.1941
5. Rannikkoprikaati	5.RPr	5th Coastal Brigade	16.6.1941	6.11.1941
7. Rannikkoprikaati	7.RPr	7th Coastal Brigade	7.11.1941	28.2.1942
Saaristomeren Rannikkoprikaati	SaarRPr	Archipelago Sea Coastal Brigade	1.3.1942	3.12.1944
Turun Rannikkotykistörykmentti	TRT	Turku Coastal Artillery Regiment	4.12.1944	30.11.1952
Rannikkotykistörykmentti 2	RT 2	Coastal Artillery Regiment 2	1.12.1952	31.12.1956
Turun Rannikkotykistörykmentti	TurRtR	Turku Coastal Artillery Regiment	1.1.1957	31.12.1989
Turun Rannikkorykmentti	TurRR	Turku Coastal Regiment	1.1.1990	30.6.1998

== Commanders of the Turku Coastal Regiment ==
- Lieutenant Colonel Lennart Hannelius, 10.9.1939-16.12.1939
- Lieutenant Colonel Niilo Heiro, 17.12.1939-14.6.1940
- Colonel Taavi Kainulainen, 15.6.1940-9.3.1942
- Colonel Niilo Heiro, 10.3.1942-3.12.1944
- Major General Eino Järvinen, 4.12.1944-30.4.1945
- Colonel Taavi Kainulainen, 1.5.1945-11.4.1955
- Colonel Martti Miettinen, 12.4.1955-17.2.1956
- Colonel Väinö Karvinen, 18.2.1956-9.7.1960
- Colonel Veikko Hassinen, 10.7.1960-29.9.1966
- Colonel Aarre Kurki, 30.9.1966-22.10.1968
- Colonel Yrjö Pohjanvirta, 23.10.1968-21.5.1977
- Colonel Pentti Aulaskari, 22.5.1977-1.10.1979
- Colonel Jukka Karvinen, 2.10.1979-30.9.1985
- Colonel Olavi Simola, 1.10.1985-31.1.1990
- Lieutenant Colonel Ilmari Heinonen, 1.2.1990-31.5.1990
- Colonel Risto Sinkkonen, 1.6.1990-29.2.1992
- Colonel Juhani Haapala, 1.3.1992-28.3.1996
- Colonel Pertti Malmberg, 29.3.1996-30.6.1998

== Citations and references ==
=== Cited sources ===
- Veriö, Toivo; Simola, Olavi (1995). Turun Rannikkorykmentti 1939-1994. Rannikkotykistön joukko-osastojen historiasarja (in Finnish). Rannikkotykistön Upseeriyhdistys r.y. ISBN 952-90-5238-3.
