= Archipelago Sea Naval Command =

- Active: 1998–2014
- Country: Finland
- Branch: Finnish Navy
- Role: Coastal defence
- Size: 320 conscripts, 640 career personnel
- Part of: Finnish Navy
- Headquarters: Pansio, Turku
- Nickname(s): Ässämmepa
- March: Ernst von Vegesach March
- Equipment: MTO 85, Rauma class, Hämeenmaa class

Archipelago Sea Naval Command (Finnish: Saaristomeren meripuolustusalue, Swedish: Skärgårdshavets Marinkommando) was a Finnish Navy unit headquartered in Pansio, Turku. Its main operating area was the Archipelago Sea. Archipelago Sea Naval Command was formed in 1998 by combining the Archipelago Sea Fleet and Turku Coastal Regiment. The command was wound down at the end of 2014 and its constituent units were moved to a new command, the Coastal Fleet, which contains all vessels of the Navy.

The main duty of the Archipelago Sea Naval Command during normal condition was the surveillance of Finnish territorial waters and maintaining territorial integrity. In addition, the Command trained conscripts to fulfil duties in the crisis-time organization of the Command. The Command was always at the state of enhanced readiness, prepared to repel unauthorized incursions to Finnish waters using force. In a crisis, securing the sea lanes for the use of Finnish commercial shipping would have been the main duty of the Command.

Turku Coast Battalion consists of Military Police Company and Logistics Company. The Coast Battalion trains navy and military police NCOs. ASNAC does not give basic training for conscripts anymore, as all Finnish Navy conscripts are initially trained at Gulf of Finland Naval Command's Navy Training Centre at Upinniemi before being transferred to other units for advanced training.

== Organization ==
- 6th Missile Squadron (6. Ohjuslaivue), operating Rauma class Fast Attack Crafts and Hämeenmaa minelayer Uusimaa, Pansio class minelayer Pansio
- 4th Mine Warfare Squadron (4. Miinalaivue), Katanpää class Mine Hunters.
- Turku Coast Battalion (Turun Rannikkopataljoona), responsible for providing logistics, force protection and coastal artillery support for the command. The unit is also responsible for the surveillance of territorial waters.
- Logistics Centre (Huoltokeskus)
- Navy Band (Laivaston Soittokunta)
