= Wiljo Tuompo =

Finnish lieutenant general during World War II

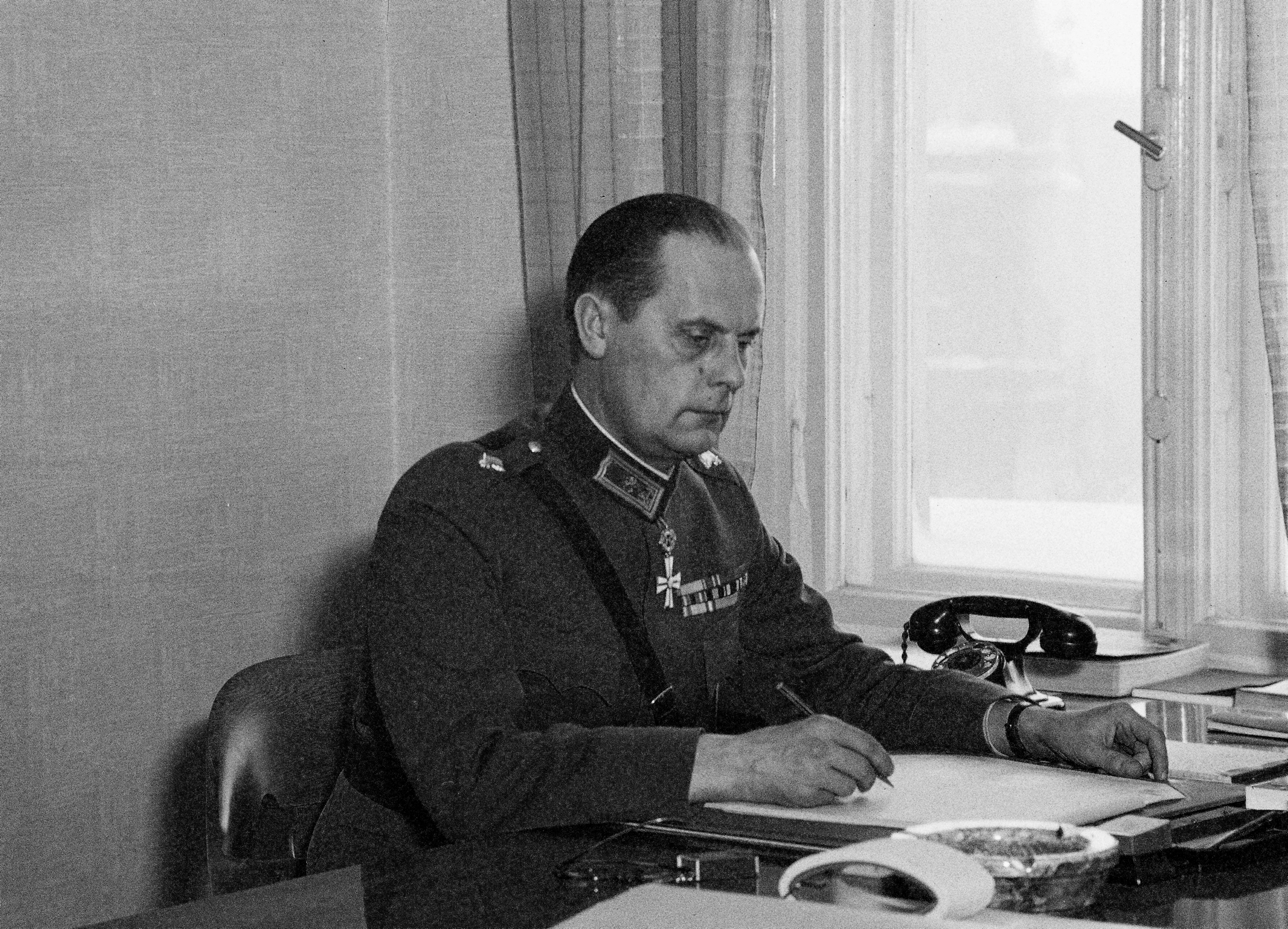
- Wiljo Einar Tuompo
- Born: Wiljo Tuompo; 23 September 1893; Pornainen, Grand Duchy of Finland
- Died: 27 February 1957 (aged 63); Helsinki, Finland

Viljo (Wiljo) Einar Tuompo (23 September 1893 – 27 February 1957) was a Finnish lieutenant general during World War II. He commanded the Finnish Border Guard from 1935 to 1939, and from 1940 to 1941. During the Winter War, he was commander of the North Finland Group. During the Continuation War, Tuompo was the Chief of the Command Staff at General Headquarters in Mikkeli. He retired in 1945. Tuompo then traveled to Sweden to be with his family.

He returned to Finland in 1948, when Punainen Valpo arrested him as soon as he arrived in Finland. Valpo interrogated him for five days. After that, he was released when no reason for his arrest could be found.
