= North Karelian Group =

Winter war formation of Finnish Army

The North Karelian Group (Pohjois-Karjalan Ryhmä, P-KR) was a formation of the Finnish Army during the Winter War, part of the North Finland Group, the latter being responsible for the c. 800-kilometre (500 mi) border from Lieksa to the Arctic Ocean. The North Karelian Group defended the wide stretch of border between the Finnish IV Corps and the troops around Suomussalmi. It fought around Lieksa and Kuhmo where the Soviet 54th Division was defeated with motti tactics.

== Order of battle ==
- Detached Battalion 12
- Detached Battalion 13
- Detached Battalion 14
- Detached Company Kaasila
- 4th Detached Battery (4.Er. Ptri)
- Field Replacement Battalion of the North Karelian Group (I TP/P-KR)
