= Pasi Välimäki =

Finnish Army officer

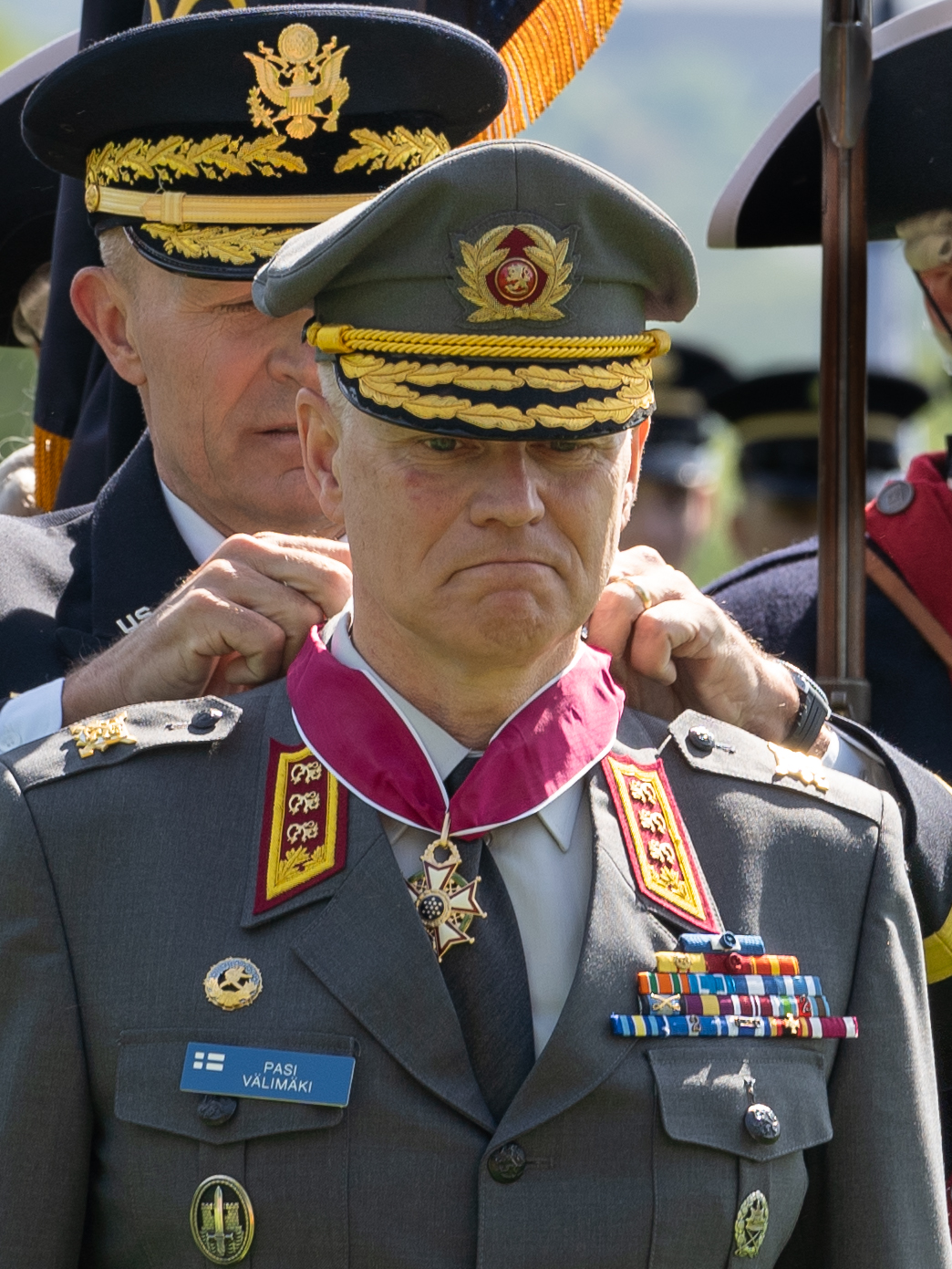
- Välimäki awarded the Legion of Merit, 2025
- Born: 1 September 1965 (age 61); Turku, Finland
- Education: National Defence University; Aalto University (EMBA); National War College (MS)
- Military career
- Allegiance: Finland
- Branch: Finnish Army
- Service years: 1985—Present
- Rank: Lieutenant General
- Commands: Karelia Brigade (2017—2019); Finnish Army (2022—)

Lt Gen Pasi Välimäki (born 1 September 1965) is a Finnish military officer, serving from 1 January 2022 as the commander of the Finnish Army.

== Training and education ==
Välimäki completed his military service in 1986 at the Armoured Brigade with reserve officer training, followed by staff officer studies at the National Defence University, from where he graduated in 1989.

He holds an Executive Master of Business Administration from Aalto University (2010), and Master of Science in National Security Strategy from the National War College in Washington, DC (2016).

== Career ==
He has held various posts in the intelligence and signal corps, both in unit commander and training roles. Outside Finland, he has worked as UN military observer in the former Yugoslavia (UNPROFOR, UNMOP), chief of Intelligence of the Finnish Battalion Kosovo (KFOR), liaison officer at the US Joint Forces Command in Norfolk, Virginia, and deputy chief of Operations, Regional Command North HQ, ISAF in Afghanistan.

In 2017, Välimäki was appointed as the commander of Karelia Brigade, where he served until 2019. From there he moved to the post of deputy chief of staff, Operations, of the Finnish Defence Forces, until his appointment as the commander of the Finnish Army from January 2022.
