= North Finland Group =

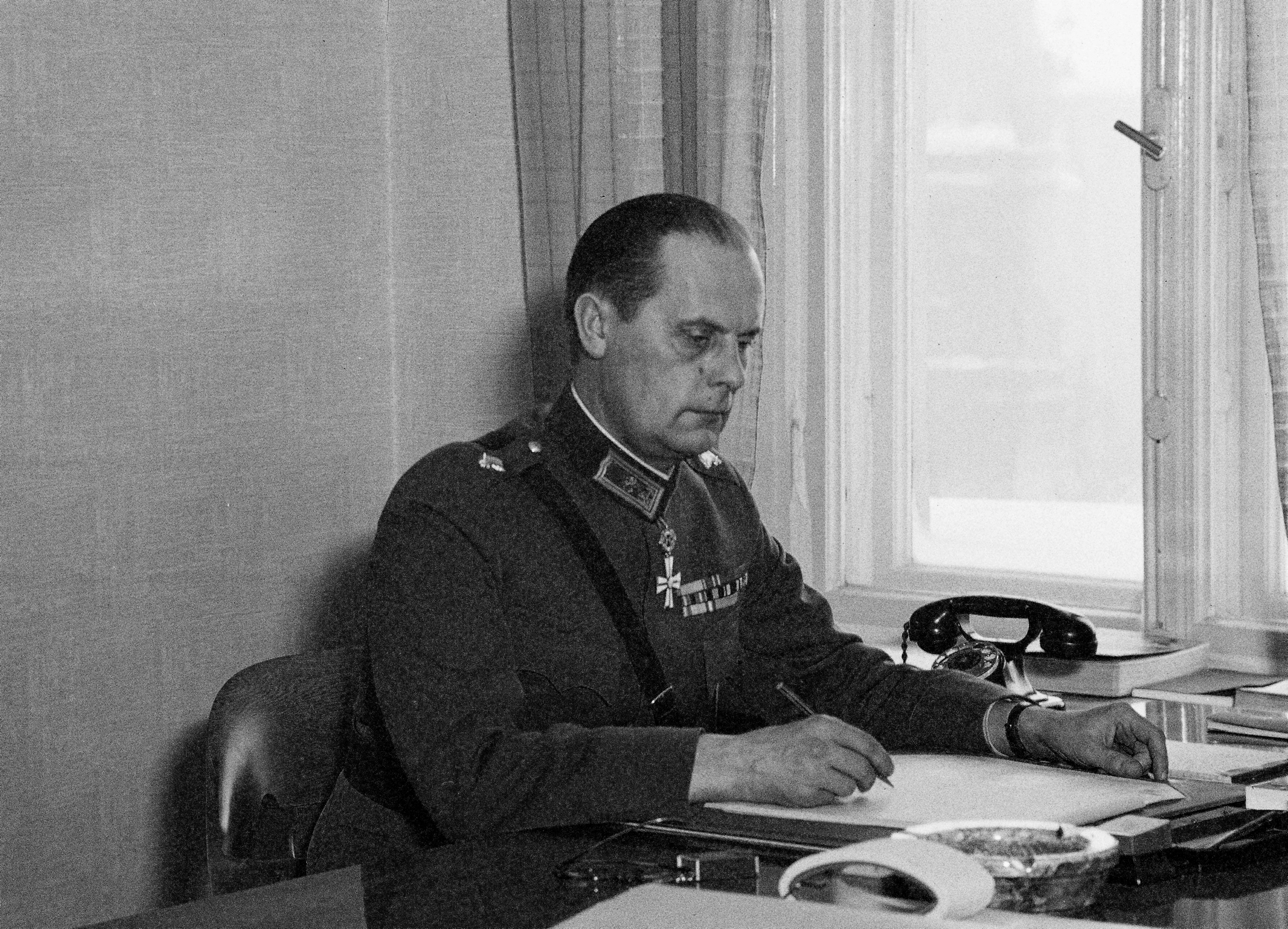
Commander of the North Finland Group Major General Wiljo Tuompo.

The North Finland Group (Finnish: Pohjois-Suomen Ryhmä) was a formation of the Finnish Army during the Winter War. It was responsible for an almost 800-kilometer-long border from the town of Lieksa to the Arctic Ocean. The group was under the command of Major General Wiljo Tuompo, and its headquarters was located in Kajaani.

The formation was charged with defending Northern Finland. It had two subgroups, the Lapland Group in the north and the North Karelian Group in the south. During the Battle of Suomussalmi on 11 December 1939, the main headquarters took under control the Lapland Group, and appointed Kurt Martti Wallenius as its commander. The North Finland Group remained in areas of the North Karelian Group, Suomussalmi and Kuhmo.
