= Finnish Army =

Branch of the Finnish Defence Forces

- Maavoimat (Finnish); Armén (Swedish)
- Emblem of the Finnish Army since 2008
- Founded: 1555 (first Finnish unit in Swedish service); 1881 (as the Grand Ducal army); 1918 (upon independence); 2008 (as a branch of the Finnish Defence Forces)
- Country: Finland
- Type: Army
- Role: Land warfare
- Size: 3,610 staff; 770 civilians; 18,400 conscripts; 18,400 reservists in refresher training; 760 deployed in crisis management; 180,000 wartime strength
- Part of: Finnish Defence Forces
- March: March of the Finnish cavalry in the Thirty Years' War
- Anniversaries: 24 February
- Engagements: Finnish Civil War; Heimosodat; Winter War; Continuation War; Lapland War; UNIFIL; KFOR; War in Afghanistan; War in Iraq; EUTM Mali
- Website: maavoimat.fi/en

Commanders
- Commander: Pasi Välimäki

Insignia
- Flag

- Roundel

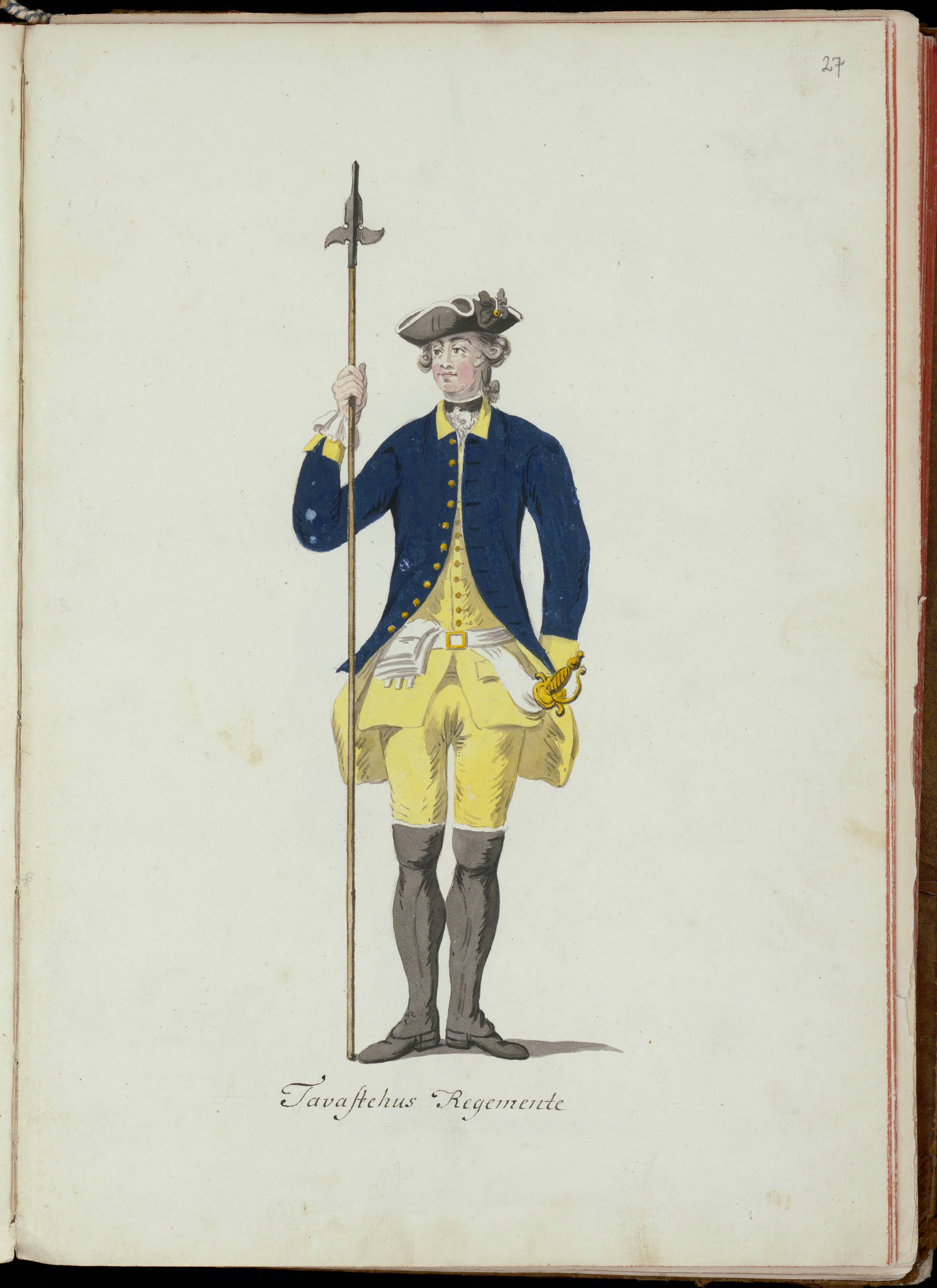
Uniform of the Häme Regiment during Swedish rule (mid-18th century)

The Finnish Army (Finnish: Maavoimat [ˈmɑːˌʋoi̯mɑt], Swedish: Armén) is the land forces branch of the Finnish Defence Forces. The Finnish Army is divided into six branches: infantry (which includes armoured units), field artillery, ground-based air defence, engineers, signals, and logistics troops. The commander of the Finnish Army as of 1 January 2022 is Lieutenant General Pasi Välimäki.

== Role ==
The duties of the Finnish Army are threefold. They are:

1. Defence of the land area of the realm
2. Support of civilian authorities
3. International military crisis management operations

In addition to these tasks, the army is responsible for conscription and personnel management of the reserve.

The current army is, as it has been since the end of Second World War, in peacetime training formation. This means that its brigades (Finnish: joukko-osasto) are not meant to be operational combat units but training formations. According to the "troop production" doctrine (Finnish: joukkotuotanto), peacetime units will train each batch of conscripts they receive for a specific wartime unit. After the end of training, the conscripts are demobilised into the reserve. During regular refresher exercises and in case of a crisis, the reserve unit will be activated and deployed in the formation it trained in during conscription. Thus, the peacetime structure of the army does not give any meaningful information about its mobilised structure or about the areas where units would be used.

== History ==
On 24 February 1555, Swedish King Gustav Vasa ordered the establishment of a Swedish Army unit consisting of Finns. Finland at that time was part of the Swedish Kingdom. This was the first such unit in the Swedish Army, and 24 February is now celebrated as the Finnish Army's anniversary.

Between 1809 and 1917, Finland was an autonomous state ruled by the Russian Empire as the Grand Duchy of Finland. Between 1881 and 1901, the Grand Duchy had its own army.

The Grand Duchy inherited its allotment system (Swedish: indelningsverket; Finnish: ruotujakolaitos) from the Swedish military organization. However, for several decades, Russian rulers did not require military service from Finland; operations and defence were mostly taken care by Russian troops based in the Grand Duchy. As a result, officer benefits of the allotment system became practically pensions, as payment was based on passive availability, not on actual service.

During the Napoleonic Wars three 1,200-man regiments were formed in Finland and Topographic Corps in Hamina. In 1821, the Topographic Corps was transformed into the cadet officers school. In 1829, one of the training battalions was transformed into the Young Guard Battalion, the Finnish Guards.

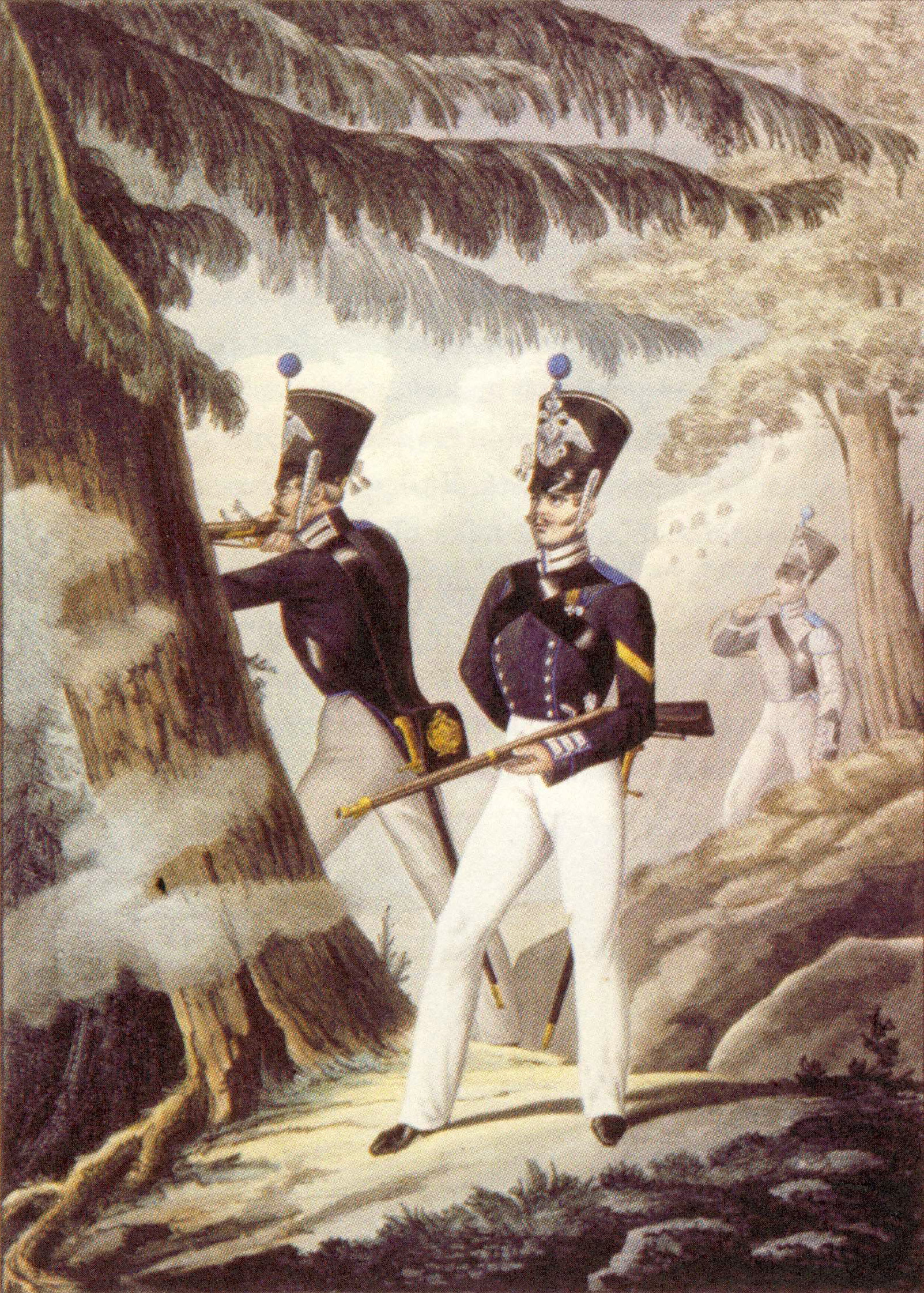
Finnish Guards in 1830.

During the Crimean War in 1854, Finland set up nine sharpshooter battalions based on a rota system. Conscription was introduced in Finland in 1878. The Finnish Guard took part in fighting to suppress the 1830 November Uprising in Poland and participated in the Russo-Turkish War (1877–1878), after which it gained the status of Old Guard of the Russian Emperor.

The Finnish Army was gradually broken up during the "oppression years" just after the turn of the century. As Finnish conscripts refused to serve in the Imperial Russian Army, conscription ended in Finland and it was replaced with a tax paid from the Finnish Senate to the Imperial treasury.

At the end of the 19th century, the Russian Empire was weakening, and this was reflected in a reduced capacity of the Russian troops to keep public order. Voluntary defence organizations disguised as fire brigades were formed by the Finnish people, especially during the strikes during and after the Russo-Japanese War.

There were socialist Red Guards and conservative, anti-socialist Civil Guards (or White Guards). Also, during the First World War activists secretly travelled to Germany to receive military training and to be trained as Jäger troops (Finnish: jääkärit, Swedish: jägare).

After independence and the beginning of the Finnish Civil War the White government declared the White Guards as government troops, and the war was fought between the Red Guards, assisted by communist Russians, and White Guards added with the Jägers and assisted by the German Empire.

After the war in 1919, the Civil Guards became a separate organization. Therefore, strictly speaking, there is no continuity between the White Guards, which became a voluntary organization, and the Finnish Army, which was a cadre army based on conscription. However, Jägers gained important positions in the army, and German tactics and military principles were adopted.

The ground forces were organized according to a regional system after the report undertaken by Lieutenant Colonel Aksel Airo in 1930. The wartime field army mobilization and regional administration tasks were now taken over by the Civil Guard, forming the local structure according to which the wartime field army would be established. From 1934, the peacetime ground forces would be organized under the command of an Army Corps headquartered in Viipuri under which there was three divisions [1.D - 3.D] and one cavalry brigade. These forces would form the cadre body of wartime protective forces.

=== Peacetime structure before the Winter War ===
- Army Corps Headquarters (Finnish: Armeijakunnan Esikunta, AKE)
  - 1. Division, Helsinki
    - Finnish White Guard Regiment, Helsinki
    - Pori Regiment, Turku
    - Uusimaa Regiment, Helsinki
    - Field Artillery Regiment 1, Hämeenlinna
    - Field Artillery Regiment 4, Helsinki
    - Separate Armoured Company, Hämeenlinna
    - Helsinki Assignment Company, Helsinki
    - Helsinki Car Company, Helsinki
    - Helsinki Commandant's Office, Helsinki
    - Canine Kennel, Hämeenlinna
  - 2. Division, Viipuri
    - Karelian Guards Regiment, Viipuri
    - Tampere Regiment, Lahti
    - Central Finland Regiment, Kouvola
    - Bicycle Battalion 1, Terijoki
    - Bicycle Battalion 2, Valkjärvi
    - Field Artillery Regiment 2, Viipuri
    - Anti-Air Regiment, Viipuri
    - Signals Battalion, Viipuri
    - Separate Pioneer Company, Kellomäki
    - Supplies Battalion, Viipuri
    - Viipuri Commandant's Office, Viipuri
  - 3. Division, Mikkeli
    - Savo Jaeger Regiment, Käkisalmi
    - Viipuri Regiment, Jaakkima
    - Pohja Regiment, Kuopio
    - Bicycle Battalion 3, Mikkeli
    - Vuoksi Jaeger Battalion, Sakkola
    - Pioneer Battalion, Koria
    - Field Artillery Regiment 3, Riihimäki
  - Cavalry Brigade, Lappeenranta
    - Uusimaa Dragoon Regiment, Lappeenranta
    - Häme Cavalry Regiment, Lappeenranta
    - Cavalry NCO School, Lappeenranta
    - Signals Squadron, Lappeenranta
    - Mounted Battery, Mikkeli
    - Cavalry School, Ypäjä

=== Winter War ===
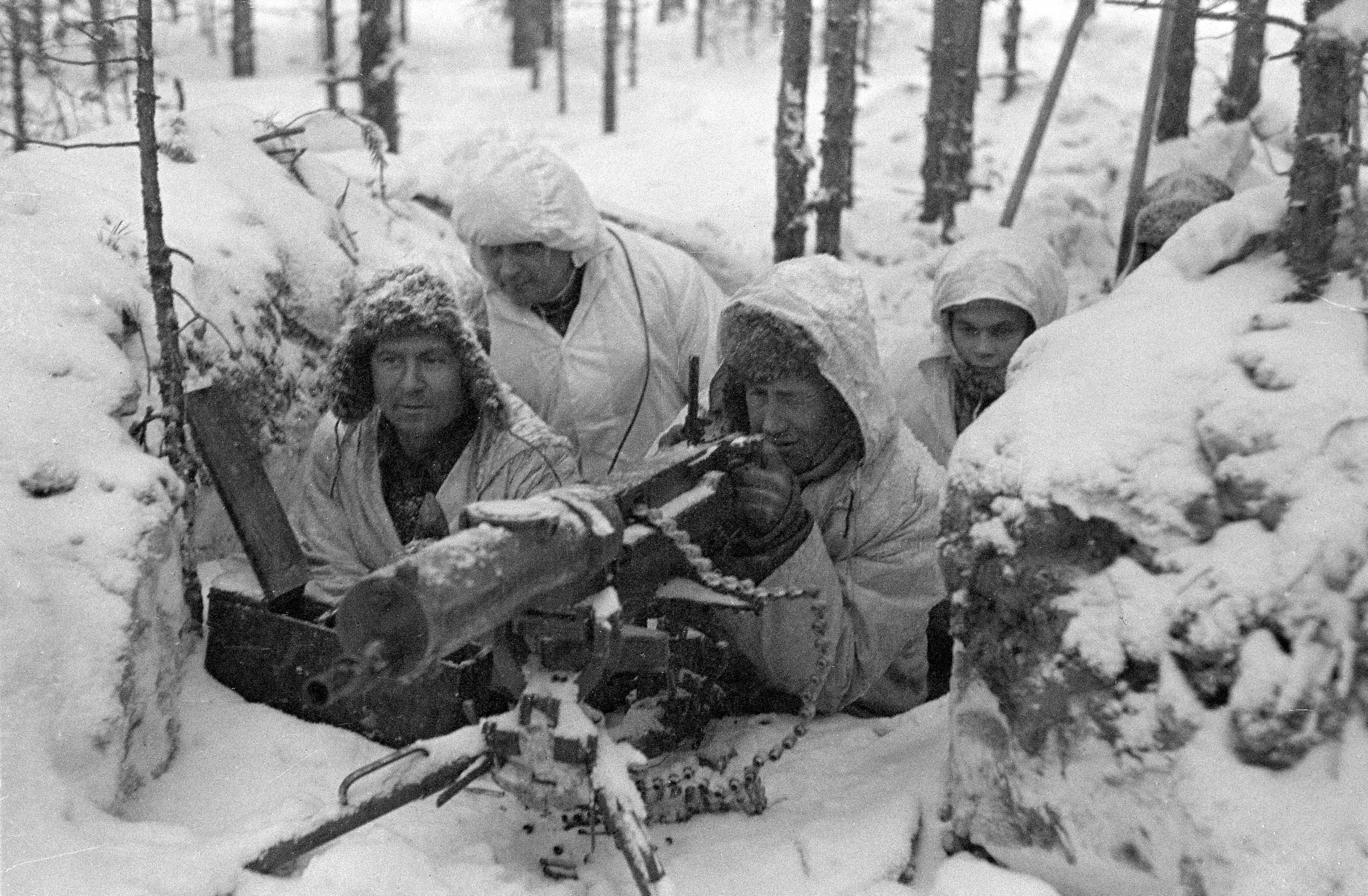
Finnish troops at a machine gun post during the Winter War.

The Finnish Army consisted of 9 field divisions, 4 brigades and a number of small independent battalions and companies at the beginning of the Winter War, which began on 30 November 1939 when the Soviet Union invaded Finland. During the war, the army was organised into three corps. The II and III Corps were organised into the Army of the Isthmus which was located on the Karelian Isthmus, the likely location for the main Soviet attack. The IV Corps defended the area north of Lake Ladoga. The defence of the rest of the border up to Petsamo by the Arctic Ocean was given to the North Finland Group which consisted of a handful of independent battalions.

In order to organize replacements for the units, a Field Replacement Brigade (Finnish: Kenttätäydennysprikaati, KT-Pr) of nine battalions was formed. But due to the severity of the Soviet attack the battalions had to be used as combat troops. In addition, three Replacement Divisions or Home Replacement Divisions (1.Koti.TD – 3.Koti.TD) were formed from the available reservists. As the situation became more alarming, the 1st and 3rd Replacement Divisions were reformed into the 21st and 23rd Divisions and sent to the front on 19 December. The 2nd Replacement Division was deployed as individual regiments to Northern Finland.

The Winter War ended on 13 March 1940. Finland ceded 9% of its territory via the Moscow Peace Treaty, but successfully resisted Soviet conquest.

=== Army of the Isthmus ===
- Army of the Isthmus (Finnish: Kannaksen Armeija, KannA) (Commander: Lieutenant General Hugo Österman) located on the Karelian Isthmus.
  - II Corps (II AK) (Commander: Lieutenant General Harald Öhquist)
    - 4th Division
    - 5th Division
    - 11th Division
  - III Corps (III AK) (Commander: Major General Erik Heinrichs)
    - 8th Division
    - 10th Division
  - Reserve
    - 1st Division

Four delaying groups, named for their location, were stationed immediately by the border on the isthmus.

==== Independent formations ====
- IV Corps (IV AK) (Commander: Major General Juho Heiskanen and then Major General Woldemar Hägglund from 4 December 1939) located in the Ladoga Karelia.
  - 12th Division
  - 13th Division
- North Finland Group (Finnish: Pohjois-Suomen Ryhmä) (Commander: Major General Wiljo Tuompo)
  - Lapland Group (Finnish: Lapin Ryhmä) in Salla and Petsamo
  - North Karelian Group (Finnish: Pohjois-Karjalan Ryhmä) in North Karelia

==== Reserves of C-in-C ====
- 6th Division (Southern Finland)
- 9th Division (Northern Finland)
- Field Replacement Brigade (KT-Pr)

=== Interim Peace ===
The Finnish Army Headquarters was formed by the order of the General Headquarters on the 19th March 1940 by renaming the Army of the Isthmus. The new echelon overseeing the ground forces was short lived, since it was disbanded by August 1940. The peacetime forces now consisted of five Army Corps under which there were among others, fifteen infantry brigades. The brigades could be reinforced with reservists, forming the cadre body of an wartime division. Overall, the amount of wartime divisions was increased to sixteen.

=== Continuation War ===
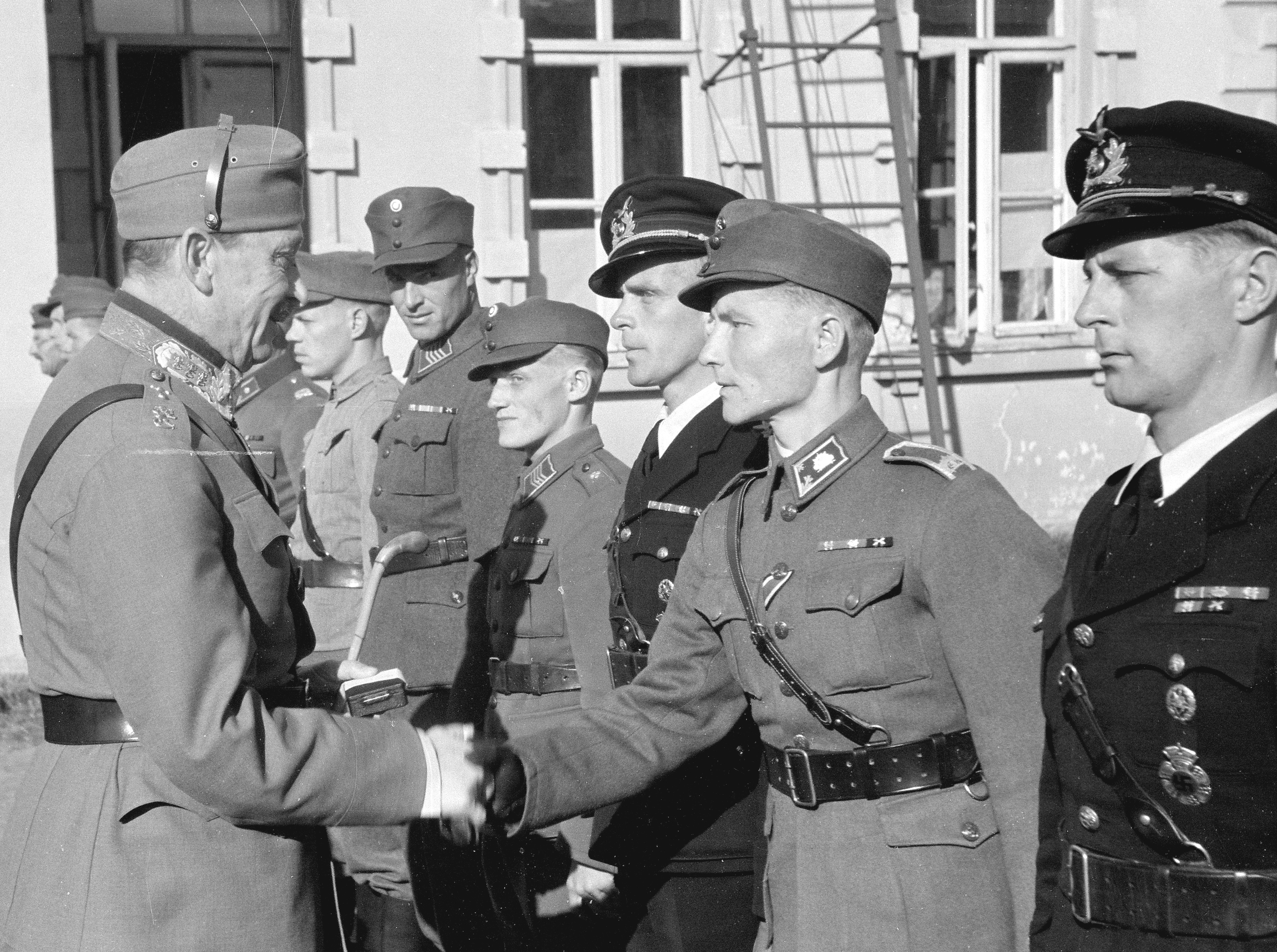
Mannerheim awarding Mannerheim Crosses to soldiers and aviators. He is congratulating cadet Yrjö Keinonen, who later became Finnish Chief of Defence. The man next to him (to the right) is flying ace Jorma Karhunen.

Finnish military vehicles roundel during WWII.

The Army of Karelia was formed on 29 June 1941 soon after the start of the Continuation War. There were seven Finnish corps in the field during the war: the I, II, III, IV, V, VI and VII. During the war, the Finnish Army was responsible for the front from the Gulf of Finland to Kainuu. The front in Northern Finland was the responsibility of the German AOK Norwegen. During summer and autumn 1941, the Finnish Army re-conquered the areas lost to the Soviet Union in the Winter War and pushed deep into Soviet territory in East Karelia. In winter 1942, the Finnish political leadership ended offensive action and the front stagnated for over two years.

The relatively inactive period of stationary war ended abruptly in June 1944, as the Soviet Union started its Fourth Strategic Offensive. As a result, the Finnish Army lost large areas of the Karelian Isthmus, most importantly Viipuri, a major city, and was forced to retreat from East Karelia. However, in the decisive Battle of Tali-Ihantala, the Soviet advance was halted. The Soviet Union concentrated its forces on the battles in Central Europe, and Finland made a separate peace in September 1944.

=== Lapland War ===
The Lapland War (Finnish: Lapin sota) between Finland and Germany was fought from September 1944 to April 1945, in Finland's Lapland Province. While the Finns saw this as a separate conflict much like the Continuation War, German forces considered their actions to be part of the Second World War. A peculiarity of the war was that the Finnish Army was forced to demobilise its forces while simultaneously fighting the German Army, in an effort to force it out of Finland. The German forces retreated to Norway, and Finland was, therefore, able to uphold its armistice agreement with the Soviet Union.

=== Cold War ===
During the Cold War, Finland was neutral but maintained close ties to the Soviet Union. The Finnish Army was in a difficult situation as it bordered the Soviet Union. Porkkala was leased to the Soviet Union for 50 years, per the terms of the Moscow Armistice. The Soviets completed construction of a naval base at Porkkala in 1945. Porkkala was handed back to Finland in 1956, for Kaliningrad had become a better place for the Soviet Navy.

The peacetime structure of the Finnish ground forces remained mostly the same; consisting of three independent divisions as well as the Armoured Brigade, however without an Army Corps echelon. As such there was no Army Headquarters unlike the Navy and Air Force. From 1 July 1966, the Finnish ground forces were reorganized into seven independent military provinces (Sotilaslääni) which oversaw the regional system consisting of military districts (Sotilaspiiri) and the standing cadre brigades, regiments and battalions of the ground forces. The military provinces were as follows: Southern Finland, Northern Finland, Southeastern Finland, Southwestern Finland, Savo-Karelian, Inner Finland and Ostrobothnian Military Provinces. This structure were to remain the same all the way to the end of the Cold War.

=== Post Cold War ===
As part of rationalization of the military funding, the Finnish Defence Forces oversaw organizational reforms in the end of the 1980s. As part of long-term planning new organization was approved from the beginning of 1993. As part of this reform a position of Ground Forces Chief was added to the Defence Command along with an Army Office (Pääesikunnan maavoimatoimisto), which was responsible for ground forces' development and training. The regional defence responsibility was given to new three National Defence Areas (Maanpuolustusalue) which were the Northern, Western and Eastern National Defence Areas. The amount of Military Provinces (Sotilaslääni) were increased to twelve and all Military Districts (Sotilaspiiri) were disbanded with their tasks given to the Military Provinces. As part of the development of wartime forces, each National Defence Area reorganized one of their brigades as a readiness brigade (M05), which were equipped according to their area of responsibility. The brigades were Kainuu Brigade in the Northern Area, Pori Brigade in the Western Area and Karelia Brigade in the Eastern Area. In addition Utti Jaeger Regiment was formed in 1997 and subordinated directly to the Defence Command.

=== As an independent branch ===
The structure of the Finnish Defence Forces was again refined in 2008. The Army Office was disbanded and the Finnish Army became an independent branch of the Finnish Defence Forces, with its own commander and headquarters in Mikkeli. The National Defence Areas were disbanded and their tasks were given to the Finnish Army Headquarters, now responsible for both peacetime and wartime tasks related to the ground forces. The Finnish Army was split into seven military provinces, of which four were operational military provinces. The reform related to military provinces was short-lived as the non-operational provinces were disbanded by 2010 and replaced with regional offices.

== Organisation ==
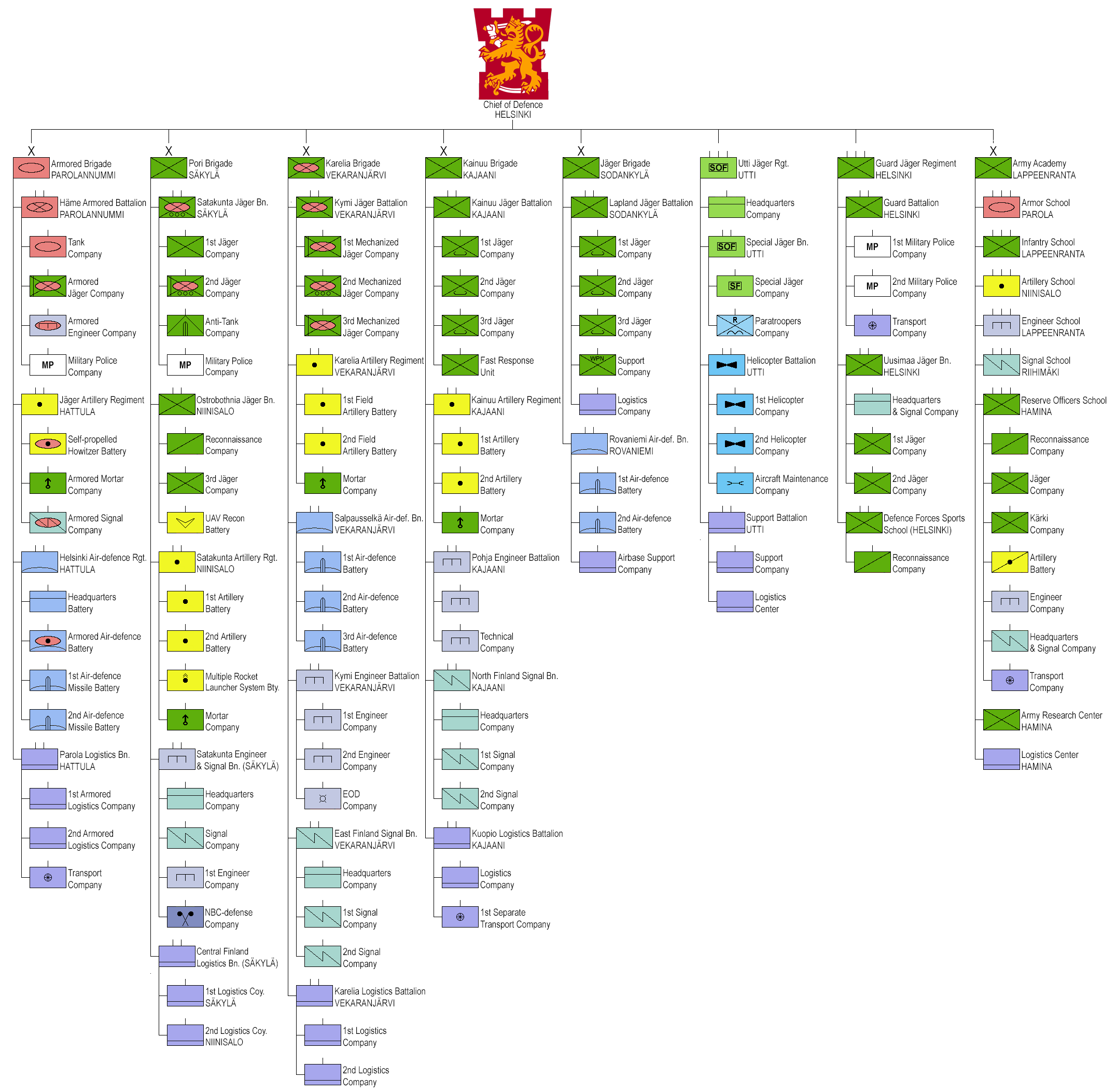
Peacetime organisation of the Finnish Army in 2024 (click to enlarge)

Locations of Finnish Army units

The army is organised into eight Peacetime brigades. Two of these brigades, the Army Academy and the Utti Jaeger Regiment do not have subordinate regional offices. The six other brigades have one or more subordinate regional offices and a deputy commander. During a crisis, the regional offices form provincial local battalions and the brigade headquarters form the regional command level. During normal operation, the regional offices are responsible for conscription, organising voluntary national defence work and planning crisis-time activities.

The brigades are:

- Armoured Brigade, Parola, and Riihimäki
- Army Academy, Lappeenranta, and Hamina
- Guard Jaeger Regiment, Helsinki
- Jaeger Brigade, Sodankylä, and Rovaniemi
- Kainuu Brigade, Kajaani
- Karelia Brigade, Valkeala
- Pori Brigade, Säkylä, and Niinisalo
- Utti Jaeger Regiment, Utti

Army logistics is part of the joint Finnish Defence Forces Logistics Command.

During war time the army is organised operative forces which consists of approximately 61 000 men and territorial forces which consist of 176 000 men.

The following list is the wartime organisation of the Finnish Army from 1.1.2008

Operative forces:

- 3 readiness brigades
- 2 jaeger brigades
- 2 mechanised battlegroups
- 1 helicopter battalion
- 1 special jaeger battalion
- 1 anti-aircraft missile and anti-aircraft unit

Territorial forces:

- 6 infantry brigades
- 14 independent battalions / battlegroups
- 28 Territorial Forces (Finland) (company sized)

== Equipment ==
Major weapon systems used by the army include:

- 239 main battle tanks
- 212 infantry fighting vehicles
- 394 armoured personnel carriers (APCs) (tracked)
- 707 APCs (wheeled)
- 1,679 mortars
- 740 towed artillery pieces
- 82 (40) self-propelled artillery pieces
- 75 multiple launch rocket systems
- 27 helicopters
- 66 unmanned aerial vehicles
- +1068 anti-aircraft artillery
- 346 surface-to-air missiles systems

== Gallery ==
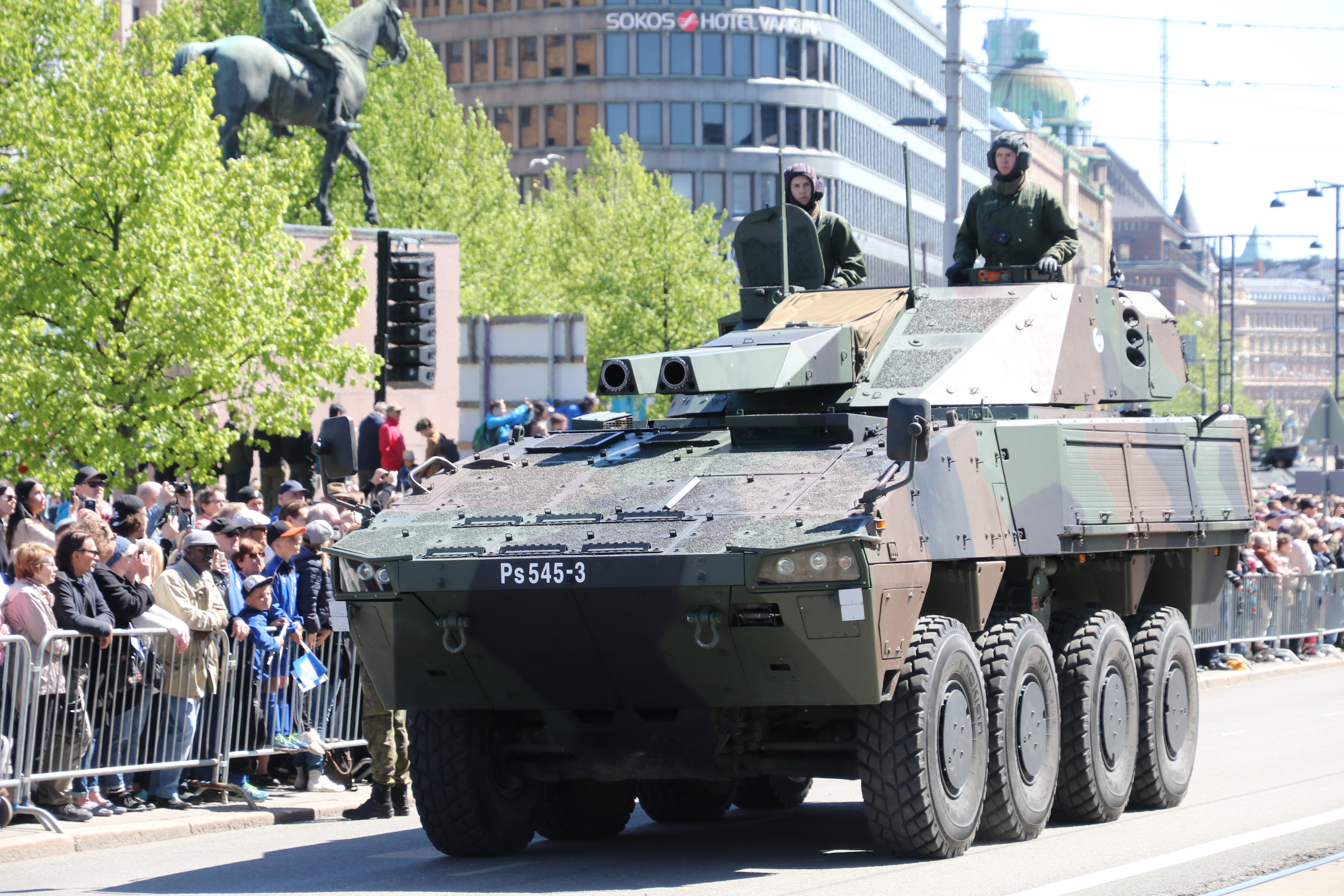
Patria AMV with AMOS mortar system at the national parade on the Flag Day of the Finnish Defence Forces

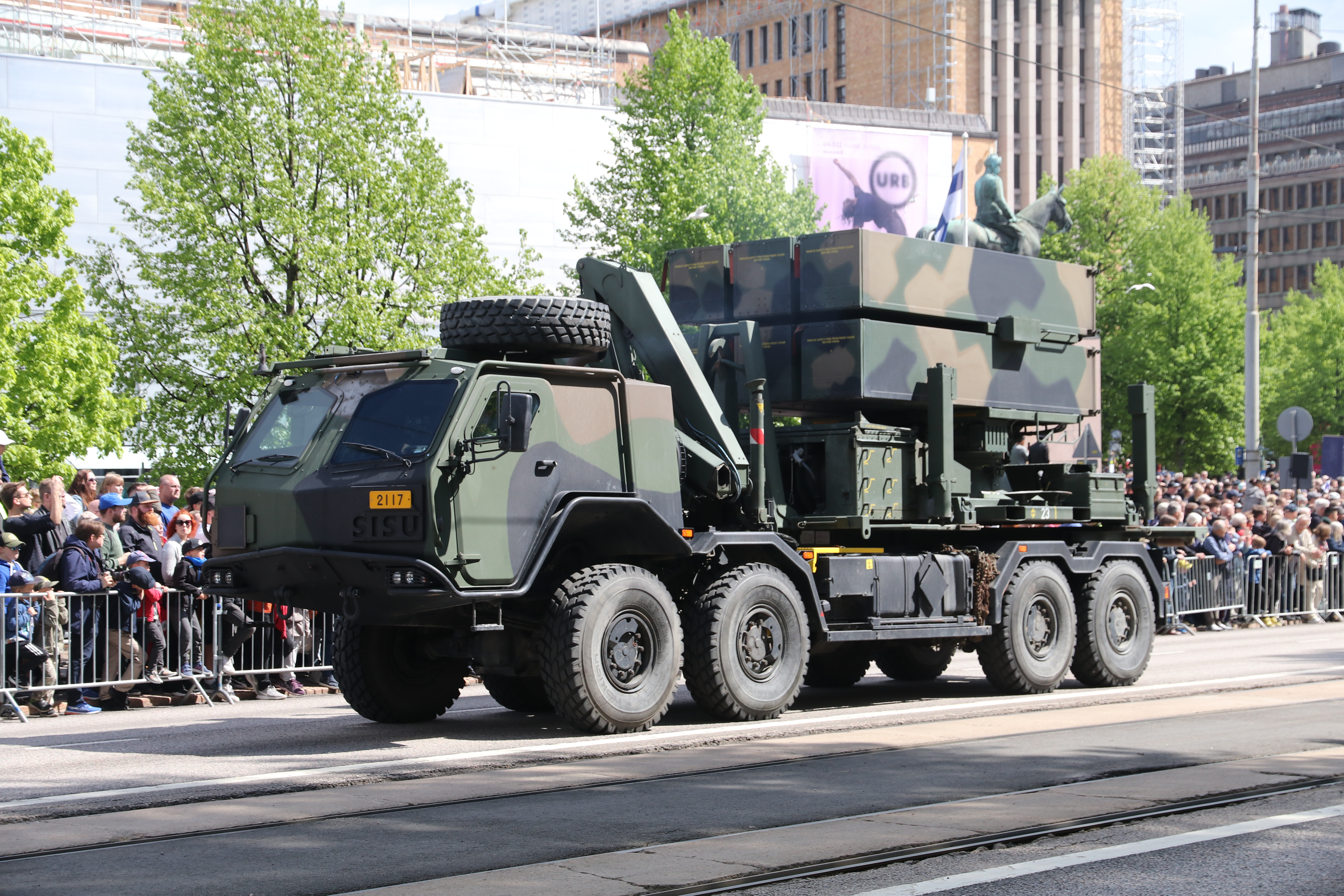
NASAMS (ITO 12) surface-to-air missile launcher carried on Sisu E13TP all-terrain 8×8 truck

== See also ==
- Ski warfare
- List of Finnish corps in the Winter War
- List of Finnish divisions in the Winter War
- M05 military camouflage pattern
