= Karelia Brigade =

Karelian Brigade
- Karjalan Prikaati
- Insignia of the Karelia Brigade
- Country: Finland
- Branch: Finnish Army
- Type: Combined arms
- Role: Readiness brigade
- Size: Wartime size unknown, peacetime size 600 career personnel, 4,000 conscripts annually
- Garrison/HQ: Vekaranjärvi, Finland
- Flag

Commanders
- Brigadier General: Jyri Raitasalo
- Notable commanders: Timo Kivinen (GEN), Jari Kallio (MG), Pasi Välimäki (LTG)

Insignia
- Headdress: Green beret with lion's head pin

Karelia Brigade (Finnish: Karjalan Prikaati; Swedish: Karelska brigaden) is one of the three Finnish Army readiness brigades. It is currently based at Valkeala. With some three thousand soldiers it is the second largest brigade in Finland. It is the only Finnish brigade providing training in all Army branches and houses the Finnish Defence Forces Explosive Ordnance Disposal Centre of Excellence. As of 2023, its commander is brigadier general Jyri Raitasalo.

== History ==
The present Karelia Brigade was founded on 1 January 1957 by renaming the 5th Brigade. The lineage of the brigade hails back to the Winter War 13th Division, which formed the 8th Brigade during the Interim Peace. During the Continuation War, the brigade formed Infantry Regiment 8. Following the Lapland War, the regiment became a garrison unit in Kouvola, where it was renamed the 5th Brigade in 1952.

== Heraldry and traditions ==
The brigade keeps the traditions of the Regiment of the Karelian Guard (Finnish: Karjalan Kaartin Rykmentti), which was formed in 1918 from three other regiments. The brigade anniversary is on 6 May, commemorating the 1618 order by Gustavus Adolphus of Sweden to found the Regiment of Karelia (Finnish: Karjalan Rykmentti).

The flag of the brigade is the old flag of the Regiment of the Karelian Guard, designed by Carolus Lindberg. It consists of the Finnish coat of arms in the middle of an open laurel wreath. Each of the corners are decorated with the dueling arms from the coat of arms of the Province of Karelia with crowns. The flag is carried on a pole with the Cross of Liberty as a finial, and ribbons of the Cross of Liberty 4th Class. The ribbons are embroudered with names of locations where the original regiment saw combat during the Finnish Civil War.

The brigade insignia consists of the dueling arms of the coat of arms of the Province of Karelia on a laurel wreath. As with the flag, the insignia belonged originally to the Regiment of the Karelian Guard, and was assigned to the brigade in 1967.

Since 4 April 1978, the brigade cross has been the Torkkelinristi, designed by Pentti Vainikka. It is a cross of white and red, with a golden brigade insignia in the middle. The colors stem from those used by the officers of the Regiment of the Karelian Guard on their shoulder insignia.

The brigade march is the old march of the 8th Viipuri Sharpshooter Battalion (Finnish: 8. Viipurin Tark'ampujapataljoona). It was composed by Eduard Dupuy and arranged by Uuno Kuparinen.

== Composition (Peace time) ==
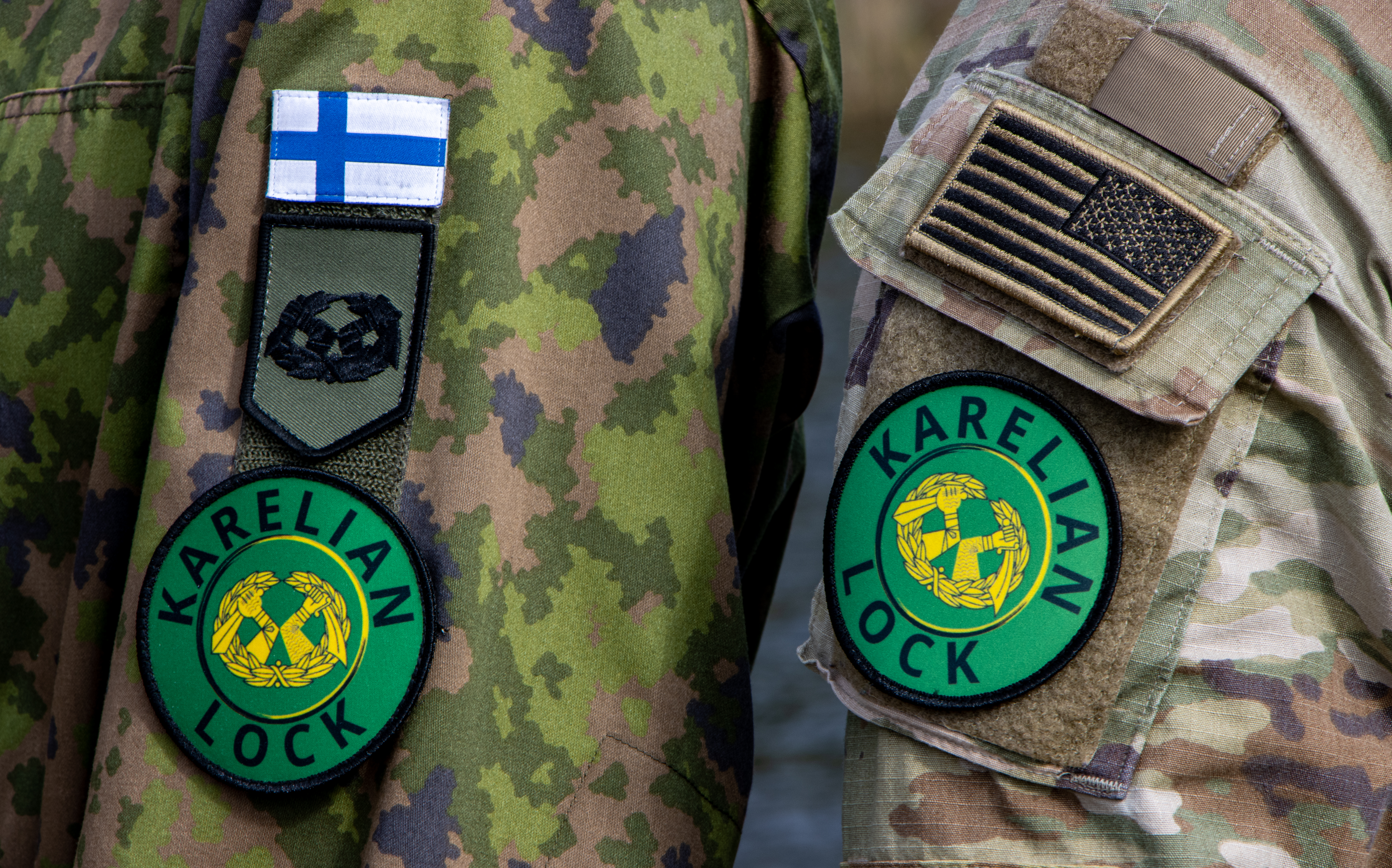
Army regional combat exercise "Karelian Lock 23"

- Kymi Jaeger Battalion (Kymen Jääkäripataljoona, KYMJP)
  - 1st Mechanized Jaeger Company (1. Panssarijääkärikomppania)
  - 2nd Mechanized Jaeger Company (2. Panssarijääkärikomppania)
  - 3rd Mechanized Jaeger Company (3. Panssarijääkärikomppania)
- Karelia Artillery Regiment (Karjalan Tykistörykmentti, KARTR)
  - 1st Field Artillery Battery (1. Kenttätykistöpatteri)
  - 2nd Field Artillery Battery (2. Kenttätykistöpatteri)
  - Mortar Company (Kranaatinheitinkomppania)
- Salpausselkä Air Defense Battalion (Salpausselän Ilmatorjuntapatteristo, SALPITPSTO)
  - 1st Air Defense Battery (1. Ilmatorjuntapatteri)
  - 2nd Air Defense Battery (2. Ilmatorjuntapatteri)
  - 3rd Air Defense Battery (3. Ilmatorjuntapatteri)
- Kymi Engineer Battalion (Kymen Pioneeripataljoona, KYMPIONP)
  - 1st Engineer Company (1. Pioneerikomppania)
  - 2nd Engineer Company (2. Pioneerikomppania)
  - EOD Company (Raivaajakomppania)
- East Finland Signal Battalion (Itä-Suomen Viestipataljoona, I-SVP)
  - HQ Company (Esikuntakomppania)
  - 1st Signals Company (1. Viestikomppania)
  - 2nd Signals Company (2. Viestikomppania)
- Karelia Logistics Battalion (Karjalan Huoltopataljoona, KARHP)
  - 1st Supply Company (1. Huoltokomppania)
  - 2nd Supply Company (2. Huoltokomppania)
  - Materiel Centre (Materiaalikeskus)
  - Maintenance Centre (Kunnossapitokeskus)
  - Transportation Centre (Kuljetuskeskus)
  - Driving School (Autokoulu)
Colours of the battalion-level units
Kymi Jaeger Battalion

East Finland Signal Battalion

Salpausselkä Air Defence Battalion

Karelia Artillery Regiment

Kymi Engineer Battalion

Karelia Logistics Battalion
