= Kainuu Brigade =

Brigade of the Finnish Army

- Kainuun prikaati
- Insignia of the Kainuu Brigade
- Active: 1966—: Kainuun prikaati (Kainuu brigade)
- Country: Finland
- Branch: Finnish Army
- Type: Readiness Brigade
- Role: Defence of Northern Finland
- Size: 550 career personnel, 2,500 conscripts
- Garrison: Hoikankangas, Kajaani
- Nickname: Kaipeeär
- Colors
- March: Hurtti-Ukko
- Equipment: Sisu Nasu

Commanders
- Brigadier General: Ari Laaksonen

Kainuu brigade (Finnish: Kainuun prikaatti; Swedish: Kajanalands brigad) is a Finnish Army unit situated in Kajaani. The brigade is one of the biggest army units, training approximately 4000 conscripts annually. The Kainuu Brigade is one of the three readiness brigades in the Finnish Army. The brigade trains troops for war-time Kainuu Jäger Brigade.

The Brigade trains units suited for combat on the heavy snow and poor road-infrastructure areas of Northern Finland, and has several variations from normal Finnish Army training schedules and equipment to meet these demands, such as the light tracked all-terrain vehicles used for fast transportation of troops especially during wintertime. The vehicles are also used by heavy (120 mm) mortar companies, who use mortars fixed on these vehicles. The equipment provides inexpensive, unopposed freedom of movement even in difficult off-road and snow conditions.

== Organisation ==
From 17.2.2023, the brigade was organised as shown below:

- Kuopio Logistics battalion (Kuopion huoltopataljoona)
  - Logistics Company (Huoltokomppania)
  - 1st Separate Truck Company (1.Erillinen Autokomppania)
- Kainuu Jaeger battalion (Kainuun jääkäripataljoona)
  - Fast Response Unit (Valmiusyksikkö)
  - 1st Jaeger Company (1. Jääkärikomppania)
  - 2nd Jaeger Company (2. Jääkärikomppania)
  - 3rd Jaeger Company (3. Jääkärikomppania)
- Pohja Engineer battalion (Pohjan pioneeripataljoona)
  - 1st Engineer company (1. Pioneerikomppania)
  - Technical company (Teknillinen komppania)
- Kainuu Artillery Regiment (Kainuun tykistörykmentti)
  - Mortar company (Kranaatinheitinkomppania)
  - 1st Artillery battery (1. Tuliasemapatteri)
  - 2nd Artillery battery (2. Tuliasemapatteri)
- Northern Finland signal battalion (Pohjois-Suomen viestipataljoona)
  - Headquarters company (Esikuntakomppania)
  - 1st Signals company (1. Viestikomppania)
  - 2nd Signals company (2. Viestikomppania)

== Units and training ==
All units of the Brigade train their own specialists and drivers, and all receive a basic infantry jaeger training. All units are equipped with at least light AT fire-and-forget weapons and 12.7 mm anti-air machine guns, that can also be mounted on APCs and is very effective against infantry and lightly armoured vehicles.

Note also that this is the training organisation, not the actual war-time organisation. In this training or peace-time organisation, the Brigade can hoist everything needed on a modern battlefield except for anti-air weapons other than the 12.7 mm machine guns. These units are trained in the Jäger Brigade.

=== Kuopio Logistics Battalion ===
The Kuopio battalion is responsible for training of drivers for various vehicles (for Supply mostly - other battalions train the drivers they need themselves), and supply and munitions personnel. The battalion is also responsible for the training of NCOs for recon and transportation.

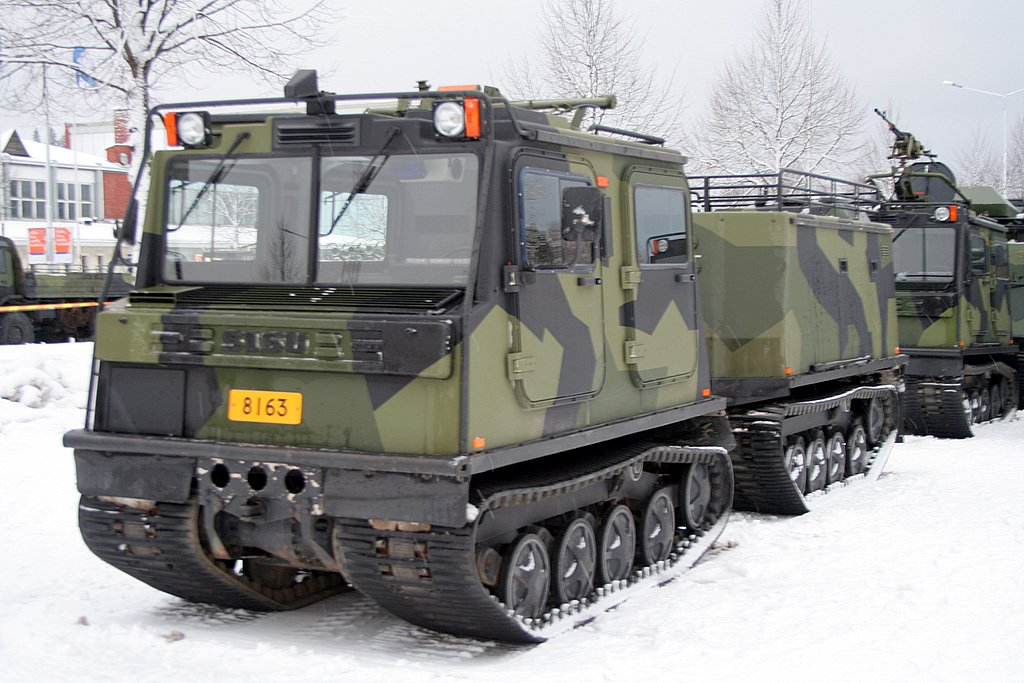
Two Sisu Nasu tracked ATVs from Kainuu brigade.

=== Kainuu jaeger battalion ===
The Jaeger battalion trains the main body of the brigade - the infantry. It also trains NCOs for infantry. The battalion is equipped with the tracked, non-armoured vehicles (telakuorma-auto) which make it very fast even off-road and in high snow. The battalion is equipped with state-of-the-art anti-armor weapons as well as other, lighter and cheaper AT-weapons. It also has modernized Russian 12.7 mm anti-air machine guns (as do other battalions) and the light 81 mm mortars. As all Finnish jaegers, these troops are taught to be deadly, fast, maneuverable, and silent if need to be. The Battalion also has some Sisu XA-185 "Pasi" APCs.

=== Pohja Pioneer Battalion ===
This battalion trains pioneers and their NCOs. The Battalion includes the 1st Pioneer Company, training of which is concentrated on usage and de-armament of mines and other explosives. The other Company of the Battalion, the Technical Company, focuses on "heavy engineering" such as trench- and bridge building.

=== Kainuu Artillery Regiment ===
The Artillery regiment uses 120 mm heavy mortars fixed on TeKa:s, 122 mm Soviet howitzers and modern 155 K 98 155 mm guns equipped with APU to provide (minor) movement without towing vehicles. It also trains all artillery NCO's, including forward observers and mortar leaders.

=== Northern Finland signal battalion ===
This battalion houses units that are responsible for the usage and building of brigade-scale signal systems. It also trains NCOs for this task. The battalion also has the HQ company (Esikuntakomppania, EK) that trains the military police for the brigade, which also uses the dogs trained by the Kainuu jaegar battalion. MP NCOs are not trained at the brigade, but in Rovaniemi. The recon and "sissi" NCOs specialiced in communications are also trained in Northern Finland signal battalion.

== History and tradition of the Kainuu brigade ==
The brigade has its roots in the Savolax Infantry Regiment of the Thirty Years' War, and the battle of the River Lech on April 5, 1632, which is the traditional day of the brigade. It also holds up the traditions of the men that fought at Suomussalmi, Raate Road and Kuhmo during the Winter War as well as the Rukajärvi-directions 14. Division during the Continuation War.

The honorary march of the brigade is Hurtti-Ukko by Carl Collan.

The brigade's flag is the Kajaani Sissi Battalion's flag from 1920.

Colours of the battalion-level units
Kuopio Logistics Battalion

Kainuu Jaeger Battalion

Pohja Engineer Battalion

Kainuu Artillery Regiment

North Finland Signal Battalion
