= Jerrold R. Zacharias =

American nuclear physicist (1905–1986)

Jerrold Reinach Zacharias
- Born: January 23, 1905; Jacksonville, Florida
- Died: July 16, 1986 (aged 81)
- Education: Columbia University
- Awards: Oersted Medal (1961)
- Scientific career
- Fields: Physics
- Workplaces: Massachusetts Institute of Technology
- Thesis: The temperature dependence of Young's modulus for nickel (1934)
- Doctoral advisor: Shirley Leon Quimby
- Doctoral students: John G. King (1953), Rainer Weiss (1962)

Jerrold Reinach Zacharias (January 23, 1905 – July 16, 1986) was an American physicist and institute professor at the Massachusetts Institute of Technology, as well as an education reformer. His scientific work was in the area of nuclear physics.

== Biography ==
Jerrold Zacharias was born on January 23, 1905, in Jacksonville, Florida. He went to Columbia University, where physicist I. I. Rabi became his mentor. He earned his B.A. from Columbia College in 1926 and his Ph.D. from Columbia University in 1931.

During World War II, Zacharias was involved in both the Radiation Laboratory at MIT and the Manhattan Project. In the former he helped develop practical radar uses for the United States Navy and in the latter he was head of an engineering division at Los Alamos Laboratory.

He helped build the MIT physics department after the war, and was responsible for recruiting Bruno Rossi and Victor Weisskopf to the Institute. During the Cold War he was the head of a number of defense-related studies hosted at MIT, such as Project Hartwell, Project Charles, and Project Lamp Light. The Danish-American physicist Charles Lauritsen was also part of some of these projects.

In 1952 at the MIT Lincoln Laboratory, which had recently been founded to study issues of air defense, the Lincoln Summer Study Group took place, where physicist J. Robert Oppenheimer other scientists urged that resources be allocated to air defense in preference to large retaliatory nuclear strike capabilities. This stance was objected to by the United States Air Force, and in 1953 an anonymous, Air Force-sponsored article was published in Fortune that made the baseless accusation that Zacharias was part of a cabal of dissident physicists known as "ZORC" (Zacharias, Oppenheimer, Rabi, Charles Lauritsen) that was attempting to do damage to U.S. national security. The subject of this non-existent cabal again came up during the Oppenheimer security hearing of 1954 when Zacharias denied a witness's claim to having seen the initials written on an MIT blackboard.

Zacharias developed the first practical version of the cesium-beam clock, often called an "atomic clock". Developed in 1956, it later became the internationally accepted standard for timekeeping.

Concerned that traditional physics education at the secondary school level failed to convey a sense of excitement and inquiry, and a way of thinking about physics beyond rote memorization of equations, Zacharias both founded and ran the Physical Science Study Committee (PSSC). Begun in 1956, it gained additional funding and emphasis in the wake of the Sputnik crisis of 1957, and within ten years half of the country's high school physics students were using the PSSC curriculum of textbooks and experiments.

He was awarded the Oersted Medal in 1961 for contributions to the teaching of physics. President John F. Kennedy said that year that Zacharias had "started a revolution in science teaching in the United States."

During the Lyndon B. Johnson administration, Zacharias worked for the White House's Office of Science and Technology. In the mid 1960s he hosted a series of lectures at Tufts University which acted as the spark for the formation of the pioneering artists-in-the-schools organization Teachers & Writers Collaborative. Zacharias continued to push for educational reform throughout the 1960s and 1970s through such projects as Elementary Science Study and the educational TV series Infinity Factory. He was also the founder of Education Development Center, a global nonprofit that develops science and math curricula.

Zacharias died in 1986 at age 81. Zacharias' wife, Leona Zacharias was a scientist, researcher, and lecturer at Massachusetts Eye and Ear.

Katie Hafner is their granddaughter.

== See also ==
- Physical Science Study Committee
