= Humboldt (crater) =

Crater on the Moon

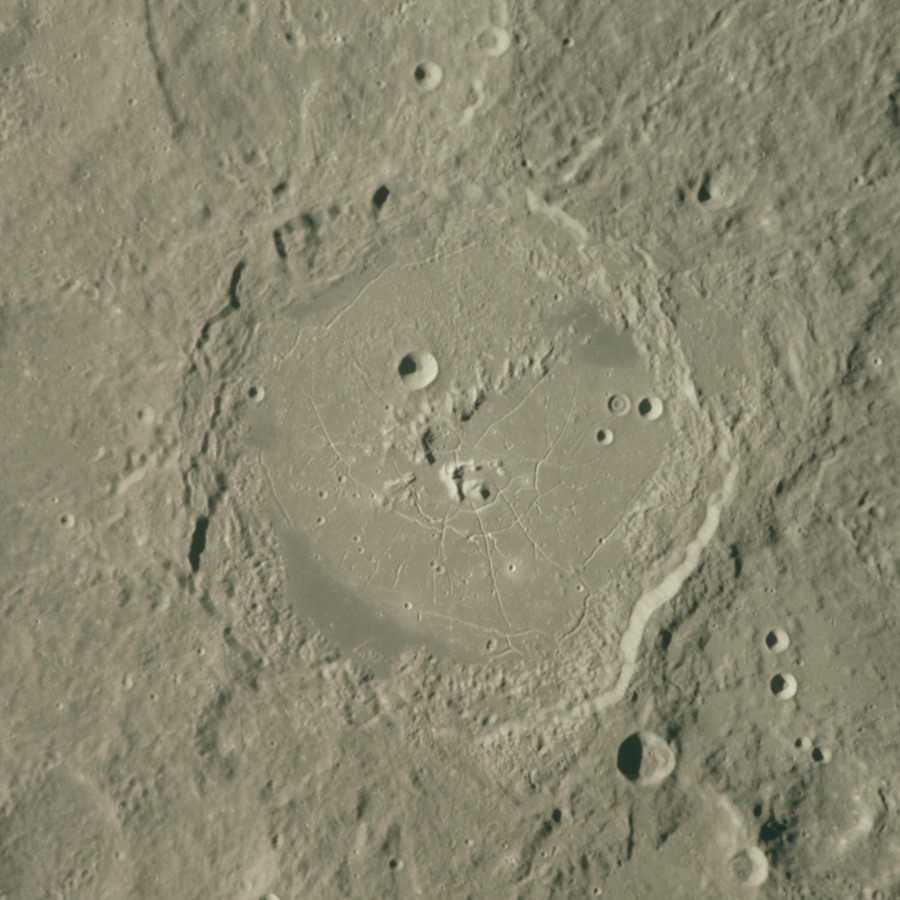
- Apollo 15 image
- Coordinates: 27.02°S 80.96°E
- Diameter: 199.46 km (123.94 mi)
- Depth: 3.69 km (2.29 mi)
- Colongitude: 254° at sunrise
- Formation: Upper Imbrian
- Eponym: Wilhelm von Humboldt

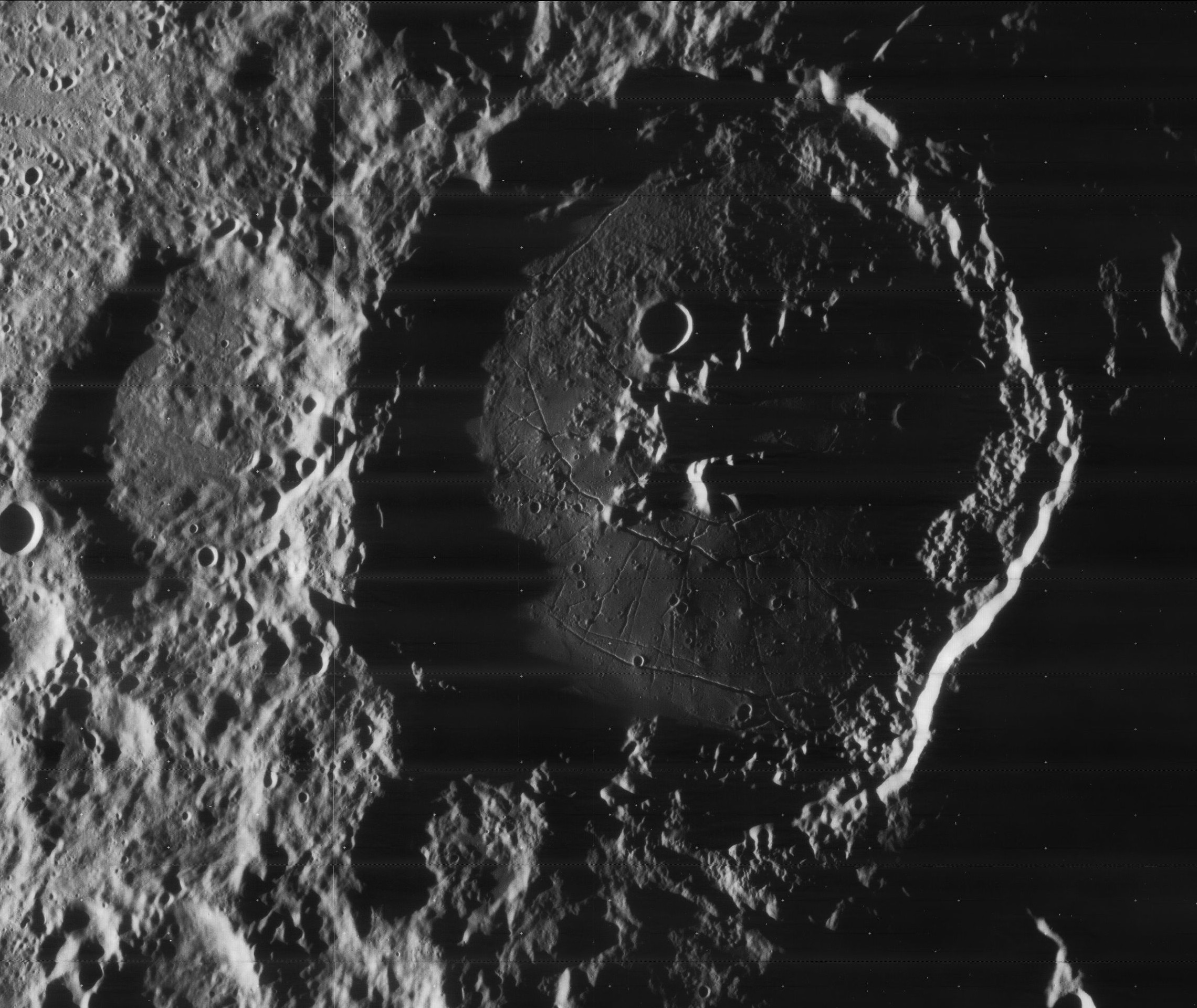
Lunar Orbiter 4 image of Humboldt (right) and the smaller Phillips (left)

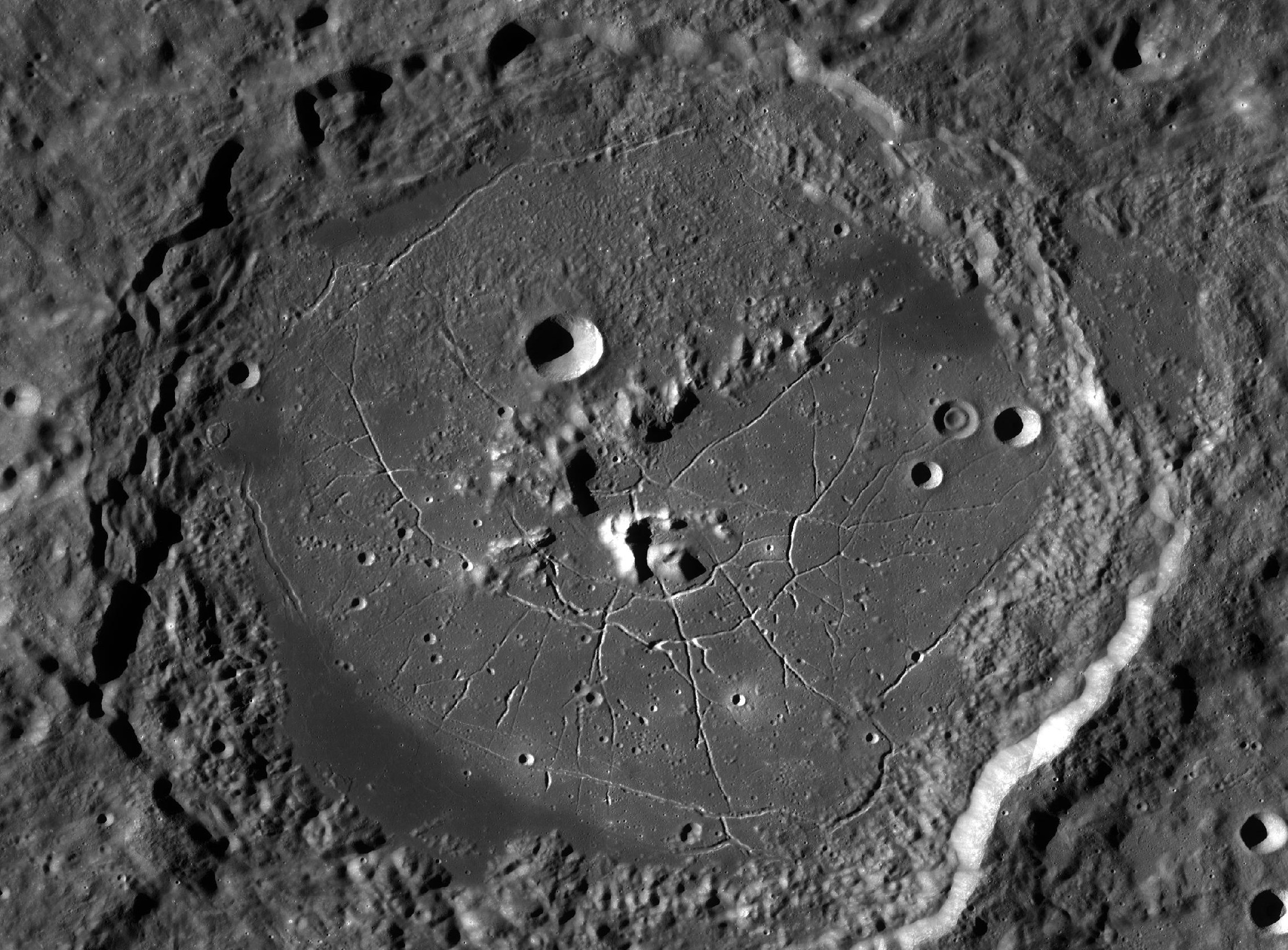
LRO mosaic

Humboldt is a large lunar impact crater that is located near the eastern limb of the Moon. British astronomer T. W. Webb notes this is "one of several huge rings on the limb." Due to foreshortening this formation has an extremely oblong appearance. The actual shape of the crater is an irregular circle, with a significant indentation along the southeastern rim where the prominent crater Barnard intrudes. To the north-northwest of Humboldt is the large crater Hecataeus. Phillips is attached to the western rim.

On the lunar geologic timescale, Humboldt is one of the largest craters of Upper (Late) Imbrian age. The rim of Humboldt is low, worn, and irregular in outline. The central peak forms a range on the crater floor. The infrared spectrum of pure crystalline plagioclase has been identified on this rise. The floor surface contains a network of rilles forming a pattern of radial spokes and concentric arcs, making this a floor-fractured crater. There are also some dark patches located near the walls to the northeast, northwest, and southeast.

There is a chain of craters leading from the northwest crater rim to a distance almost as long as the crater is wide. This formation is designated Catena Humboldt. Due to its location near the lunar limb, little detail was known about this crater until it was photographed by orbiting spacecraft (mainly Lunar Orbiter 4).

The crater was named after German philologist Wilhelm von Humboldt by the IAU.

== Satellite craters ==
By convention these features are identified on lunar maps by placing the letter on the side of the crater midpoint that is closest to Humboldt. Humboldt N is the largest crater within Humboldt itself, located north of the central peak. Humboldt B is located to the south of Humboldt, on the west rim of the crater Barnard.

Humboldt	Latitude	Longitude	Diameter
B	30.9° S	83.7° E	21 km
N	26.0° S	80.5° E	14 km

== Catena Humboldt ==
Catena Humboldt is a crater chain that extends northeast from crater Humboldt, and it is approximately 162 km long. It was named by the IAU in 1976. It passes between the craters Gibbs and Schorr.

== Apollo 12 Views ==
The Apollo 12 mission in 1969 obtained many photographs of Humboldt crater. In the photos below, the central peaks appear white because of the high-Sun elevation angle. The arcuate fractures within Humboldt are evidence of the forces working on the surface of the Moon to change the lunar topography.

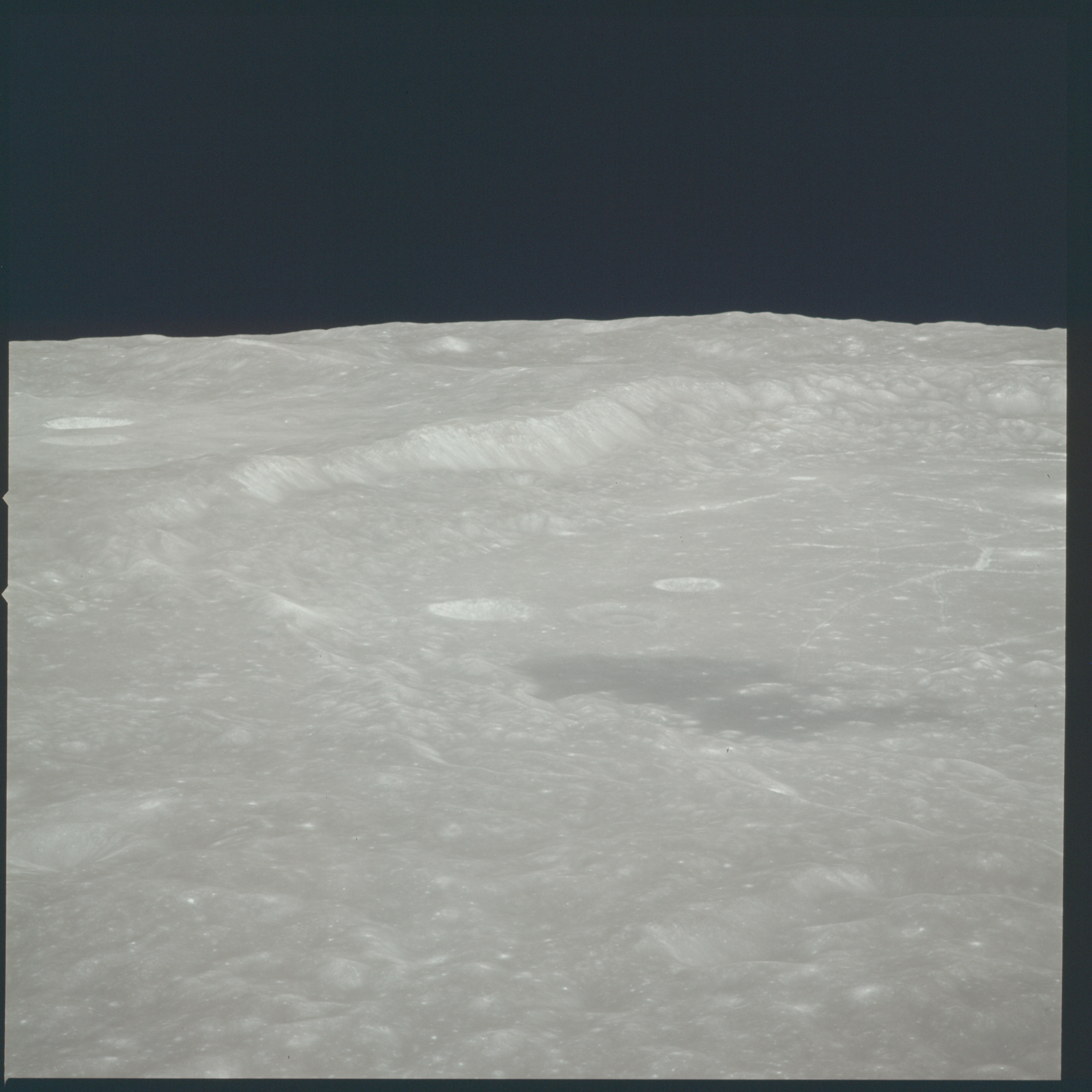

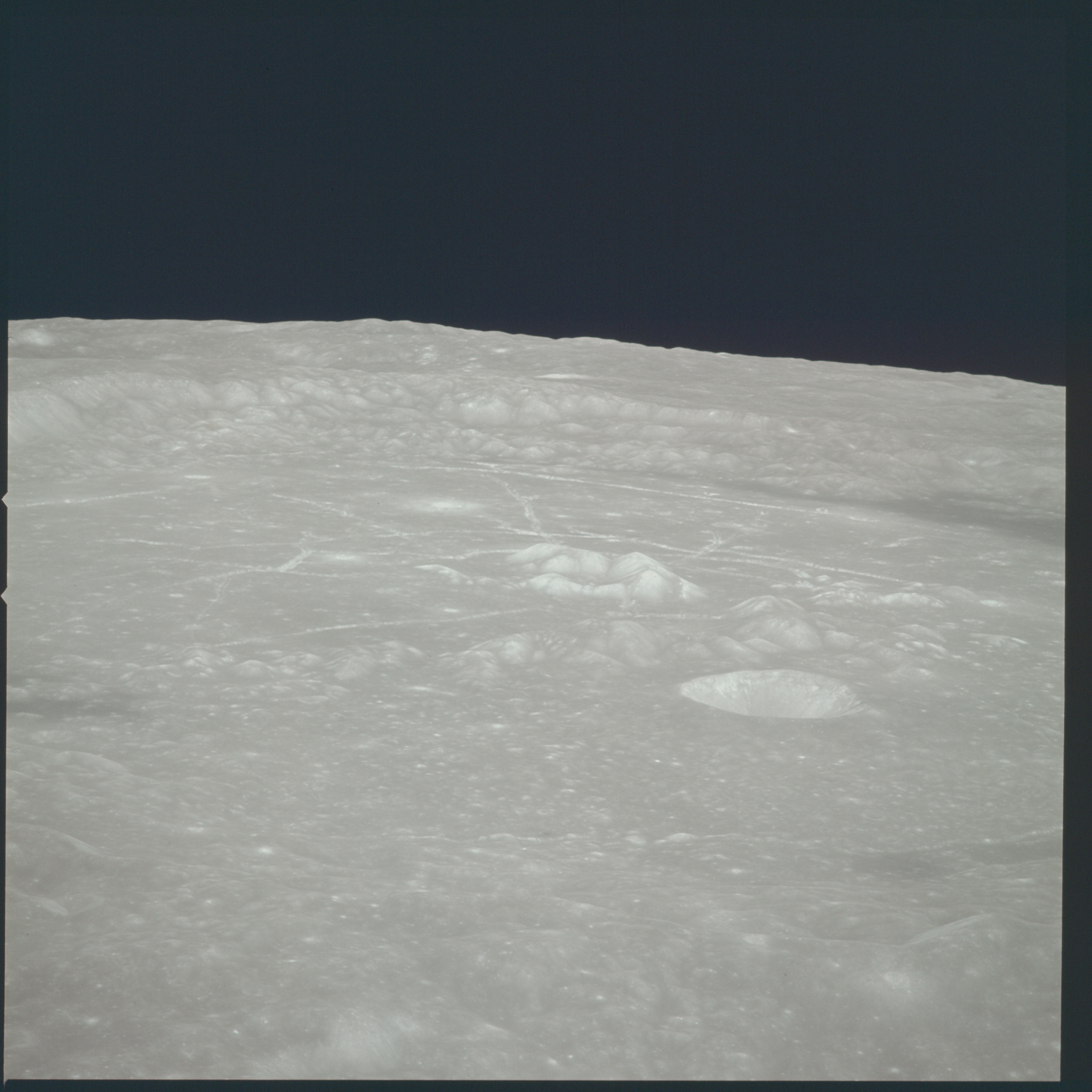

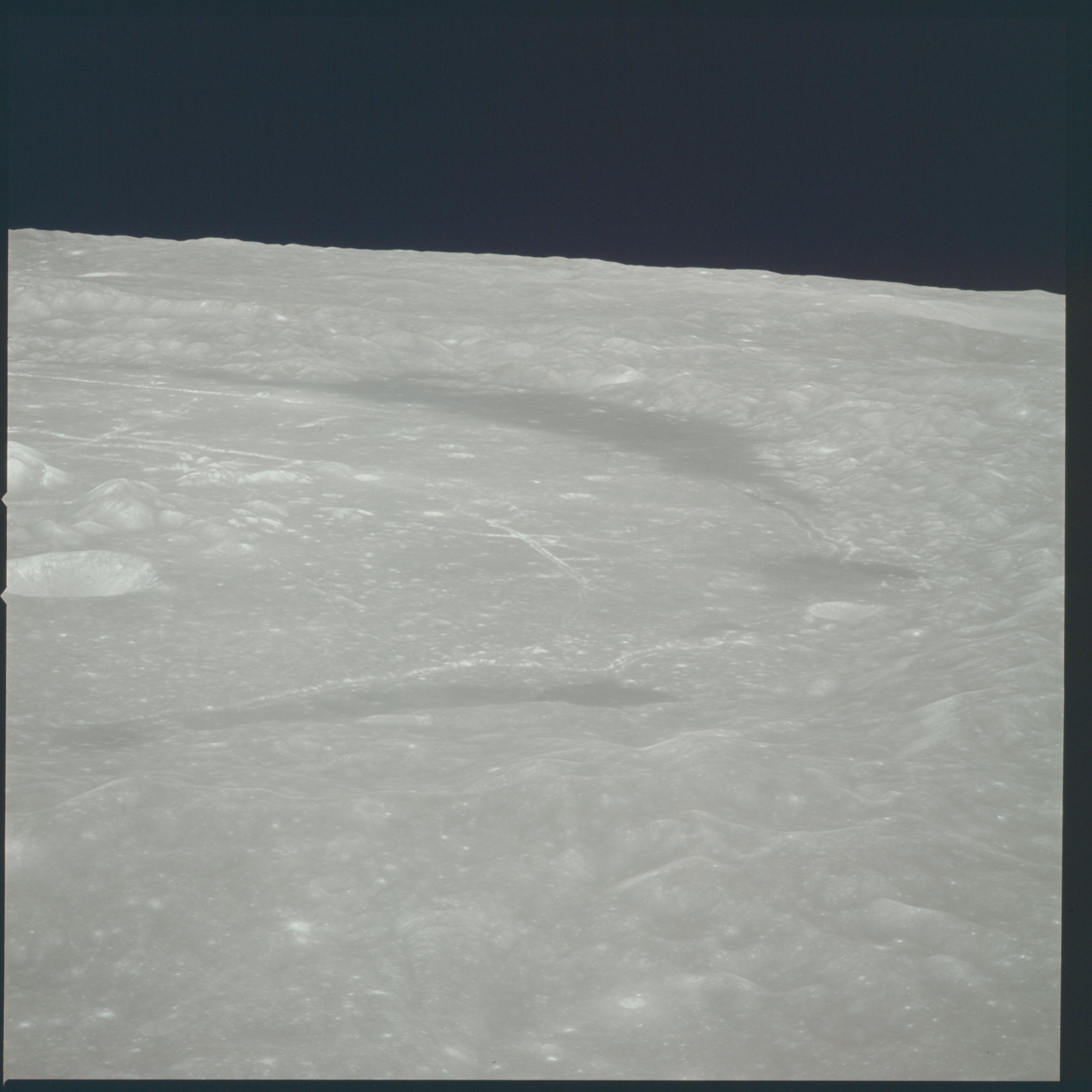

== Apollo 15 Views ==
The Apollo 15 mission in 1971 obtained many more photographs of Humboldt crater.

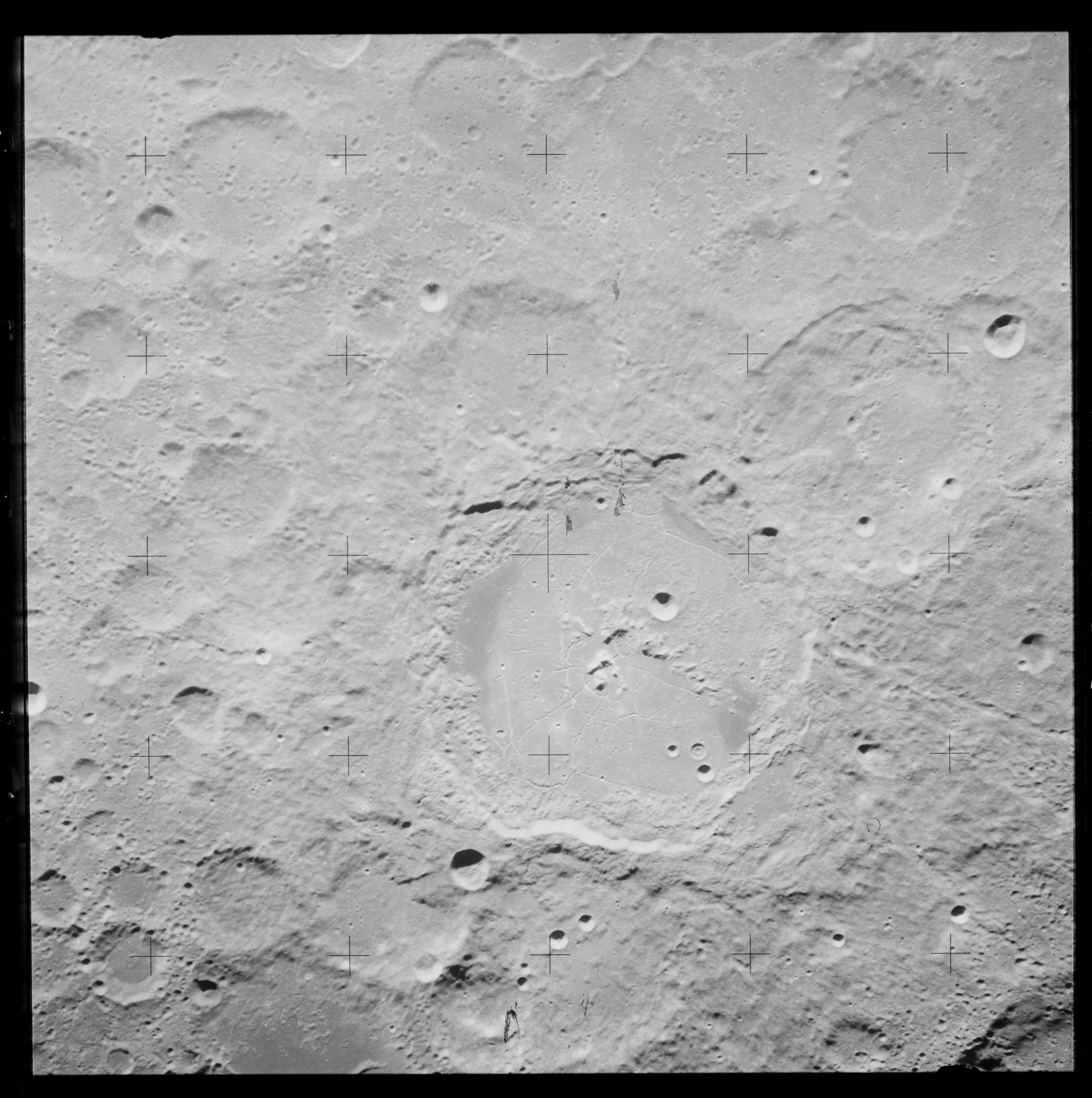
Regional view

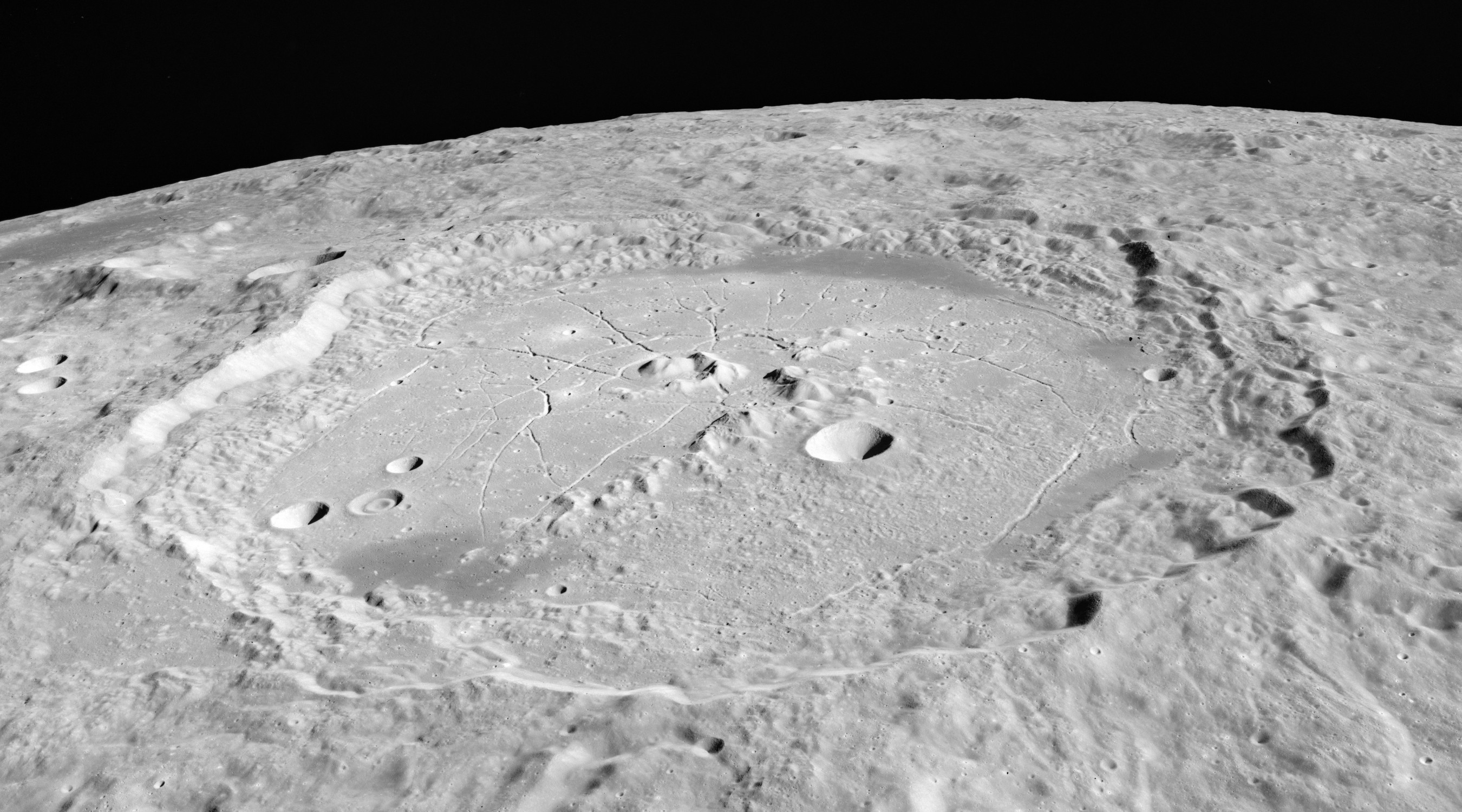
Oblique view of Humboldt from Apollo 15 mapping camera

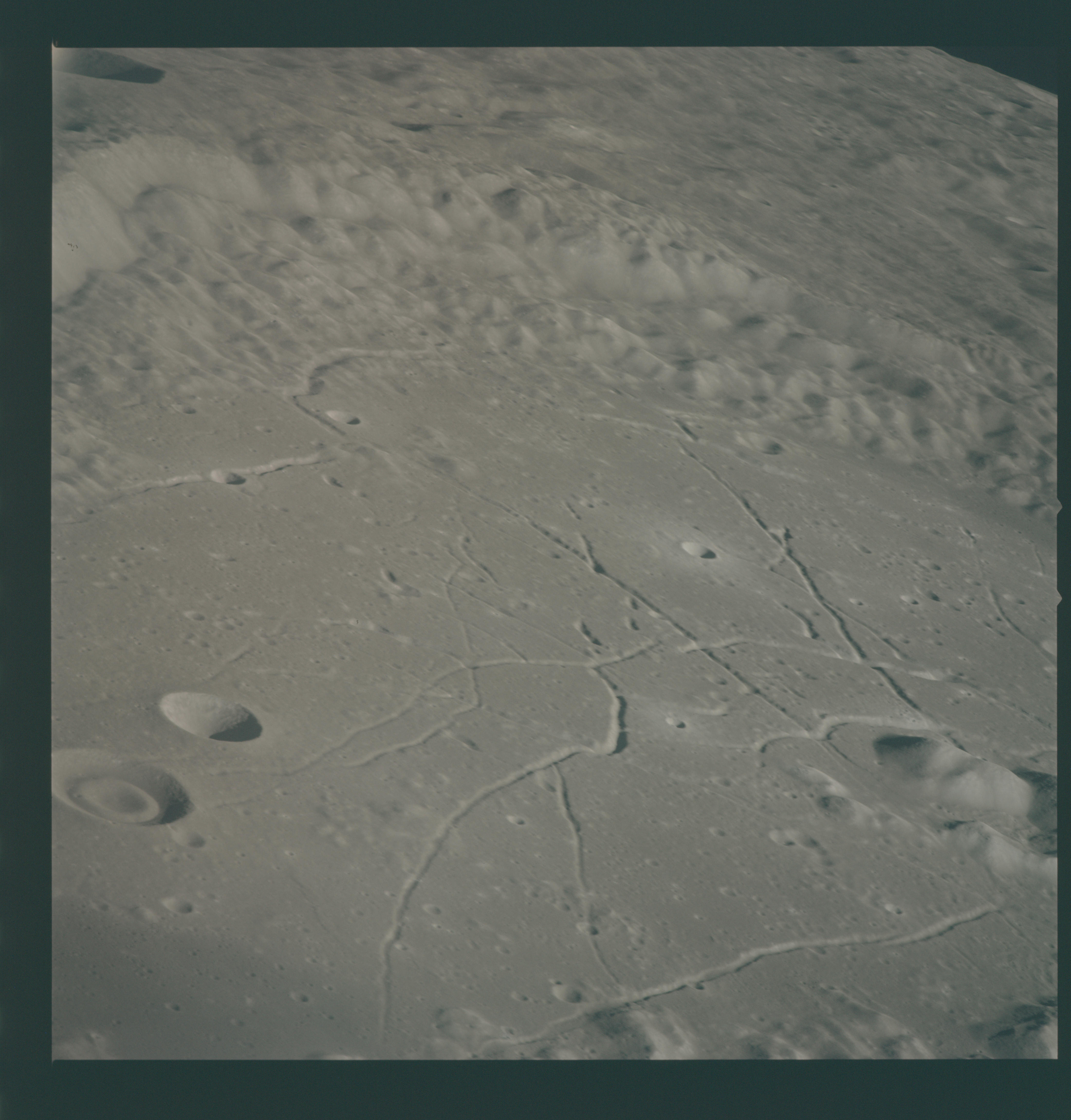
Eastern crater floor. The mare-type material on the floor contains radial cracks and concentric rilles. A dark-halo area is visible at the lower left corner. Low hills of material that resemble the central peak protrude through the smooth crater floor. Bright-halo craters are also evident. The "doughnut" filling of the crater at the left margin is a rare feature.
