= 2937 Gibbs =

Asteroid

Discovery
- Discovered by: E. Bowell
- Discovery site: Anderson Mesa Stn.
- Discovery date: 14 June 1980

Designations
- Named after: Josiah Willard Gibbs (American scientist)
- Alternative designations: 1980 LA
- Minor planet category: Mars-crosser · Phocaea

Orbital characteristics
- Epoch 4 September 2017 (JD 2458000.5)
- Uncertainty parameter 0
- Observation arc: 36.75 yr (13,424 days)
- Aphelion: 3.0232 AU
- Perihelion: 1.6160 AU
- Semi-major axis: 2.3196 AU
- Eccentricity: 0.3033
- Orbital period (sidereal): 3.53 yr (1,290 days)
- Mean anomaly: 161.70°
- Mean motion: 0° 16^{m} 44.4^{s} / day
- Inclination: 21.758°
- Longitude of ascending node: 265.72°
- Argument of perihelion: 71.849°

Physical characteristics
- Dimensions: 5.04±1.43 km 5.99±1.20 km 6.35 km (calculated)
- Synodic rotation period: 3.06±0.05 h 3.06153±0.00006 h 3.189±0.003 h (Note: Lightcurve plot for (2937) Gibbs. Robert D. Stephens (2016). Rotation period of 3.189±0.003 hours with a brightness amplitude of 0.26 mag. Quality Code of 3. Summary figures at the CS3 website and at the LCDB)
- Geometric albedo: 0.23 (assumed); 0.283±0.113; 0.30±0.13
- Spectral type: S
- Absolute magnitude (H): 13.10 · 13.2 · 13.42

2937 Gibbs, provisional designation 1980 LA, is a stony Phocaea asteroid and Mars-crosser from the inner regions of the asteroid belt, approximately 6 kilometers in diameter. It was discovered on 14 June 1980, by American astronomer Edward Bowell at Lowell's Anderson Mesa Station near Flagstaff, Arizona. The asteroid was named after American scientist Josiah Willard Gibbs.

== Orbit and classification ==
Gibbs is a Mars-crossing asteroid, as it crosses the orbit of Mars at 1.666 AU. It is also an eccentric member of the Phocaea family, a large asteroid family of stony asteroids in the inner main-belt. Gibbs orbits the Sun at a distance of 1.6–3.0 AU once every 3 years and 6 months (1,290 days). Its orbit has an eccentricity of 0.30 and an inclination of 22° with respect to the ecliptic.

The asteroid's observation arc begins with its official discovery observation at Anderson Mesa. No prior identifications were made and no precoveries taken.

== Physical characteristics ==
Gibbs is an assumed stony S-type asteroid, which agrees with the overall spectral type of the Phocaea family.

=== Rotation period ===
In 2005, two rotational lightcurves of Gibbs were obtained from photometric observations by Italian amateur astronomers Federico Manzini and Roberto Crippa. Lightcurve analysis gave a rotation period of 3.06 and 3.06153 hours with a brightness variation of 0.31 and 0.39 magnitude, respectively (U=2/3-). In December 2016, Robert Stephens obtained a well-defined lightcurve at his Trojan Station (U81) that gave a period of 3.189 hours and an amplitude of 0.26 magnitude (U=3).

=== Diameter and albedo ===
According to the survey carried out by the NEOWISE mission of NASA's Wide-field Infrared Survey Explorer, Gibbs measures between 5.04 and 5.99 kilometers in diameter and its surface has an albedo between 0.283 and 0.30, while the Collaborative Asteroid Lightcurve Link assumes an albedo of 0.23 – derived from 25 Phocaea, the Phocaea family's largest member and namesake – and calculates a diameter of 6.35 kilometers based on an absolute magnitude of 13.2.

== Naming ==
This minor planet was named in memory of American mathematician and physicist Josiah Willard Gibbs (1839–1903), who contributed to the studies of asteroids through his work on orbits. The official naming citation was published by the Minor Planet Center on 17 February 1984 (M.P.C. 8544). The lunar crater Gibbs was also named in his honor.
