= Curie (lunar crater) =

Lunar impact crater

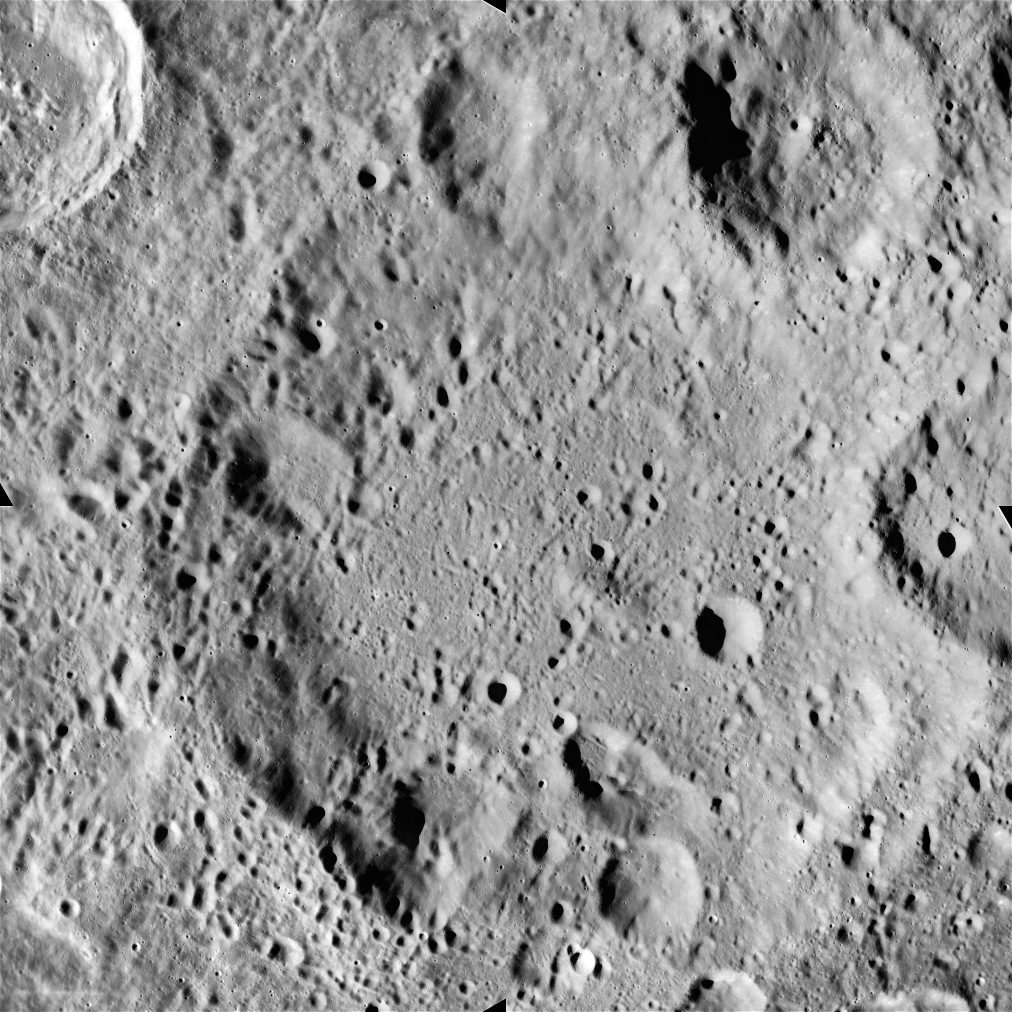
- Curie from Apollo 15. NASA photo.
- Coordinates: 22.9°S 91.0°E
- Diameter: 138.87 km (86.29 mi)
- Depth: Unknown
- Colongitude: 271° at sunrise
- Formation: Pre-Nectarian
- Eponym: Pierre Curie

Curie is a large, degraded lunar impact crater that lies along western rim and extends into the far side of the Moon. Hence, as seen from the Earth, it can only be viewed from the side, with visibility depending on the effects of libration. Curie crosses the northern edge of the proposed Australe megabasin. Nearby craters of note include Schorr to the northwest and the walled plain called Sklodowska to the northeast. Attached to the southeastern rim is the heavily damaged walled plain Lauritsen. Both Sklodowska and Lauritsen are smaller than Curie.

This crater is named after French physicist and chemist Pierre Curie (1859–1906). Its designation was formally adopted by the International Astronomical Union in 1970.

== Observations ==
This formation dates to the Pre-Nectarian period of the lunar geologic timescale. The outer rim of Curie has been damaged and reshaped by nearby impacts. The sides of the rim are relatively linear, giving the crater an overall box-like shape. The eastern part of the rim is partly overlaid by the notable satellite craters Curie C to the northeast and Curie G along the east. At the northern end the rim is overlaid by the small crater Curie Z. Several other small craters lie along the rim, especially to the southwest.

The interior floor of Curie forms a relatively level plain, at least in comparison to the terrain that surrounds the crater. However this floor is disrupted in several locations by small impacts. A cluster of such impacts lies near the southwestern rim, with several of these craters overlapping each other. The small crater Curie K is located in the southeastern part of the floor, and Curie V lies alongside the northwestern inner wall.

== Satellite craters ==
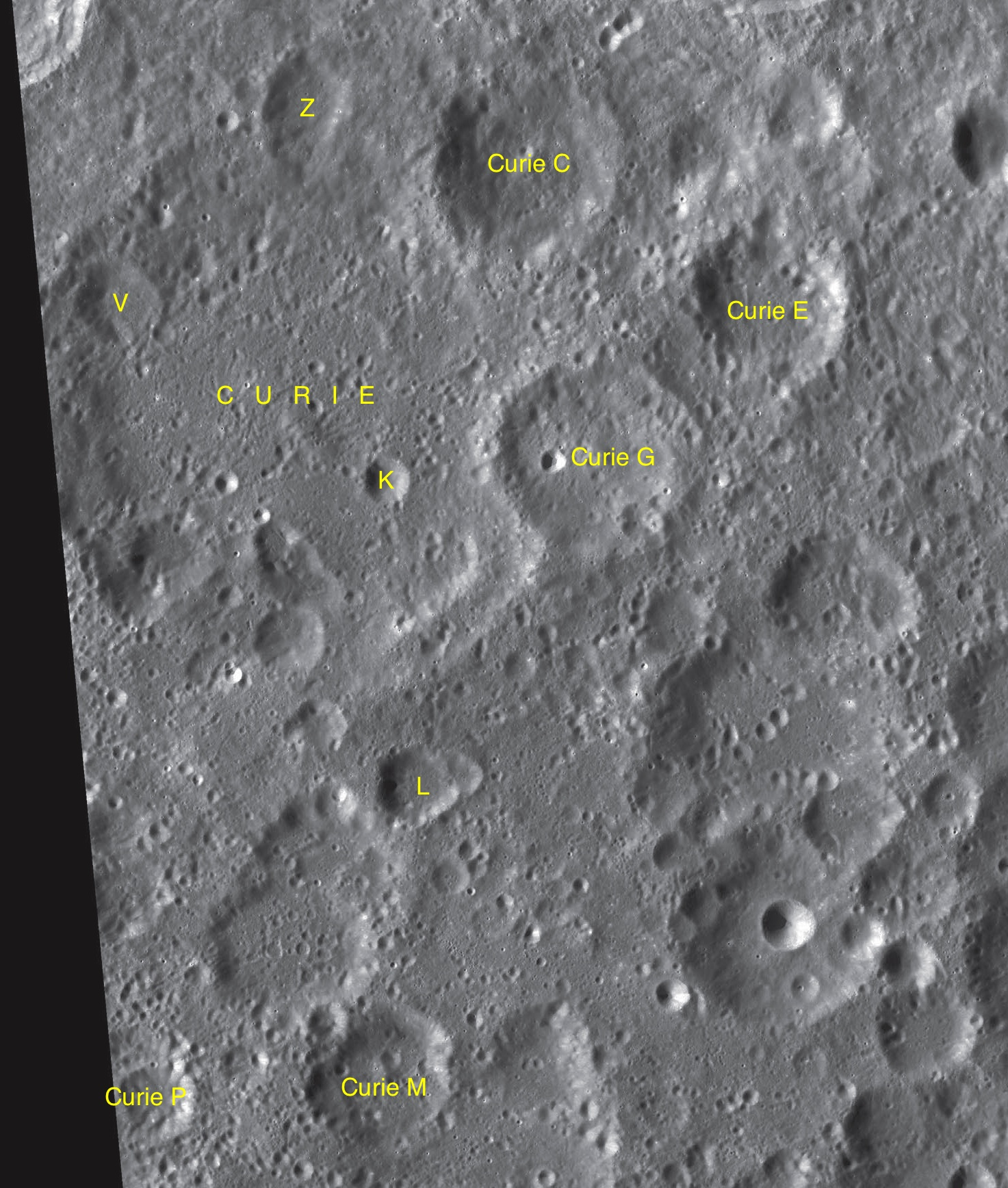
Satellite features of Curie

By convention these features are identified on lunar maps by placing the letter on the side of the crater midpoint that is closest to Curie.

Curie	Latitude	Longitude	Diameter
C	21.1° S	94.1° E	47 km
E	22.4° S	96.2° E	43 km
G	23.6° S	94.8° E	53 km
K	23.7° S	92.7° E	12 km
L	26.3° S	92.8° E	21 km
M	28.4° S	92.5° E	34 km
P	28.4° S	90.1° E	26 km
V	22.0° S	90.4° E	21 km
Z	20.5° S	92.2° E	25 km
