= Lauritsen (crater) =

Crater on the Moon

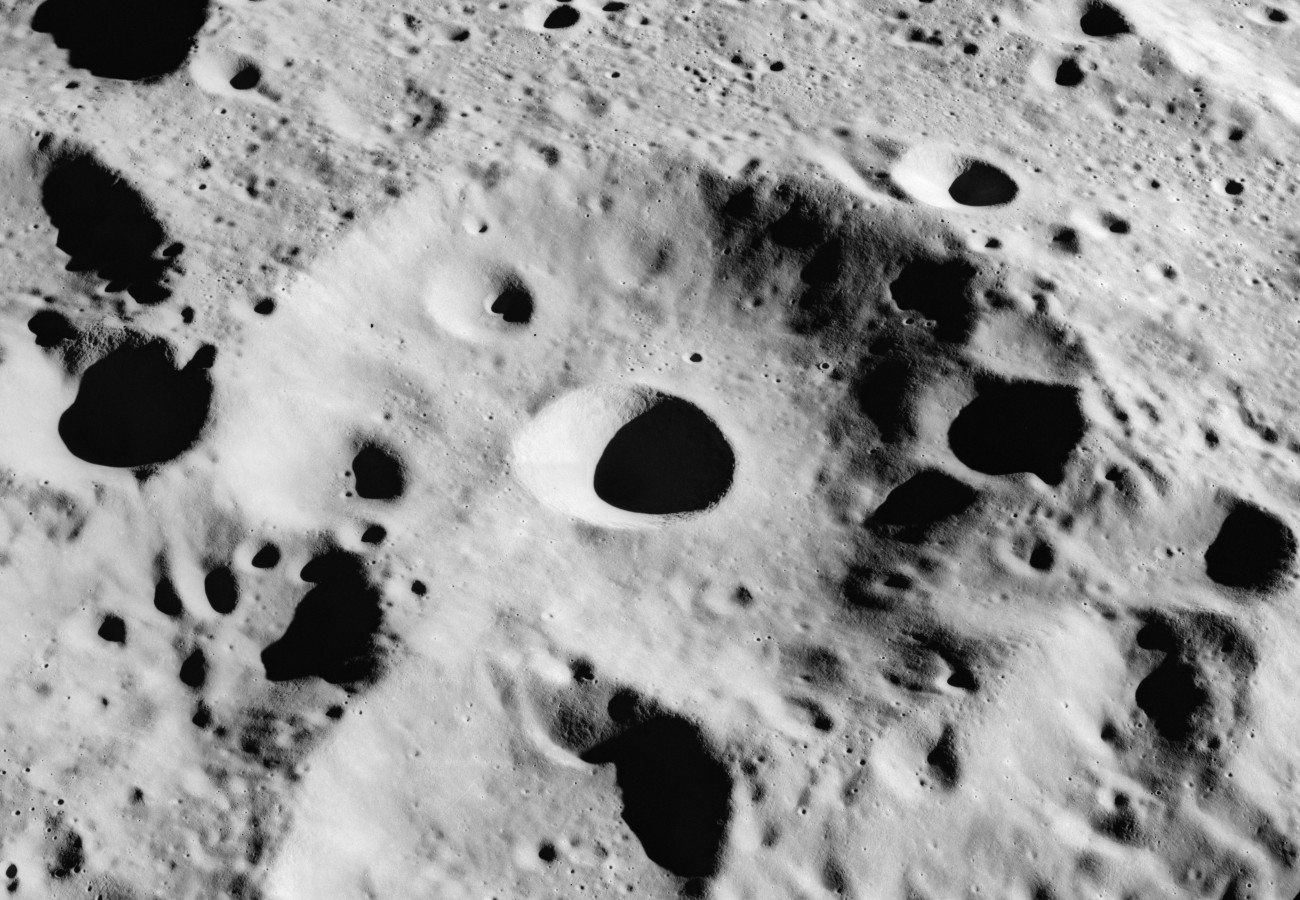
- Oblique Apollo 15 image, facing south
- Coordinates: 27.6°S 96.1°E
- Diameter: 52 km
- Depth: Unknown
- Colongitude: 264° at sunrise
- Eponym: Charles C. Lauritsen

Lauritsen is a lunar impact crater that is located just behind the east-southeastern limb of the Moon. It is named for physicist Charles Christian Lauritsen. While it lies on the far side from the Earth, it is still possible to catch a glimpse of this area under favorable conditions of libration and illumination. The crater is situated roughly equidistant from Titius to the east and Donner to the southeast, so that the three form an equilateral triangle. To the northwest is the walled plain named Curie.

This is an eroded crater with an eastern rim that is almost completely overlain by smaller craters, including Lauritsen B along the northeast. There is a break in the rim to the north and a pair of small craters lies across the northwest rim. Along the southwest side the rim is indented slightly, resulting in a nearly straight length. At the midpoint of the crater is Lauritsen Y, with a smaller crater to its south-southeast.

== Satellite craters ==
By convention these features are identified on lunar maps by placing the letter on the side of the crater midpoint that is closest to Lauritsen.

Lauritsen	Latitude	Longitude	Diameter
A	24.8° S	96.6° E	35 km
B	26.7° S	96.8° E	26 km
G	28.0° S	97.3° E	16 km
H	28.5° S	97.5° E	28 km
Y	27.5° S	96.1° E	14 km
Z	26.0° S	96.2° E	52 km
