= Phillips (lunar crater) =

Lunar impact crater

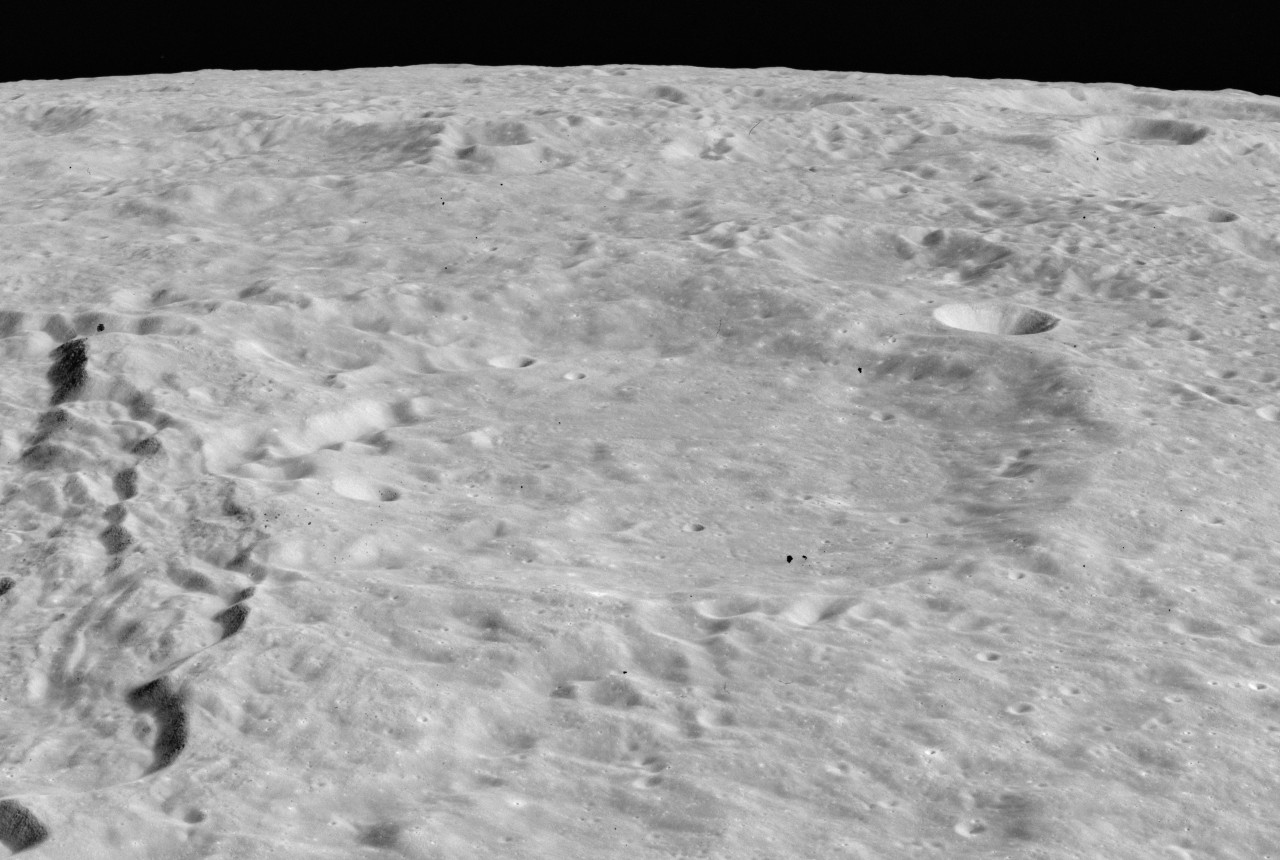
- Oblique Apollo 15 image
- Coordinates: 26.6°S 76.0°E
- Diameter: 124 km
- Colongitude: 286° at sunrise
- Eponym: John Phillips

Phillips is a lunar impact crater that is located in the vicinity of the Moon's east-southeastern limb, named after British geologist John Phillips. A larger walled plain called Humboldt lies across the eastern rim of Phillips, and its outer rampart covers nearly half the interior floor. The surviving rim is eroded in places, and not quite circular.

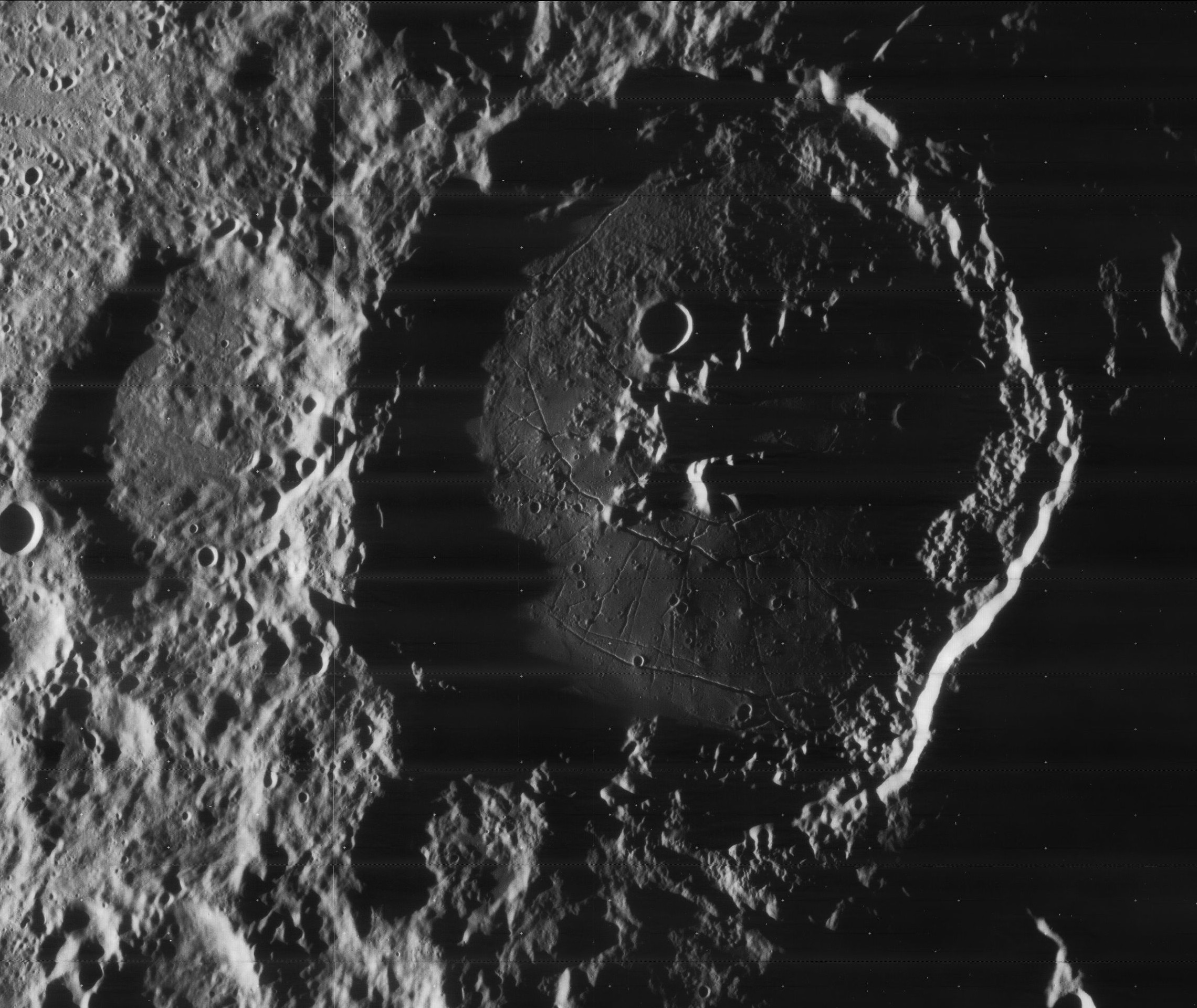
Lunar Orbiter 4 image of Phillips (left) and the larger Humboldt

The northern end of the crater's rim forms an outward-projecting bend, and the inner wall is diminished along that side. There is a small circular crater along the western rim. The interior floor is irregular in places, with a central ridge near the midpoint. To the southwest of Phillips lies the crater Legendre.

== Satellite craters ==
By convention these features are identified on lunar maps by placing the letter on the side of the crater midpoint that is closest to Phillips.

Phillips	Latitude	Longitude	Diameter
A	27.1° S	73.6° E	13 km
B	23.3° S	70.5° E	40 km
C	26.5° S	71.2° E	6 km
D	25.0° S	70.8° E	61 km
E	25.6° S	68.3° E	8 km
F	25.1° S	68.8° E	11 km
G	24.6° S	68.7° E	8 km
H	25.3° S	71.6° E	7 km
W	25.3° S	72.8° E	63 km
