= Sklodowska (lunar crater) =

Crater on the Moon

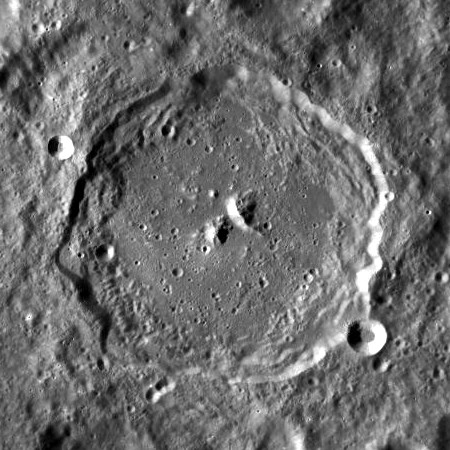
- LRO image
- Coordinates: 18.2°S 95.5°E
- Diameter: 127 km
- Depth: 4.5
- Colongitude: 266° at sunrise
- Eponym: Maria S. Curie

Sklodowska (Skłodowska) is a large lunar impact crater that is located on the far side of the Moon. It lies just past the southeastern limb, and can sometimes be viewed from Earth under favorable conditions of libration and illumination. The crater is located to the northeast of the older walled plain named Curie, and to the southwest of Pasteur, another walled plain.

This is a prominent crater with a well-defined rim and little appearance of wear from impact erosion. The edge forms a rough circle, but it is irregular with a number of small outward bulges, particularly to the south and southwest. The small crater Sklodowska J intrudes slightly into the southeastern rim.

The inner walls have a system of multiple terraces, and there are some slumped shelves along the northeastern side. The inner wall is somewhat narrower along the north and wider to the south and northeast. Within the crater the interior floor is a nearly level plain that is marked by a number of small craterlets. There is a prominent central peak formation at the crater midpoint, which consists of two ridges separated by a narrow valley. The larger of the two peaks lies to the northeast of the center, while the smaller is to the southwest. The infrared spectrum of pure crystalline plagioclase has been identified on this rise.

This crater gained its title from the birth name of Maria Skłodowska-Curie, the Polish and naturalised French scientist.

== Views ==
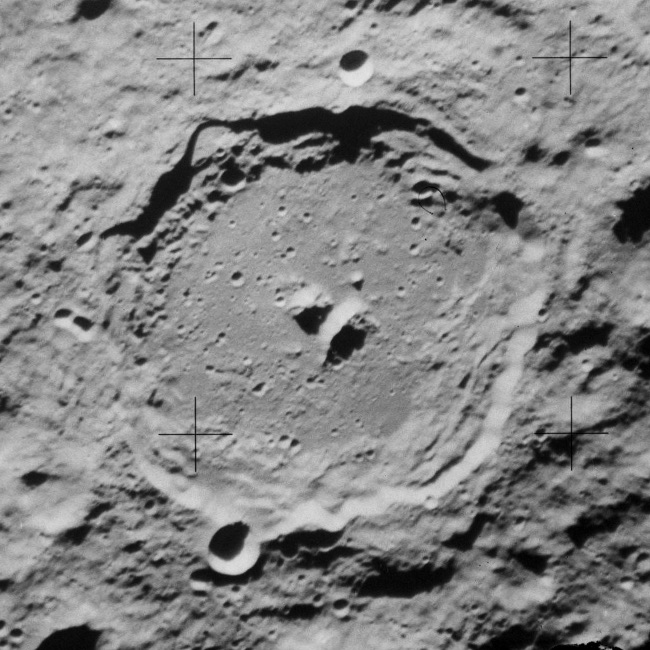
View from Apollo 15

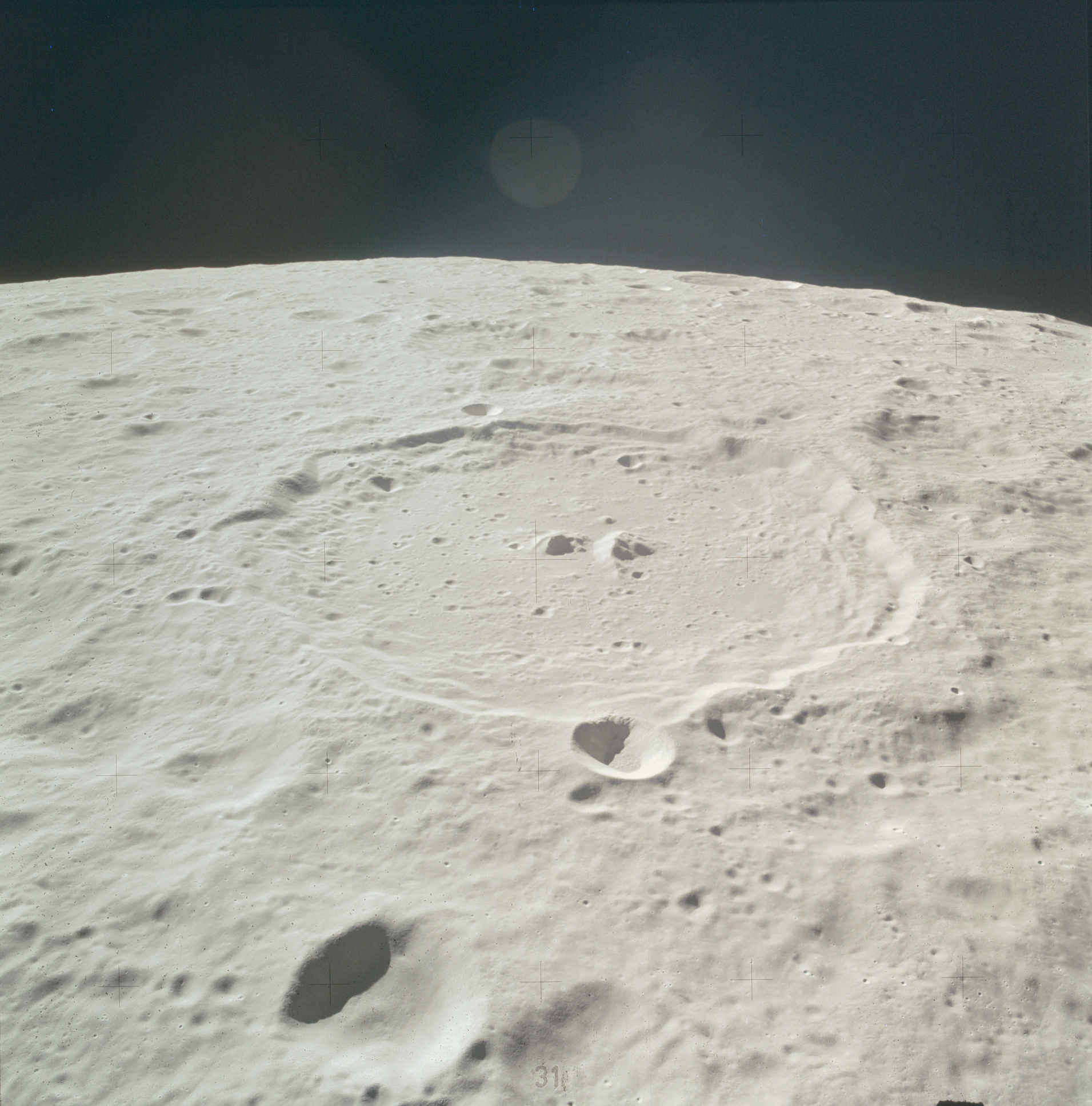
Oblique view from Apollo 15

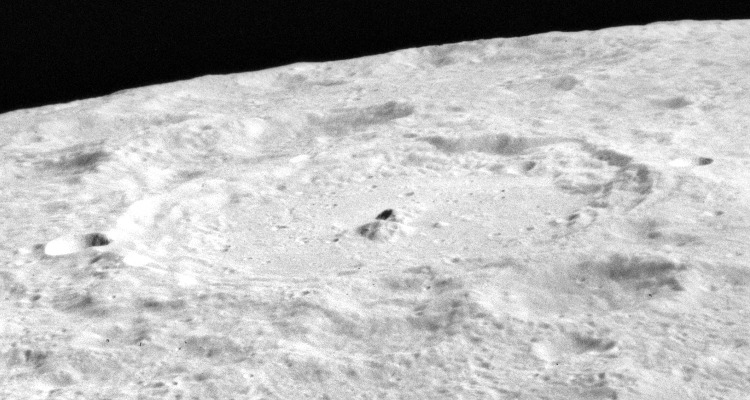
Oblique view from Apollo 16

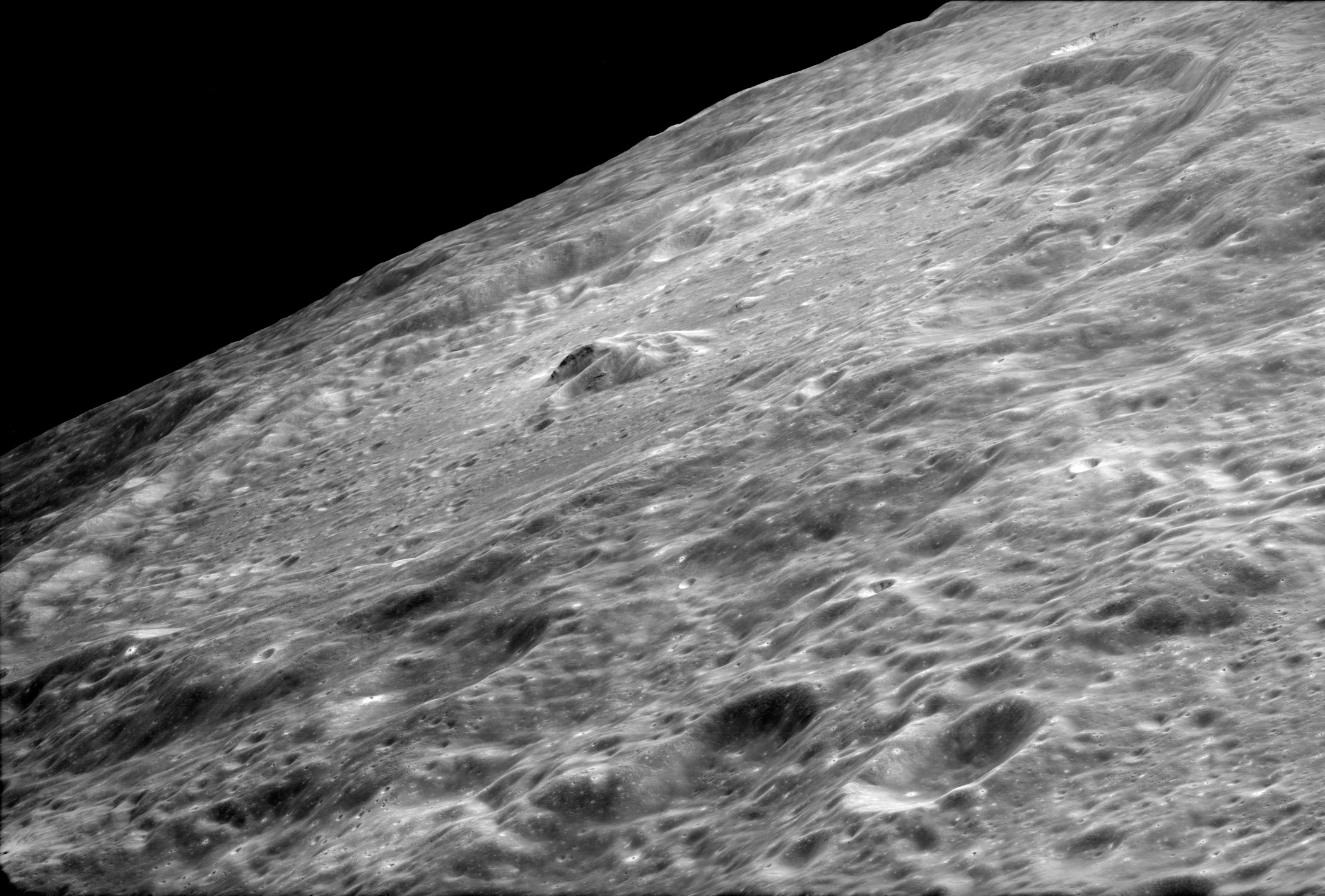
Oblique view facing southwest, from Apollo 17

== Satellite craters ==
By convention these features are identified on lunar maps by placing the letter on the side of the crater midpoint that is closest to Sklodowska.

Sklodowska	Latitude	Longitude	Diameter
A	14.7° S	96.5° E	44 km
D	13.7° S	99.0° E	16 km
J	19.3° S	97.7° E	16 km
R	18.9° S	92.2° E	17 km
Y	13.2° S	95.4° E	17 km
