= Hecataeus (crater) =

Crater on the Moon

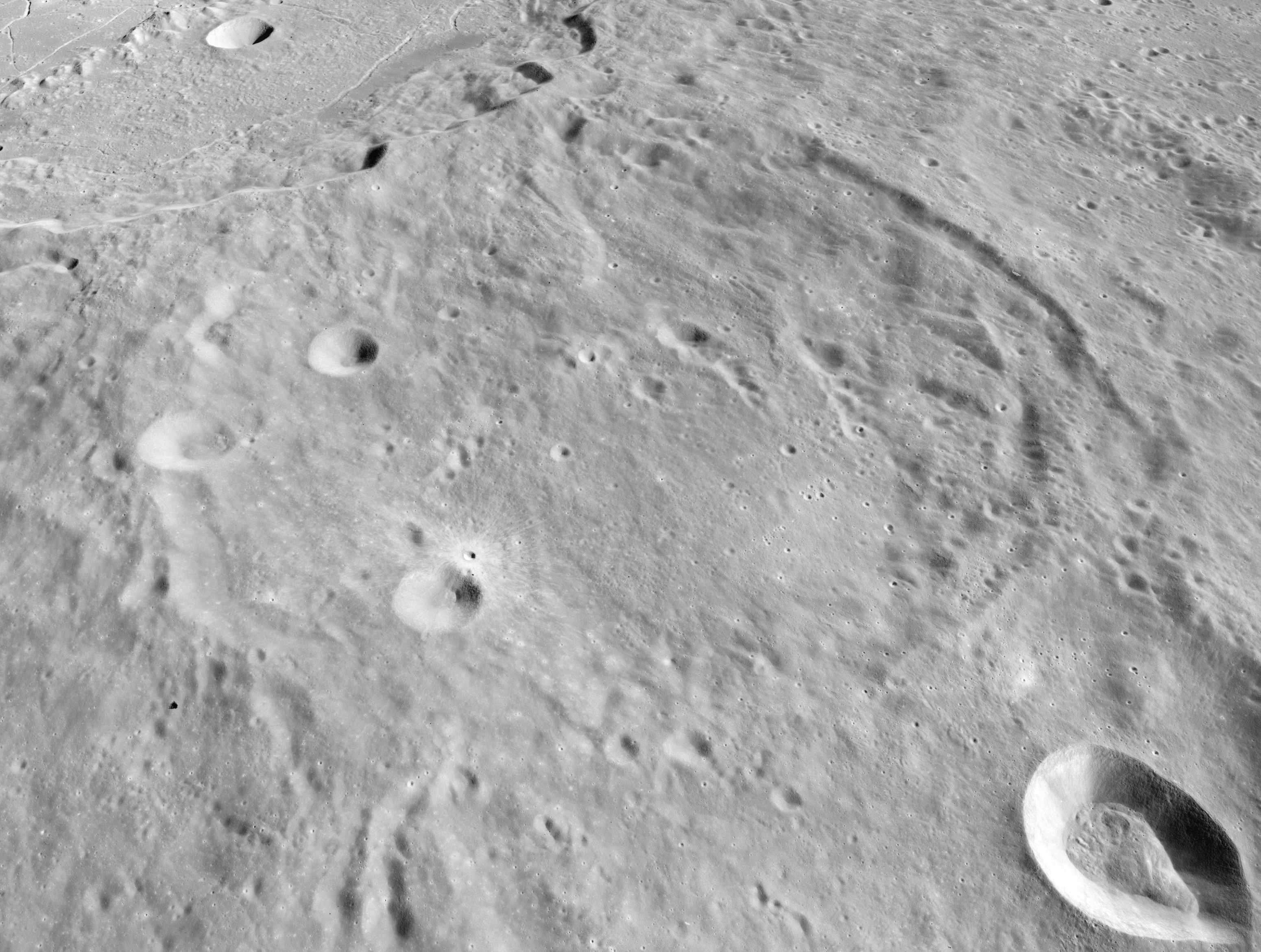
- Oblique view from Apollo 15
- Coordinates: 22.06°S 79.68°E
- Diameter: 133.67 km (83.06 mi)
- Depth: Unknown
- Colongitude: 283° at sunrise
- Eponym: Hecataeus of Miletus

Hecataeus is a large lunar impact crater that lies near the eastern limb of the Moon. It is attached to the northern rim of the walled plain named Humboldt. To the northeast is the smaller crater Gibbs. East of Hecataeus is a chain of small craters forming a line radial to Humboldt; these are designated the Catena Humboldt, named after the walled plain.

Hecataeus is a worn and eroded walled plain with wide inner walls. Its northern part overlies half of Hecataeus K, a fairly substantial crater. Along the southern rim, the outer rampart of ejecta from Humboldt forms a rugged interior surface across the southern floor. Several small, bowl-shaped craters lay across the eastern rim and inner wall. The western rim is much less damaged by impacts, although it is still eroded. The northern part of the interior floor is relatively featureless.

The crater was named after Hecataeus of Miletus by the IAU in 1935.

== Satellite craters ==
By convention these features are identified on lunar maps by placing the letter on the side of the crater midpoint that is closest to Hecataeus.

Hecataeus	Latitude	Longitude	Diameter
A	22.0° S	81.6° E	11 km
B	19.5° S	75.6° E	69 km
C	19.0° S	73.2° E	22 km
E	18.5° S	72.8° E	13 km
J	22.6° S	80.8° E	11 km
K	19.1° S	79.8° E	76 km
L	19.1° S	79.0° E	21 km
M	20.9° S	84.1° E	18 km
N	21.0° S	80.8° E	10 km

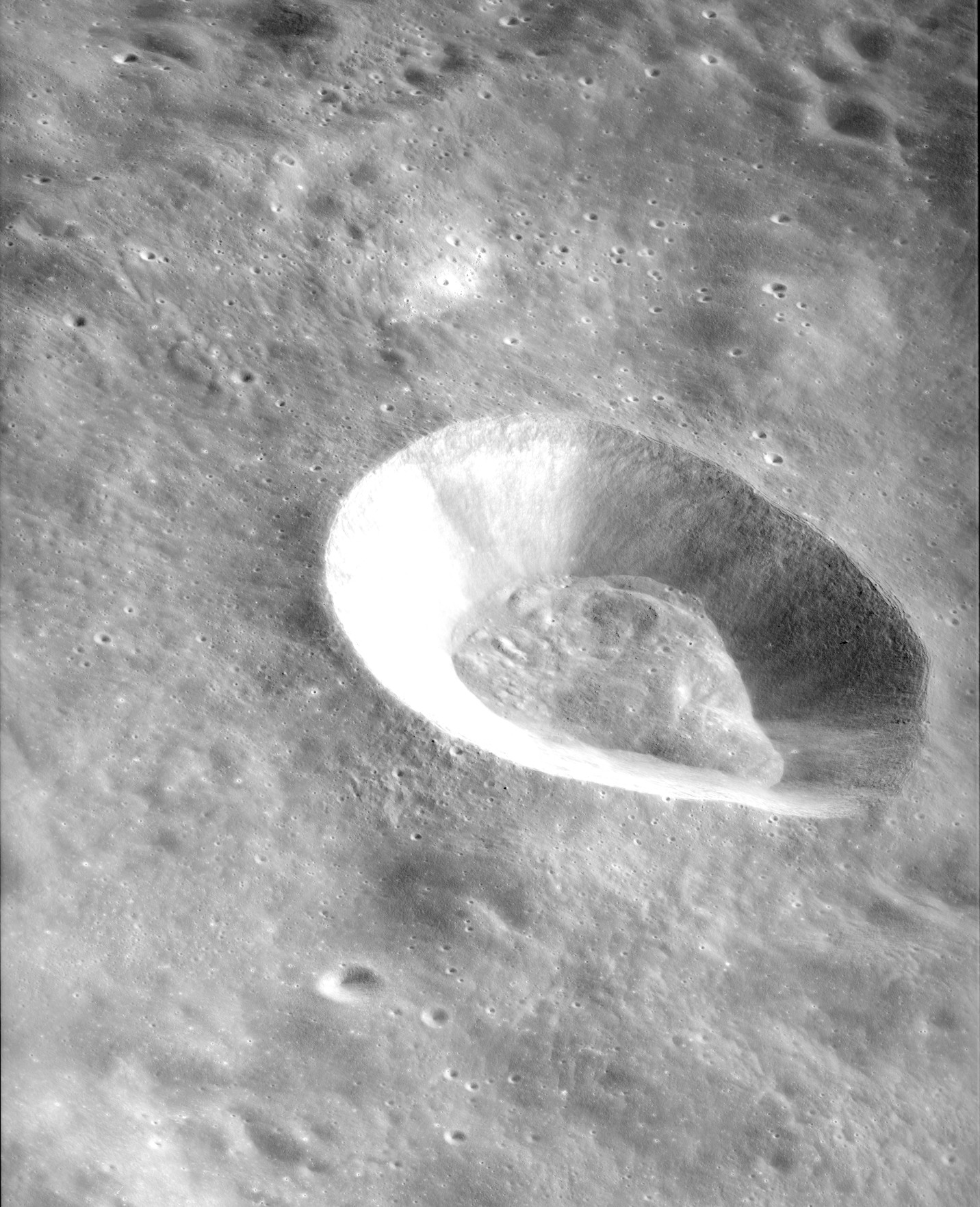
Oblique view of Hecaeteus L (Apollo 15)
