= Project Vista =

1951 American federal classified study

- Location: Vista del Arroyo Hotel, Pasadena, California, U.S.
- Project coordinator: William A. Fowler
- Participants: Robert F. Bacher; Vannevar Bush; Robert F. Christy; James B. Conant; Lee A. DuBridge; William A. Fowler; Charles C. Lauritsen; Robert Oppenheimer; Edward Teller
- Duration: April 1, 1951 – December 1, 1951

Project Vista was a top secret study conducted by prominent physicists, researchers, military officers, and staff at California Institute of Technology from April 1 to December 1, 1951. The project got its name from the Vista del Arroyo Hotel in Pasadena, California, which was selected as the headquarters for the study. The project was originally meant to analyze possible improvements relating to the relationship between ground and tactical air warfare. Initially, Project Vista was not meant to be specific to a certain geographical region, but the focus was quickly set towards Western Europe, as the immediate threat to Europe, United States, and NATO, was the Soviet Union. The report was buried after its release, and was only partially declassified in 1980.

== Background ==
When the Cold War started, the fear of communism was on the rise in the Western world. The Cold War had initiated an arms race between the United States and the Soviet Union which would continue for decades. In 1950, communist North Korea started the Korean War when they invaded South Korea, fueling the fear among western countries of growing communism in the world. Seeing the communist invasion of South Korea, European countries, NATO and especially the United States saw the possibility and feared that the Soviet Union could potentially invade Europe in the near future. At the time, the newly formed NATO was inferior to the Soviet Union, both in terms of conventional arms, aircraft, and personnel in Europe. The only assurance NATO and Europe had against a possible communist invasion was the United States Air Force's Strategic Air Command.

The Strategic Air Command had measures in place to organize a high yield atomic blitz war against Soviet cities and infrastructure, but the current atomic arsenal available consisted of mainly large bombs that had to be transported by special bombers. However, these attacks had to be organized from the United States, and did not guarantee that the Soviet invasion of Europe would stop.

California Institute of Technology (Caltech) nuclear physicist Charles C. Lauritsen toured the Korean battlefields in the fall of 1950, serving as a military advisor on military systems and technology for the United States. Charles C. Lauritsen observed and noted that the United States military needed to improve their tactical air support of ground troops, and upon his return to Caltech he brought his observations to the attention of the Caltech trustees. Charles C. Lauritsen had recently been a part of a summer study conducted at Massachusetts Institute of Technology, focusing on military technology and tactics, and brought up the topic of a potential summer study at Caltech, focusing on his observations made on the battlefields of the Korean War. After President Harry S. Truman made the decision to start a project to build the hydrogen bomb, the Air Force Research and Development Division began informal conversations with Lee A. DuBridge, Charles C. Lauritsen, and Robert F. Bacher about a possible summer study at Caltech.

Lee A. DuBridge, a physicist, and Caltech's first president pushed for the University to take on the summer study, that would eventually address the threat of a Soviet invasion of Europe. Lee A. DuBridge, focusing on the lucrative deal this study would bring the University, while performing a national service in a time where the Soviet Union, and communism were considered the United States' greatest threat, managed to convince the University's trustees and administration to take on the summer study. The project was worth $600,000 over nine months from April 1 to December 1, and was officially approved on April 2, 1951, by the University, though unofficially started a day earlier. Caltech was cleared and ready to take on a broad study of ground and tactical air warfare.

== Role of Caltech ==
The California Institute of Technology was selected for this project based on its expertise in rocketry and nuclear physics. After some deliberation on whether or not Caltech was suitable for the project, Lee A. DuBridge and the rest of the Caltech faculty decided that Caltech was suitable for working on the tactical air problem for ground support. The goal of Vista, from the point of view of the scientists involved, was not to adjust and modify already developed weapons. The goal of Vista was to give advice to the military on the most effective ways that the weapons that were already in the military's possession could be used to combat a Soviet advance into Europe. The project consisted of the joint cooperation of the Army and the Air Force, who did not agree on how to contribute to ground troops. Caltech was brought in as a neutral party to help reconcile the differences between the two parties, which eventually included a participatory role by the Navy. In turn, Caltech saw the importance of the cooperation between the parties involved to help create experimental freedom and avoid bias.

After the project was approved in April 1951, Professor William A. Fowler, a nuclear physicist who studied under Lauristen, was selected to be director of the program. The president of the university at the time, DuBridge, was selected to head the committee for the project. Also, Caltech faculty members staffed the project and a group of scientists brought in take part in the project. At the time, Caltech was an elite institution that took pride in the basic research performed at the university and its capacity for close student and faculty relations. More than a fourth of the full-time faculty members participated in the project. Moreover, the number increases if one takes into account visiting scientists, military liaisons, secretarial, and security staff. In compensation for its participation, the university received about $750,000.

DuBridge used this opportunity for the university to assist the government in matters of national security, to show the loyalty of the university to the United States, and to receive funding. Before Vista came to Caltech, DuBridge spent the majority of first few years trying to enhance the university through the rebuilding of its prevalence in research, expanding areas of study, improvement of infrastructure, and to create a balance between federal funding and traditional methods of earning funding. He was cautious about entering agreements with federal agents to gain funding for the university. The university was searching for ways to improve the university after the neglect during the war period. Dubridge sought ways to increase funding. In the post-war era, Caltech began receiving more federal funding. In 1951, more than half of the university's funding came from government grants and contracts. This led to debates about how the university should handle issues such as earning money for working on classified military projects, the university's contribution to national service, and the issue of having classified projects on campus. All of these issues reappeared with the consideration of participating in Project Vista. After the approval of Caltech for Project Vista, more federal funding was brought in for the university.

Moreover, the increasing Cold War tensions caused a rise in the anti-communist sentiment and fear of communist-friendly members within the Caltech faculty. This led to issues between DuBridge and the very conservative members of Caltech's Board of Trustees. The trustees politic views reflected those of the majority of the student body and alumni. With the continued rise of anti-communist sentiment, especially after Joseph McCarthy fueled the public's fear of communism within the United States, DuBridge began to have issues with people questioning whether there were communists within the faculty at the university. DuBridge saw the university's involvement in Project Vista as a way to insure Caltech's loyalty and patriotism in the fight against Soviet expansionism.

Due to Caltech's experience with rockets in tactical areas, Caltech was specifically selected for this project. Also, with the rising international situation, Vista gave the Caltech faculty members that wanted an opportunity to contribute to the national defense effort. Another reason for Caltech to accept the project was to keep Caltech faculty members from leaving to go other universities to participate in defense programs. However, many Caltech faculty members within physics and aeronautical engineering did not view the crisis as a way to strengthen their programs.

DuBridge also saw financial incentives for the acceptance of Vista. He communicated to the Board that he expected enrollment to drop due to conscription for the war in Korea. He predicted a 25% drop in enrollment, which would cause the university to lose about $150,000 in tuition. The decision to accept Vista would help buffer the blow. Also, Dubridge feared that refusal of the project would cause the government to turn to the private industry, which he feared would cause future detriment to the university system.

After the approval of Project Vista by the trustees, the value of the contract was $600,000. Vista was a large commitment for a university the size of Caltech. The value of the contract was equivalent to the revenue from a $12 million endowment in 1951, which greatly surpassed the amount the university earned in tuition. Before the start of Project Vista, DuBridge thought that only 50 scientists with half from Caltech would be necessary. By the end of the project, over 100 scientist had taken part, including a fourth of Caltech's entire faculty.

== Vista report ==
Over the course of the nine months the study was conducted, fifteen special study groups were formed with a total of over a hundred people, that all contributed to the finished extensive report and appendices that were finally issued. Project Vista was never meant to invent new weapons or systems, but rather look at possible improvements to systems, tactics, communication and procedures. One of the main points for Project Vista was to show how weapons and systems could be used better, and strengthen the United States Air Force's ability to support United States Army troops on the ground during battle. Another point made in Vista by J. Robert Oppenheimer, Vannevar Bush, and James Bryant Conant, was that they recommended NATO, including the United States, to diversify their atomic arsenal, by focusing more on low yield tactical nuclear weapons rather than high yield bombs like the hydrogen bomb.

The atomic blitz war, targeting high population Soviet Union cities was noted as the wrong approach to defend Europe in Project Vista, as it would most likely not stop an ongoing invasion but rather provoke retaliation against European and American cities. Project Vista instead, recommended that NATO should focus on new technology, tactical use of atomic weapons against Soviet troops, which would even the odds in a conventional ground war.

Project Vista, though it made broad recommendation, it did present specific recommendations regarding attack strategies, increase in weapons manufacturing, and cooperation.

Soviet Airfields should be considered the initial target, to offset the difference in air force strength between the Soviet Union and NATO. The major airfields were to be attacked simultaneously, and with great force as soon as Soviet hostility or aggression was shown towards Europe, and a threat seemed imminent. Airfields, supply depots, support centers, and strategic command headquarters were on top of the list of high value targets, while industrial targets were at the bottom. The main objective of these attacks was to stop the Soviet Union from being able to organize a supply line and support, if an invasion were to happen.

The report also called for an increase in weapons manufacturing. A manufacturing increase of nuclear weapons in the range of 1 to 50 kilotons should be initiated. The smaller yield nuclear weapons were advised instead of a weapons in the megaton range, as the emphasis were to be put on deliverability and precision, instead of total destruction. Vista's weapon strategy focused on flexibility in the use of the different weapons, so that NATO could be prepared for any kind of warfare.

Another specific recommendation made in the report was the increase in tactical aircraft, a Tactical Atomic Air Force (TAAF) was proposed for development in Europe, to lessen the dependence on the United States Air Force. Project Vista also urged for joint training exercises between NATO members and allies, in order to ensure the effective execution of commands and tactics in battle.

Recommendations were also made regarding improvements to ordnance, chemical weapons, intelligence operations, psychological warfare, and techniques in communication and electronics used in warfare.

However, the report was clear about its limitations regarding technology and implementation, stating that the NATO air force would have to mainly rely on conventional arms and tactics until 1960. Throughout the report a lot of emphasis is put on the use of atomic weapons against tactical targets, as the United States was superior in the making of nuclear warheads at the time. The broad ranging study concluded that tactical and effective use of atomic weapons could have made the difference between victory and defeat in Europe, should the Soviet Union invade in the period 1951 to 1955.

The report did not specifically challenge the Strategic Air Command's procedures, as the people behind the report did not have access to those files, but the report did make suggestions as to how evolving technology and arsenal should be used in order to offset the differences in military strength between Europe and the Soviet Union.

== Outcome and burial ==
A preliminary draft of the report was presented to military officials and scientists at Caltech in 1951, but was not received well by the United States Air Force, who saw it as sidelining their agenda. The Strategic Air Command wanted to take the fight from the air, targeting densely populated areas; the Strategic Air Command saw the return to conventional ground warfare and smaller tactical bomb drops as heavy critique, especially General Curtis LeMay. The report was rewritten several times, and after discussions with officials from the Army and the Air Force, its final iteration was released in February 1952. Despite guiding discussions, the report still received mixed feedback from high-ranking officials in the military, as well as politicians.

General LeMay, head of the Strategic Air Command strongly opposed Project Vista from the beginning, and was one of its biggest protesters in the report's final stage. The Air Force and General LeMay suppressed the report, as it threatened the Strategic Air Command's agenda, at a time when the Soviet Union had superior military strength in Europe. One of the main reasons the report was buried and kept classified was that General LeMay thought it would undermine his plan of what the Strategic Air Command would become. Project Vista remained classified until 1980, when it became partially declassified.

Although Project Vista's report was buried and its proposals were not formally accepted, NATO's strategy did indeed change after the report was presented. Many of the recommendations made in the report have, since 1952, been incorporated into NATO's military strategy (Elliot 178).

=== Impact in the United States Army ===
Based on the recommendation by Project Vista, the US Army established a Combat Developments Group in July 1953; the group was responsible for studying ways in which the Army might maintain operations in a nuclear environment necessitated by the Cold War. The group was tasked with examining the necessary weapons, doctrine, and tactics for a hypothetical nuclear situation. In the Army's structure, the Combat Developments Group was a special staff section of the similarly new deputy chief of staff for combat developments, within the Army Field Forces.

Shoulder sleeve insignia of the US Army Combat Developments Command

In 1962, the US Army Combat Developments Command (USACDC) was formed to centralize the Army's combat development organizations. The command began working on new weapons, new doctrine, improved Army force structure, and an evolving 5-year plan. A team in the USACDC provided the development of the airmobile force, leading to the reflagging of the 1st Cavalry Division (Airmobile). Another team assisted in the development of the AH-1G Cobra attack helicopter. The command additionally had a cross-functional team (CFT) that contributed to the development of a new main battle tank (later becoming the M1 Abrams).

In 1973, the Army discontinued the USACDC and incorporated it into the new US Army Training and Doctrine Command (TRADOC), a command established in the Operation Steadfast reorganization. TRADOC combined the US Army Combat Developments Command's combat development functions with the US Continental Army Command's service schools and recruiting functions.
