= Charles Lauritsen =

Danish-American physicist (1892–1968)

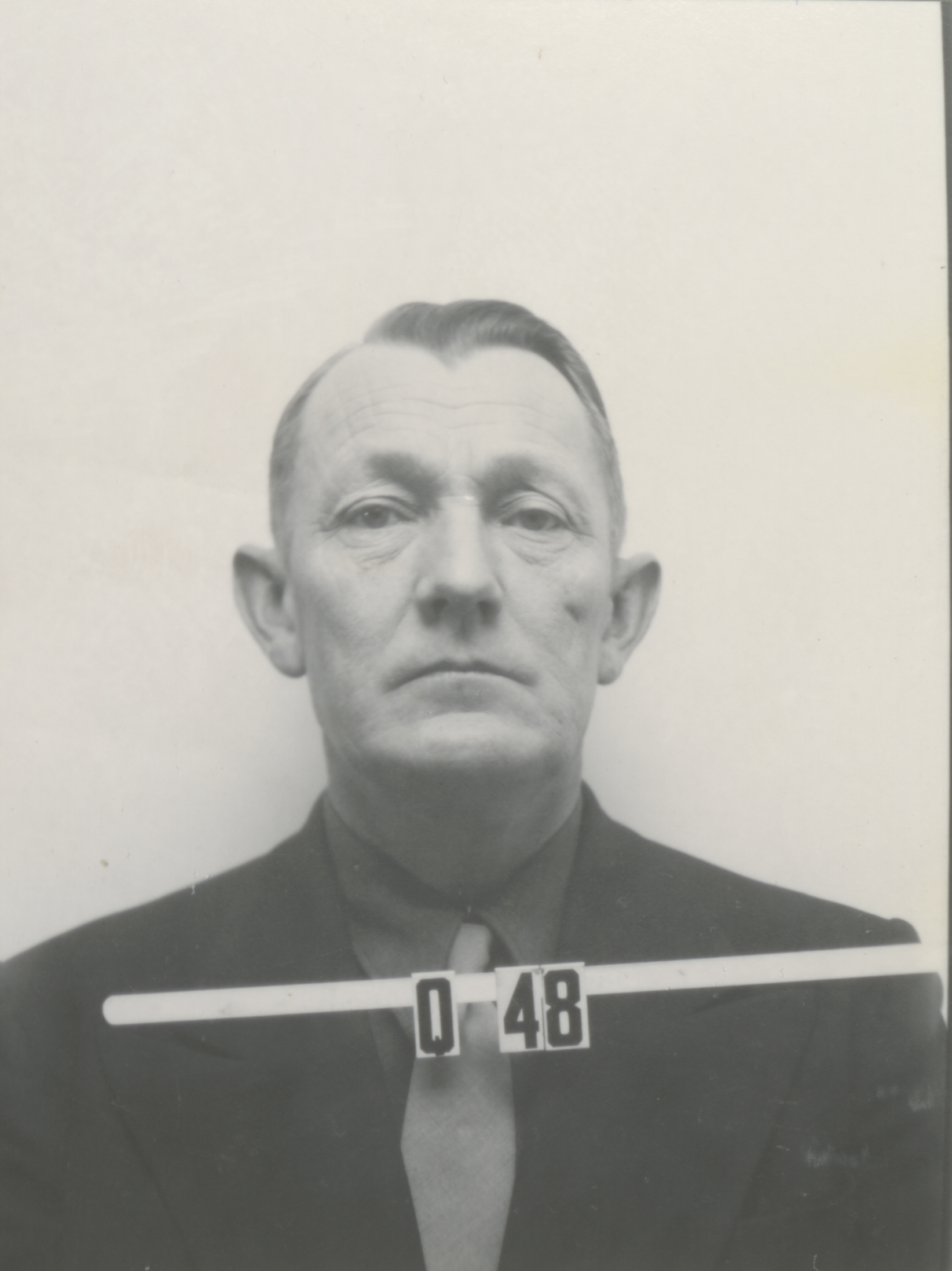
- Lauritsen's Los Alamos badge
- Born: Charles Christian Lauritsen; April 4, 1892; Holstebro, Denmark
- Died: 13 April 1968 (aged 76)
- Education: Odense Tekniske Skole; Caltech (PhD, 1929)
- Known for: X-ray therapy Nuclear physics Pumpkin bomb Quartz fiber dosimeter Millikan–Lauritsen plots
- Children: Physicist Thomas Lauritsen
- Awards: Medal for Merit (1948); Captain Robert Dexter Conrad Award (1958); Tom W. Bonner Prize (1967)
- Scientific career
- Fields: Physics; Nuclear Physics
- Workplaces: Caltech
- Doctoral advisor: Robert A. Millikan
- Doctoral students: H. Richard Crane; William A. Fowler

Charles Christian Lauritsen (April 4, 1892 – April 13, 1968) was a Danish-American physicist.

== Early life and career ==
Lauritsen was born in Holstebro, Denmark and studied architecture at the Odense Tekniske Skole, graduating in 1911. In 1916 he emigrated to the United States with his wife Sigrid Henriksen and son Tommy, first to Florida, where the family lived for a time on a houseboat, and later to Boston, where he worked as a draftsman during the Great War and was a witness to the Boston Molasses Disaster. By 1921, he was working in Palo Alto on radio for communicating between ship and shore. He became interested in the design of radio receivers, and for a few months in 1922 was in business with two partners building radios. By 1923, he had moved to St. Louis where he was chief engineer at the Kennedy Corporation, a producer of consumer radio receivers.

In 1926, Lauritsen attended a public lecture by Robert Millikan who, in casual conversation afterwards, invited him to visit Caltech. Lauritsen and his family soon moved to Pasadena where he talked his way into graduate study in physics. In 1929, he received his PhD, and, in 1930, he joined the physics department faculty. He spent the remainder of his academic career as professor of physics at this institution, finally retiring in 1962.

In 1928, he and Ralph D. Bennett developed X-ray tubes of exceptionally high voltage. These tubes were then used for radiation therapy of cancer patients in the Kellogg Radiation Laboratory, built as a treatment clinic in 1931. Sigrid Lauritsen, who was one of the first female graduates of the University of Southern California medical school, worked in the clinic as a radiologist.

In 1932, he converted one of his X-ray tubes into an accelerator of protons and helium ions and began to study nuclear reactions. In 1934, Lauritsen and H. Richard Crane used a sample of recently discovered deuterium, obtained from G.N. Lewis at Berkeley, to generate neutrons with which they made the first accelerator-produced artificial radioactivity. He later measured the radiation produced when a positron and an electron annihilate each other. One of his most significant discoveries was to show that protons could be captured by a carbon nucleus, releasing gamma rays. This radiative capture process was applied to the study of the nuclear processes at the heart of a star, and the production of the heavier elements. In 1939, the laboratory ceased to do medical therapy and concentrated on nuclear physics. (Lauritsen was director of the laboratory from its inception until he retired in 1962.)

In 1937, he invented a radiation detector called the Lauritsen electroscope, widely used as quartz fiber radiation dosimeters.

== Weapons development ==
In 1940, more than a year before the U.S. entered World War II, Lauritsen began work on weapons and weapons design. His initial work was on the design and development of the proximity fuze, but for most of the war he ran a large program at Caltech that developed and manufactured a variety of rocket weapons, mostly for the Navy. In this connection he helped found the Naval Ordnance Test Station (now The Naval Air Warfare Center, Weapons Division, China Lake, with a laboratory bearing his name) at Inyokern, California. In the last months of the war, he helped in the American efforts to design and build an atomic bomb, including development of the "pumpkin bomb", a high explosive copy of the Fat Man bomb.

He continued his weapons work in the years following the war, and much of his work was classified. In 1960 he became one of the founding trustees of The Aerospace Corporation. Among the projects in which he participated were Project Hartwell, Project Charles, Project Michael, and Project Vista. During the Korean War he was at the front lines just after the Inchon landings observing and evaluating American weaponry for the Defense Department. He served as an adviser to the U.S. government and as a member of many committees and other groups.

After a lengthy struggle with cancer, he died on April 13, 1968, aged 76.

== Awards and honors ==
- Elected to the Royal Danish Academy of Sciences and Letters, 1939.
- Elected to the United States National Academy of Sciences, 1941.
- Appointed Commander of the Order of Dannebrog, 1953, by the King of Denmark.
- Elected to the American Philosophical Society, 1954.
- President of the American Physical Society, 1951.
- Awarded the Tom W. Bonner Prize, 1967.
- Awarded an honorary Doctor of Laws degree by UCLA, 1965.
- The crater Lauritsen on the Moon is named after him.
- Awarded the Medal for Merit by President Harry S. Truman in 1948.

== Sources ==
- William A. Fowler, "Charles Christian Lauritsen", 1969, in NAS Biographical Memoirs
- Charles H. Holbrow, "Charles C. Lauritsen: A Reasonable Man in an Unreasonable World", Physics in Perspective, vol. 5, 419–472, 2003.
- Knud Jakobsen, "Danskeren bag bomben" 2013 (in Danish, catalog entry)
