= Schorr (crater) =

Crater on the Moon

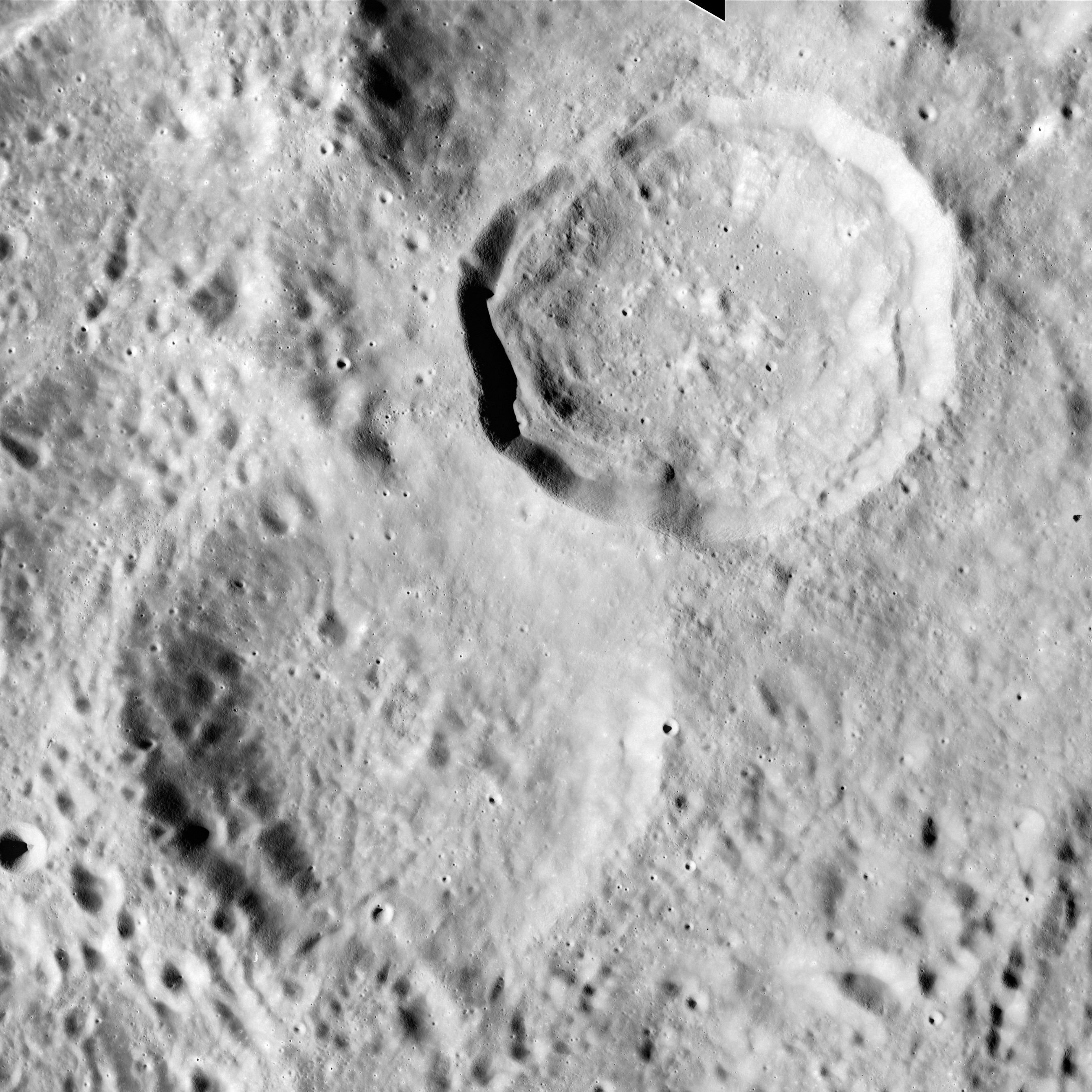
- Schorr (upper right) and Schorr A (lower left), from Apollo 15
- Coordinates: 19.5°S 89.7°E
- Diameter: 53 km
- Depth: 3.7 km
- Colongitude: 271° at sunrise
- Eponym: Richard Schorr

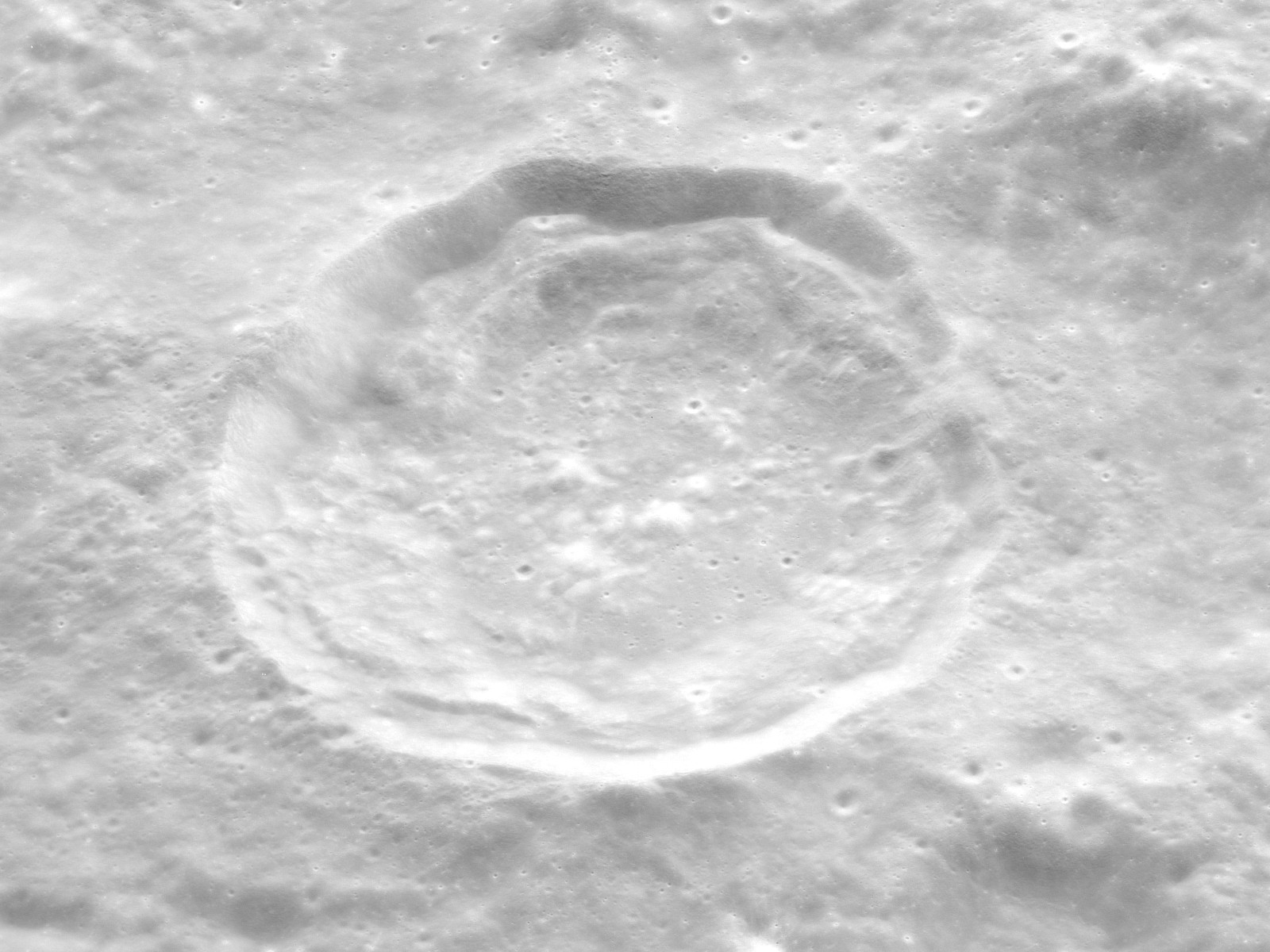
Oblique view from Apollo 17

Schorr is a lunar impact crater that lies across the eastern limb of the Moon. From the Earth this crater is viewed from the side, limiting the amount of detail that can be observed. The visibility of this crater is also affected by libration of the Moon in its orbit. The crater lies just to the northwest of the walled plain called Curie, and to the east-southeast of the crater Gibbs.

This formation dates to the Late Imbrian epoch of the lunar geologic timescale. When viewed from orbit, this appears as a circular crater with an outer rim that has not been significantly worn through impact erosion. The material along the inner walls has accumulated along the bottom of the sloping sides, forming a ledge along parts of the base. The interior floor is irregular in places, with low ridges crossing parts of the bottom. Schorr intrudes slightly into the satellite crater Schorr A to the southeast.

== Satellite craters ==
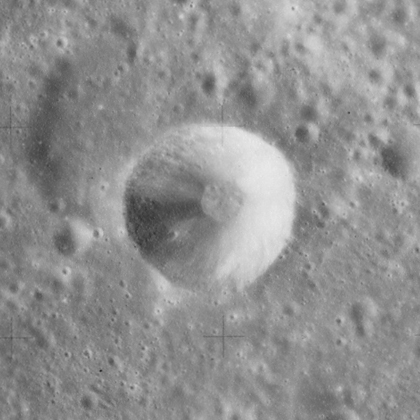
Schorr C from Apollo 15

By convention these features are identified on lunar maps by placing the letter on the side of the crater midpoint that is closest to Schorr.

Schorr	Latitude	Longitude	Diameter
A	20.5° S	88.4° E	64 km
B	16.5° S	88.5° E	26 km
C	13.5° S	88.2° E	13 km
D	18.6° S	91.2° E	21 km

== See also ==
- Asteroid 1235 Schorria
