= Leona Zacharias =

Leona Ruth Hurwitz Zacharias
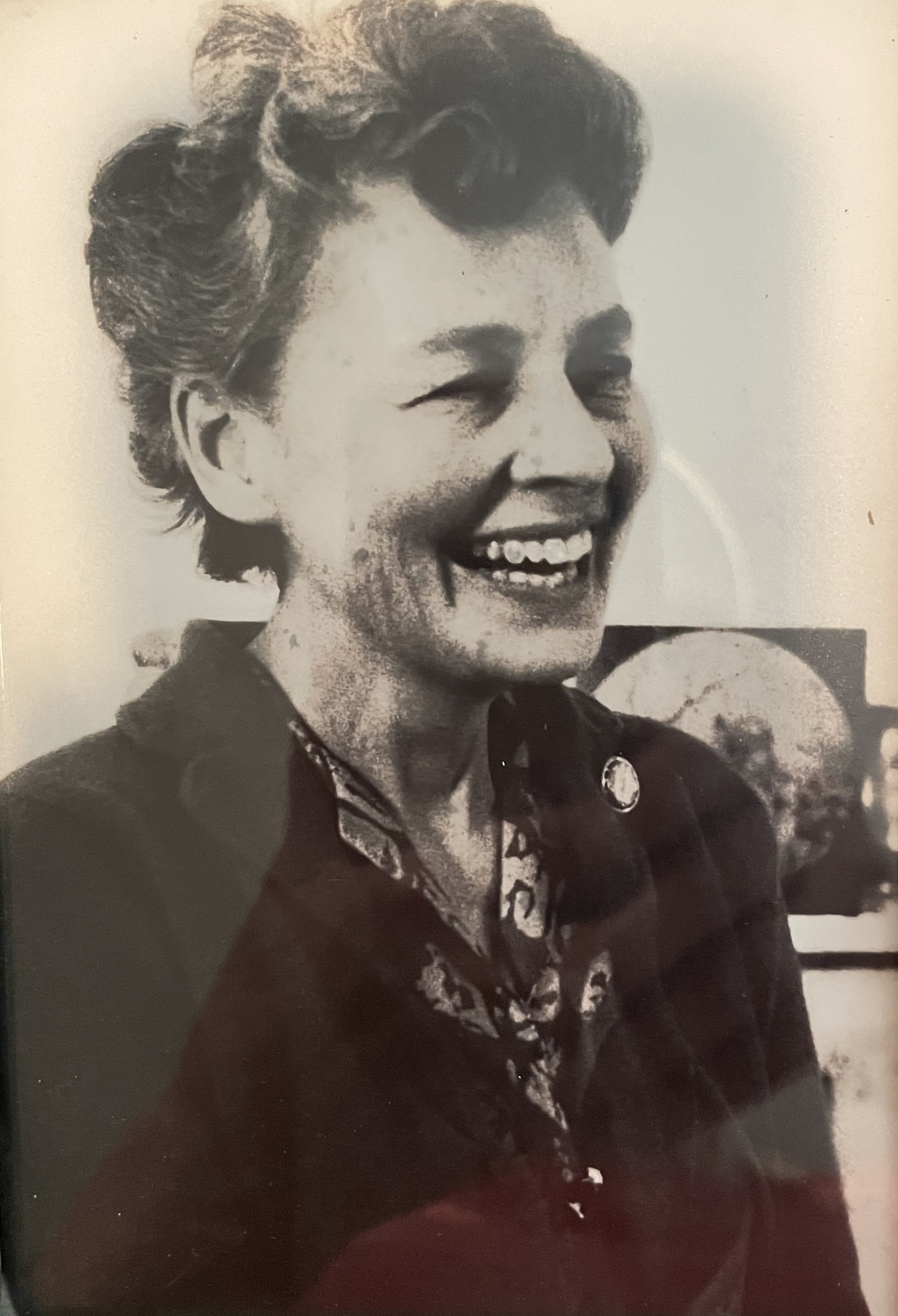
- Born: Leona Ruth Hurwitz; 1907; New York City
- Died: 1990 (aged 82–83)
- Education: Columbia University; Barnard College
- Spouse: Jerrold R. Zacharias (m. 1927, died: 1986)
- Children: Susan Zacharias, Johanna Zacharias
- Scientific career
- Fields: Biology, Anatomy, Optometry, Embryology
- Workplaces: Massachusetts Eye and Ear
- Thesis: An Analysis of cellular proliferation in grafted segments of embryonic spinal cord. (1937)

Leona Ruth Hurwitz Zacharias (1907 – 1990) was an American biologist and medical researcher whose career spanned several prestigious institutions and diverse fields. She’s best known for her part in pioneering research on retrolental fibroplasia (RLF), now known as retinopathy of prematurity (ROP), which causes incurable blindness in the smallest premature infants. Her work was instrumental in identifying the primary causes of ROP, leading to radically improved neonatal care and outcomes. Zacharias also made substantial contributions to the understanding of human maturation, as measured by, the onset of menstruation and its variability in adolescent girls.

== Early life and education ==
Leona Ruth Hurwitz was born in New York City to a middle-class Jewish family with roots in Eastern Europe. Her father worked as a high school mathematics teacher. In 1927, Zacharias graduated from Barnard College, where she majored in Biology. She earned her master’s degree in Zoology from Columbia University in 1928, and went on to pursue her Ph.D. at Columbia University's College of Surgeons and Physicians (P&S). In 1935, Zacharias became an Instructor of Anatomy at P&S and was awarded a research fellowship in Embryology in 1936. In 1938, she received her Ph.D. in anatomy, being the sole woman to achieve this distinction that year. Zacharias’s doctoral research explored cellular proliferation in grafted segments of the embryonic spinal cord and was published in the "Journal of Experimental Zoology."

== Research and career ==
In 1935, Zacharias joined the P&S faculty as an Anatomy Instructor, a position she held for nearly a decade. During this period, she also held other research and teaching positions. She served as a research assistant in the Herpetology Department at the American Museum of Natural History, a research associate at Mount Sinai Hospital, and an Instructor of Embryology at Hunter College.

In 1945, P&S appointed Zacharias to the position of Associate of Optometry. In 1946, she moved to Boston, where she worked at the Massachusetts Eye and Ear Infirmary in various research positions until 1955. Also in 1946, she was appointed Research Associate and Instructor in Ophthalmic Research at Harvard Medical School. This career shift coincided with the emergence of a troubling medical mystery.

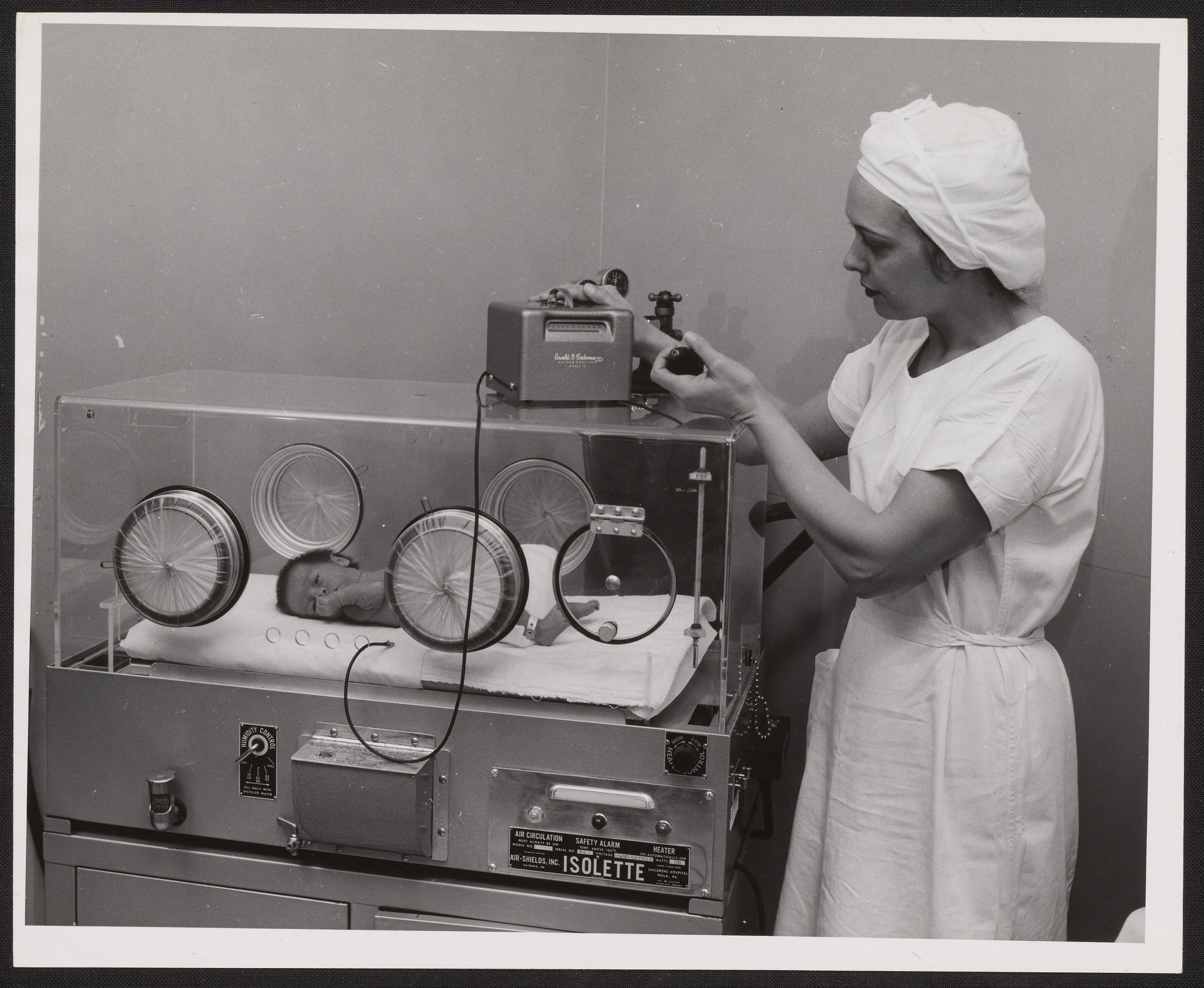
Beckman Model D Oxygen Meter in use with an infant's incubator, 1959

Before the advent of modern medical technologies, many premature infants did not survive due to their underdeveloped organs. However, with the introduction of incubators and other innovations, premature babies were given a better chance. Despite these advancements, a significant and alarming issue arose. In the 1940s, startlingly, many tiny, premature infants were going blind shortly after birth; the cause was unknown.

This phenomenon was initially termed retrolental fibroplasia, which is characterized by the formation of fibrous tissue behind the lens of the eye. In the disease, the normal growth of retinal blood vessels is disrupted, leading to the formation of abnormal and disorganized vessels, which can leak and cause scarring. The scarring pulls on the retina, which can detach from the back of the eye, leading to impaired vision and, in severe cases, complete and irreversible blindness. The first case was documented in 1941 and by the late 1940s, this puzzling disease had escalated into a global epidemic. At least as perplexing, RLF was occurring almost entirely in affluent countries with advanced medical technologies; it was all but unknown in poorer nations lacking sophisticated hospital care for premature babies.

Retinopathy of Prematurity

When Zacharias arrived at Massachusetts Eye and Ear she initially worked alongside Dr. T.L. Terry, a prominent ophthalmologist who first described the disease and associated it with prematurity. After Terry's death in 1946, she joined Dr. V. Everett Kinsey's laboratory, researching the incidence and possible causes of the disease. Together, Kinsey and Zacharias conducted the first survey examining associated causes and complications of RLF/ROP. Their collaborative work resulted in the first comprehensive survey examining the associated causes and complications of retinopathy of prematurity. (Parallel studies, based first in Washington, D.C. and then in Baltimore, under Dr. Arnall Patz, would come to similar and compatible conclusions about the cause of premature infants’ postnatal blindness.)

In 1948, two years after Dr. Terry’s death, a significant paper was published outlining the history and theorizing probable causes of RLF/ROP. This paper, credited solely to Terry, tested various hypotheses about the disease such as birth order, sex of the baby, deficiencies in iron or vitamin A, and oxygen, which was routinely given to premature infants for their developing lungs. Despite her substantial contributions to the paper, Zacharias wasn’t listed as an author, which was edited after Dr. Terry’s death by a committee that included Zacharias.

In 1952, Zacharias summarized and debunked various erroneous hypotheses about the potential causes of the disease. Her work helped lead to the identification of high oxygen levels in incubators as the primary factor by 1955. This discovery was groundbreaking, revealing that the oxygen therapy used to support premature infants’ developing lungs at the same time disrupted blood vessel growth in the retina, leading to retinal detachment and blindness. In 1956, Dr. Kinsey and Dr. Arnall Patz were awarded the Lasker Award for this work. Zacharias’s contributions were not formally recognized.

Beyond her work on RLF/ROP, Zacharias also made significant contributions to the understanding of human maturation. In 1965, she joined the Department of Obstetrics and Gynecology at Harvard University as a research associate and, beginning in 1968, became a principal associate in obstetrics and gynecology at the Harvard Medical School. She was principal investigator of a study on human maturation, focusing on the onset of menarche and its variability. Her research provided crucial insights into the genetic and environmental influences on menarche, and challenged prevailing notions about sexual maturation of girls. Her findings helped lead to the emphasis on the need for personalized approaches to healthcare and education for adolescent girls.

Between 1975 and 1989, Zacharias held various research positions at the Massachusetts Institute of Technology, in the Department of Nutrition and Food Science, the Department of Brain and Cognitive Science, and the Department of Applied Biological Sciences from 1987 to 1989.

== Personal life ==
Zacharias met her husband on a blind date in 1925, and the pair were married on June 23, 1927. Her husband, Jerrold R. Zacharias, was a nuclear physicist who developed the first atomic clock and served on the President’s Science Advisory Committee. On October 14, 1931, Leona Zacharias gave birth to their first child Susan. On August 28, 1942, their second daughter Johanna was born. She loved animals–especially dogs–and owned a succession of poodles. In 2023, Zacharias's story was documented by Katie Hafner in Scientific American.

== Selected publications ==
- Zacharias LR. An analysis of cellular proliferation in grafted segments of embryonic spinal cord. Journal of Experimental Zoology. 1938;78(2):135-157. doi:10.1002/jez.1400780203
- Rosen S, Shelesnyak MC, Zacharias L. Naso-genital relationship II: Pseudopregnancy following extirpation of the sphenopalatine ganglion in the rat. Endocrinology. 1940;27:463.
- Shelesnyak MC, Rosen S, Zacharias L. Naso-genital relationship, III: Some aspects of sexual function in female rats deprived of sphenopalatine ganglia. Proceedings of the Society for Experimental Biology and Medicine. 1940;45:449.
- Zacharias L. Further studies of the vidian ganglion as a source of innervation of the anterior lobe of the hypophysis. Endocrinology. 1942;31:638.
- Oppenheimer BS, Zacharias L. A note on the effect of a vitamin K-like quinone upon experimental renal hypertension in dogs. Journal of the Mount Sinai Hospital, New York. 1947 Sep-Oct;14(3):542. PMID: 20265090.
- Kinsey VE, Zacharias L. Retrolental fibroplasia: incidence in different localities in recent years and a correlation of the incidence with treatment given to the infants. Journal of the American Medical Association. 1949;139(9):572-578.
- Zacharias L, Goldhaber P, Kinsey VE. Vitamin E Deficiency in Chicks I. The Effects of Dietary Supplements on Plasma Tocopherol Levels and Vitamin E Deficiency Symptoms. The Journal of Nutrition. 1950;42(3):359-373.
- Goldhaber P, Zacharias L, Kinsey VE. Vitamin E deficiency in chicks. II. Plasma xanthophyll levels and vitamin E deficiency symptoms. The Journal of Nutrition. 1950;42:453.
- Zacharias L. Retrolental fibroplasia: a survey. American Journal of Ophthalmology. 1952;35(10):1426-1454.
- Zacharias L. Retrolental fibroplasia. 1952 Year Book of Eye, Ear, Nose, and Throat. Chicago: Year Book Publishers.
- Zacharias L. Progress in the study of retrolental fibroplasia. Sight Saving Review. 1953;23:68.
- Zacharias L, Reynolds WE, Chisholm Jr JF, King MJ. The incidence and severity of retrolental fibroplasia in relation to possible causative factors. I. Observations on the occurrence of retrolental fibroplasia. II. Studies of the relationship of retrolental fibroplasia to degree of prematurity, oxygen therapy, general health, and date of birth of premature infants. American Journal of Ophthalmology. 1954;38(3):317-336.
- Zacharias L. Incidence of retrolental fibroplasia. Pediatrics. 1960;25(4):726-727.
- Zacharias L, Chisholm Jr JF, Chapman RB. Visual and ocular damage in retrolental fibroplasia. American Journal of Ophthalmology. 1962;53(2):337-345.
- Zacharias L. Retrolental fibroplasia. Journal of Pediatrics. 1964;64:156.
- Zacharias L, Wurtman RJ. Blindness: its relation to age of menarche. Science. 1964;144(3622):1154-1155. doi:10.1126/science.144.3622.1154.
- Zacharias L, Wurtman RJ. Age at menarche: genetic and environmental influences. New England Journal of Medicine. 1969;280(16):868-875.
- Zacharias L, Wurtman RJ. Blindness and Menarche. Obstetrics & Gynecology. 1969;33(5):603-608.
- Zacharias L, Wurtman RJ, Schatzoff M. Sexual maturation in contemporary American girls. American Journal of Obstetrics and Gynecology. 1970;108(5):833-846. doi:10.1016/0002-9378(70)90552-1.
- Zacharias L, Rand WM, Wurtman RJ. A prospective study of sexual development and growth in American girls: the statistics of menarche. Obstetrical & Gynecological Survey. 1976;31(4):325-337.
- Zacharias L, Rand WM. American Girls: Their Growth and Development. National Elementary Principal. 1978;57(2):29-34.
- L. Zacharias; R. J. Wurtman; M. Schatzoff (1 November 1970). "Sexual maturation in contemporary American girls". American Journal of Obstetrics and Gynecology. 108 (5): 833–846. doi:10.1016/0002-9378(70)90552-1. ISSN 0002-9378. PMID 5471242. Wikidata Q71572836.
- V E KINSEY; L ZACHARIAS (1 February 1949). "Retrolental fibroplasia; incidence in different localities in recent years and a correlation of the incidence with treatment given the infants". Journal of the American Medical Association. 139 (9): 572–578. doi:10.1001/jama.1949.02900260018005. ISSN 0002-9955. PMID 18123547. Wikidata Q80331039.
