= Project Charles =

Project Charles was a U.S. military-coordinated study held at Massachusetts Institute of Technology (MIT), tasked with analyzing the United States' air defense.

An agreement was made between U.S. General Gordon P. Saville, Louis Ridenour, Ivan Getting and John McCone of the U.S. Air Force and designated leaders of MIT, for the formation of the project. Preceding events such as the Korean War and the first detonation of a nuclear device by the then U.S.S.R., during the 29th of August 1949, were possible catalysts and pre-conditions for the military to find it necessary to form the project. Initially a letter contract was issued during January the 30th of 1951, and the two parties entered into contractual obligations during the 6th of August 1951 via Basic Agreement AF18(600)-11. The agreement was formalized as AF19(122)-458 during February 1952, and continued until the 1st day of January 1959.

At its initiation, the task of the project was to address by analysis, the problem of the development of technology to use for an effective air defense of the U.S. The goal of the project was to create a network of computers connected to a command center in order to organize a response to a threat from within U.S. air-space.

The project was active during February 1951, and released its report during the 1st day of August of the same year.

MITRE Corporation assumed the responsibilities identified as the project from January the 1st 1959, and the work developed ultimately into the SAGE project.

== See also ==
- DARPA
- J.C.R. Licklider
