= Gibbs (crater) =

Crater on the Moon

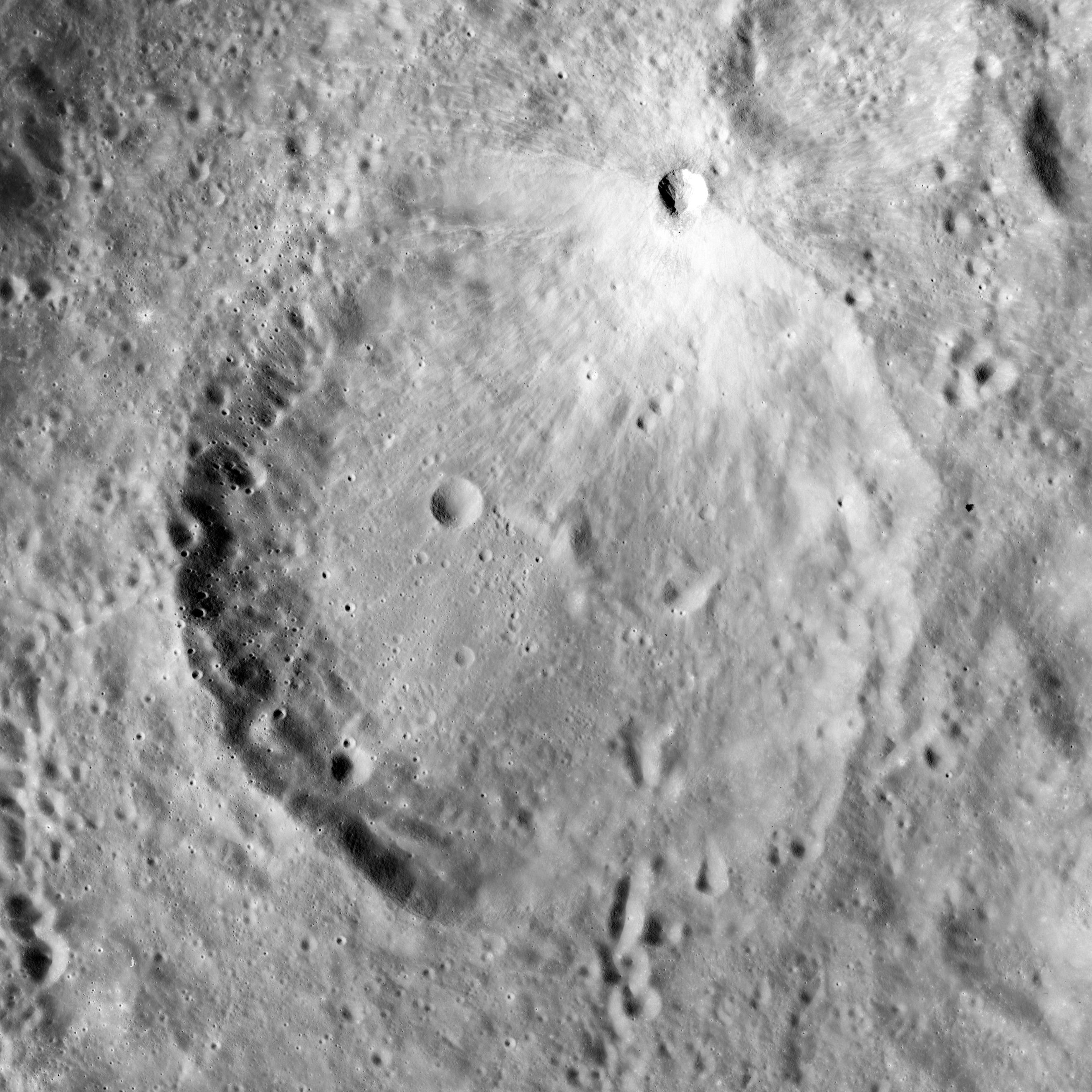
- Apollo 15 image
- Coordinates: 18.37°S 84.27°E
- Diameter: 78.76 km (48.94 mi)
- Depth: Unknown
- Colongitude: 277° at sunrise
- Eponym: Josiah W. Gibbs

Gibbs is a lunar impact crater that lies near the eastern limb of the Moon. It is situated less than a crater diameter to the northeast of the larger crater Hecataeus. The crater chain Catena Humboldt passes to the south of Gibbs, following a line to the northeast. Due to its proximity to the limb, this crater appears foreshortened when viewed from the Earth, and visibility is subject to libration.

== Description ==
The outer rim of Gibbs is not quite circular, and an outward bulge to the north gives it an onion-like profile. The southeastern wall is slightly straightened and there is a low break in the rim at the southern and northern ends. In other respects, however, the rim is only slightly eroded. The interior floor is nearly level in the southwestern half, with irregular ridges to the northeast. There is a small craterlet to the northwest of the midpoint.

== Etymology ==
The crater was named after American physicist Josiah W. Gibbs (1839–1903) by the IAU in 1964. The crater Mirzakhani was named to honor Iranian mathematician Maryam Mirzakhani, in 2024.

== Nearby features ==
A recent small impact along the northeastern rim, Mirzakhani, has produced a small ray system that forms a skirt of higher albedo material across this part of the rim. Faint traces from these rays cover the interior floor of Gibbs. This formation dates to the Copernican period and has a meteoritic iron-rich impact melt. The area around the Mirzakhani impact is characterised by an extremely high rockfall density by lunar standards.

The satellite crater Gibbs D has a diameter of 13 kilometres (8.1 mi) and is located at 13.1° S, 85.9° E.

== Imagery ==
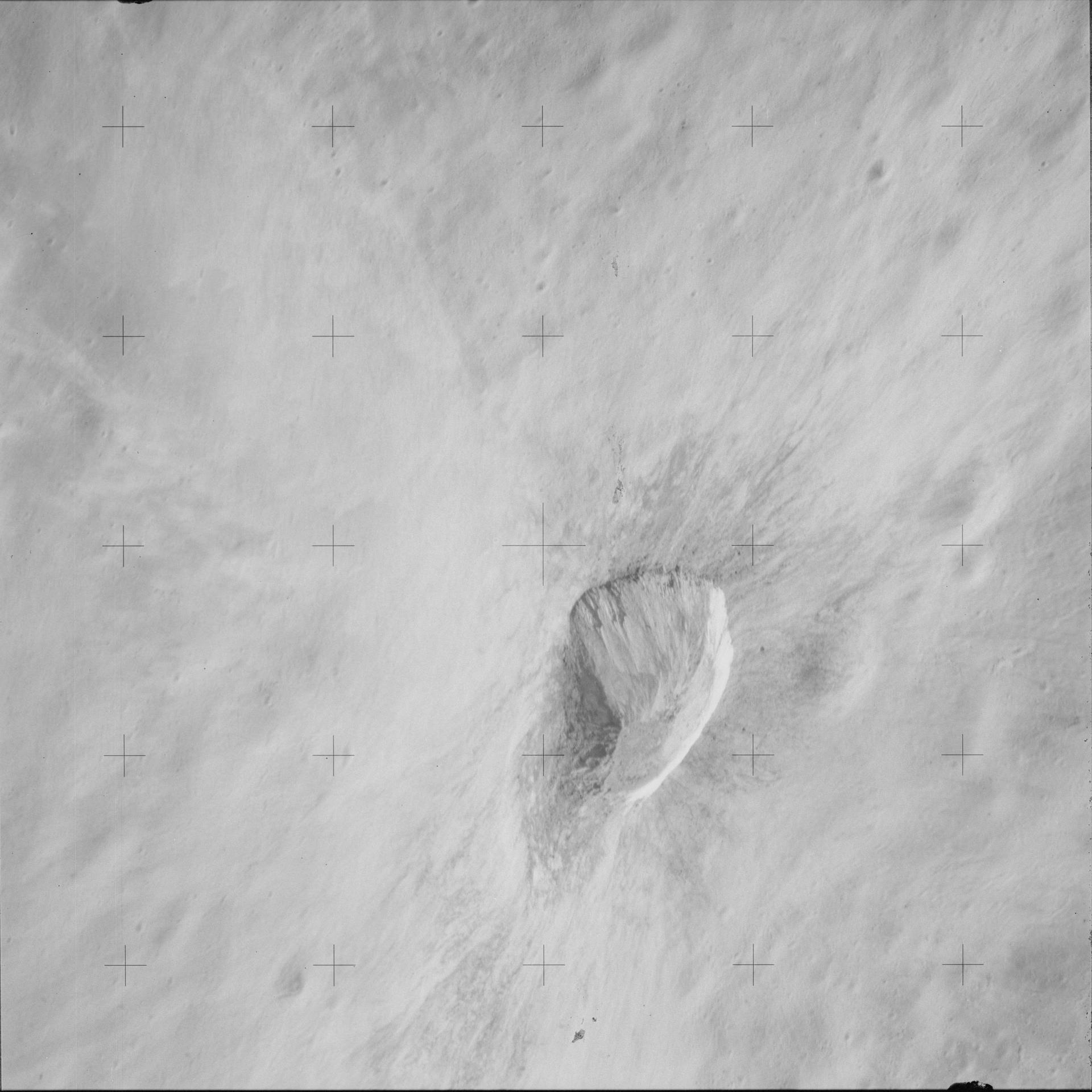
Oblique closeup of the recent small impact on the north rim of Gibbs, from Apollo 15

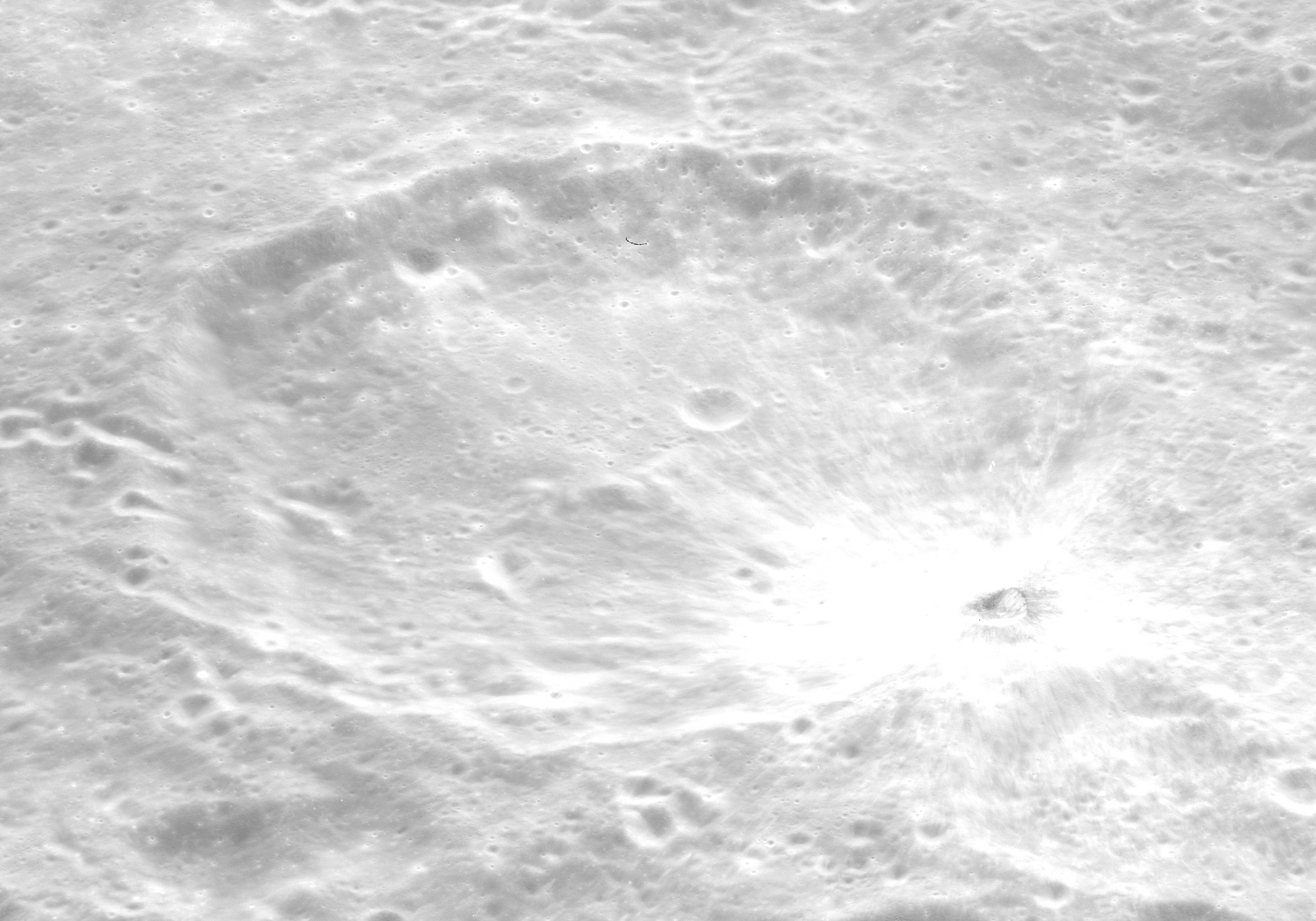
Oblique view from Apollo 17

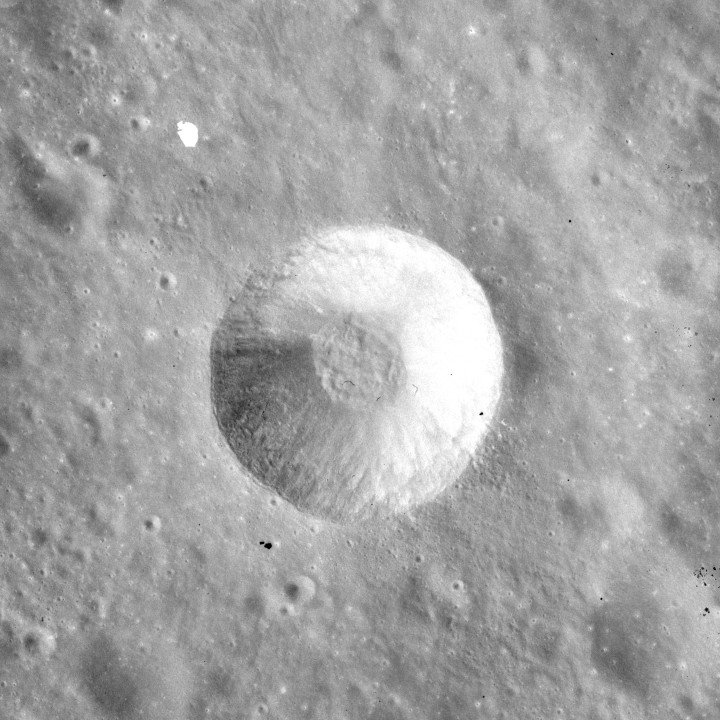
Gibbs D from Apollo 15

== See also ==
- 2937 Gibbs, asteroid
