= Donner (surname) =

Donner is a surname. Notable people with the surname include:

- Aleksander Donner (1948–2013), Ukrainian handball coach
- André Donner, Dutch jurist, former President of the European Court of Justice
- Clive Donner (1926–2010), British film director
- Franziska Donner Austrian wife of Syngman Rhee, first First Lady of the Republic of Korea
- Fred Donner (born 1945), American scholar
- Georg Rafael Donner, 18th-century Austrian sculptor
- Helmut Donner (1941–2026), Austrian high jumper
- Jan Donner, Dutch politician, Minister of Justice
- Jan Hein Donner, Dutch chess grandmaster and writer
- Johan Gustaf af Donner, 18th-century governor of Västerbotten County, Sweden
- Johann Jakob Christian Donner (1799-1875), German philologist and translator
- John G. Donner (1915–1967), Canadian-American politician from Nebraska
- Lauren Shuler Donner, American movie producer
- Margaretha Donner, 18th-century Swedish businesswoman
- Matthäus Donner, 18th-century Austrian sculptor
- Members of the Donner family from Finland
  - Anders Donner Finnish astronomer
  - Henrik Otto Donner (1939–2013), Finnish composer and musician
  - Jörn Donner (1933–2020), Finnish writer and filmmaker
  - Kai Donner, Finnish linguist, ethnographer and politician
  - Olly Donner (1881-1956), Finnish writer
  - Ossian Donner, Finnish industrialist and diplomat
  - Otto Donner, linguist, publisher and politician
  - Patrick Donner, British Member of Parliament
- Piet Hein Donner, Dutch politician
- Ral Donner, American musician
- Richard Donner (1930–2021), American film director
- Robert Donner, American actor
- Steve Donner, American professional sports organizer
- William Donner Roosevelt, philanthropist
- William Donner, American businessman

== Fictional characters ==
- Eric Donner, a character in the role-playing game Scion
- Frankie Donner, a character on the American soap opera Days of our Lives
- General Gerhard Donner, a character in the film Venus Wars
- Larry Donner, a character in the film Throw Momma from the Train
- Lindsay Donner, character on Psi Factor: Chronicles of the Paranormal
- Maddux Donner, a character in the TV series Defying Gravity
- Martin Donner, a character in the Poul Anderson science fiction novella Un-Man
- Maysilee Donner, a character from the dystopian novel and film Sunrise on the Reaping
- Megan Donner, character on CSI: Miami
- Min Donner, a character in the Stephen R. Donaldson science fiction novel A Dark and Hungry God Arises

== See also ==
- Donner (disambiguation)
