= Donner =

Donner may refer to:

== Places ==
- Donner (crater), a lunar crater
- Donner, California, an unincorporated community
- Donner, Louisiana, an unincorporated community
- Donner Lake, a freshwater lake in California
- Donner Memorial State Park, site of the Donner Camp, where the Donner party was trapped by snow
- Donner Pass, a mountain pass in California
- Donner Ski Ranch on Donner Summit, California
- Donner und Blitzen River, a freshwater river in Oregon
- Mount Donner, on Vancouver Island, British Columbia, Canada

== People and animals ==
- Donner (surname)
- Donner family, a renowned and wealthy Finland-Swedish family
- Donner the Reindeer or Donder, one of Santa Claus's reindeer
- Donner woodrush or Luzula subcongesta
- Donner, a character in Artist Descending a Staircase
- Donner, a superheroine in Milestone Media comic books
- Donner, a German name for Thor, a god in Norse mythology

== Other uses ==
- Donner Metals Ltd., a Canadian mining company
- Donner Party, an ill-fated pioneer group bound for California in 1846
- Donner Prize, a Canadian book award
- USS Donner (LSD-20), a United States naval ship
- Donner, a Chinese guitar company
- Donner Block, a wing of William Hulme's Grammar School in northern England
- Donner Laboratory, a laboratory at University of California, Berkeley
- Donner Professor, an academic title of the William H. Donner Foundation

== See also ==
- Donar (disambiguation)
- Doner (disambiguation)
- Palmer v Donner, an 1868 United States Supreme Court case
- Sir Magnus Donners, a character in the A Dance to the Music of Time cycle of novels by Anthony Powell
