= Finland–United Kingdom relations =

- Finland: United Kingdom

Diplomatic mission
- British Embassy, Helsinki: Finnish Embassy, London

Finland's Marshal Mannerheim (right) greets England's General Walter Kirke (left) in Helsinki (1939).

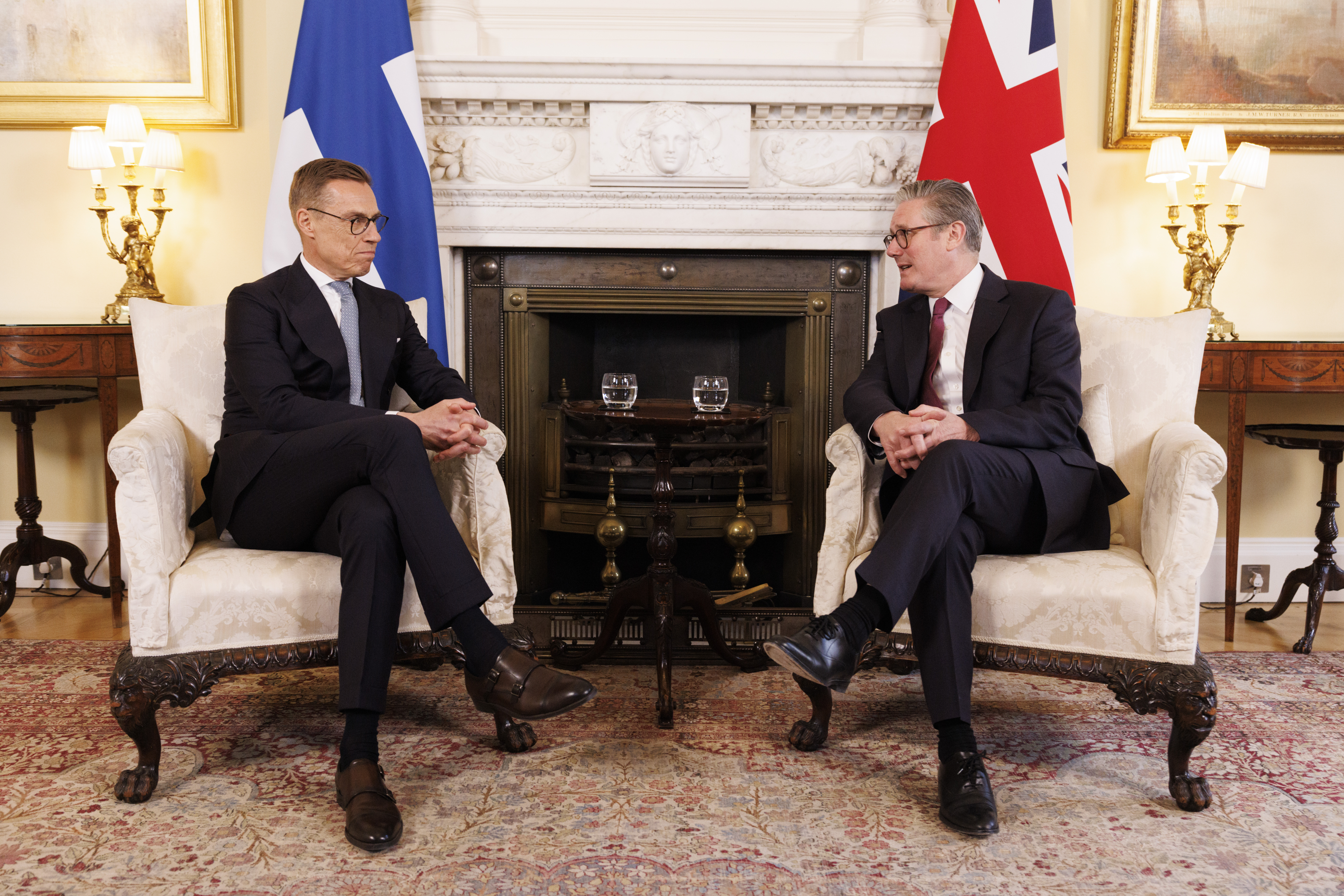
UK Prime Minister Keir Starmer with Finnish President Alexander Stubb in Downing Street, March 2025.

Finland–United Kingdom relations are the bilateral relations between Finland and the United Kingdom.

Both countries share common membership of the Council of Europe, the European Court of Human Rights, the International Criminal Court, the Joint Expeditionary Force, NATO, OECD, and Organization for Security and Co-operation in Europe. Bilaterally the two countries have a mutual defence agreement, and a strategic partnership agreement. The United Kingdom recognised the independence of Finland on 6 May 1919. Diplomatic relations had been established earlier, on 28 March 1918.

== History ==
=== The Kingdom of Sweden 1100-1809 ===
In 1654, Sweden and the Kingdom of England concluded a commercial treaty that guaranteed free trade and shipping between the two countries. The agreement permitted the subjects and inhabitants of both nations to travel safely and freely in each other's territories, engage in trade and commerce without restrictions, and freely import and export goods while paying the customary duties. This treaty was aimed at removing obstacles to navigation and commerce, assuring mutual liberty of trade, and promoting friendly relations based on equal treatment and observance of each nation's laws concerning trade. It was signed on April 11, 1654, in Uppsala.

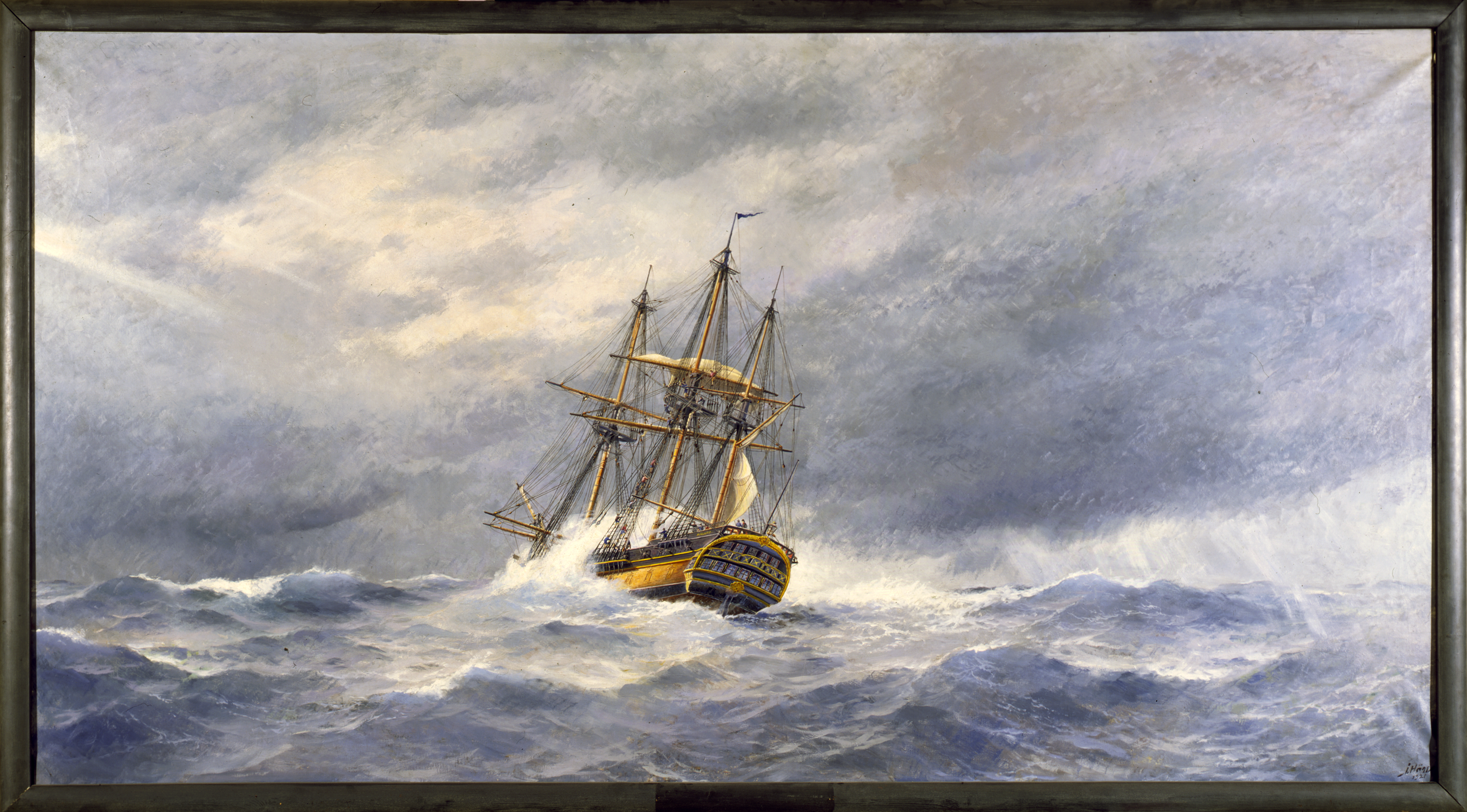
The Swedish East India Company's Finland in a storm on the North Sea.

With the outbreak of the French Revolution and the Napoleonic Wars, relations between Sweden and the United Kingdom grew closer. King Gustav III of Sweden sent the Finnish Baron August Philip Armfelt on an extended visit to Britain in 1790 and 1791. Armfelt's travels came to an end after the assassination of Gustav III.

Navy officer Sidney Smith, who later became an Admiral in the Royal Navy, participated in the second Battle of Svensksund in 1790, serving in the ranks of the Swedish Navy against the Russian fleet.

=== The Grand Duchy of Finland 1809-1917 ===
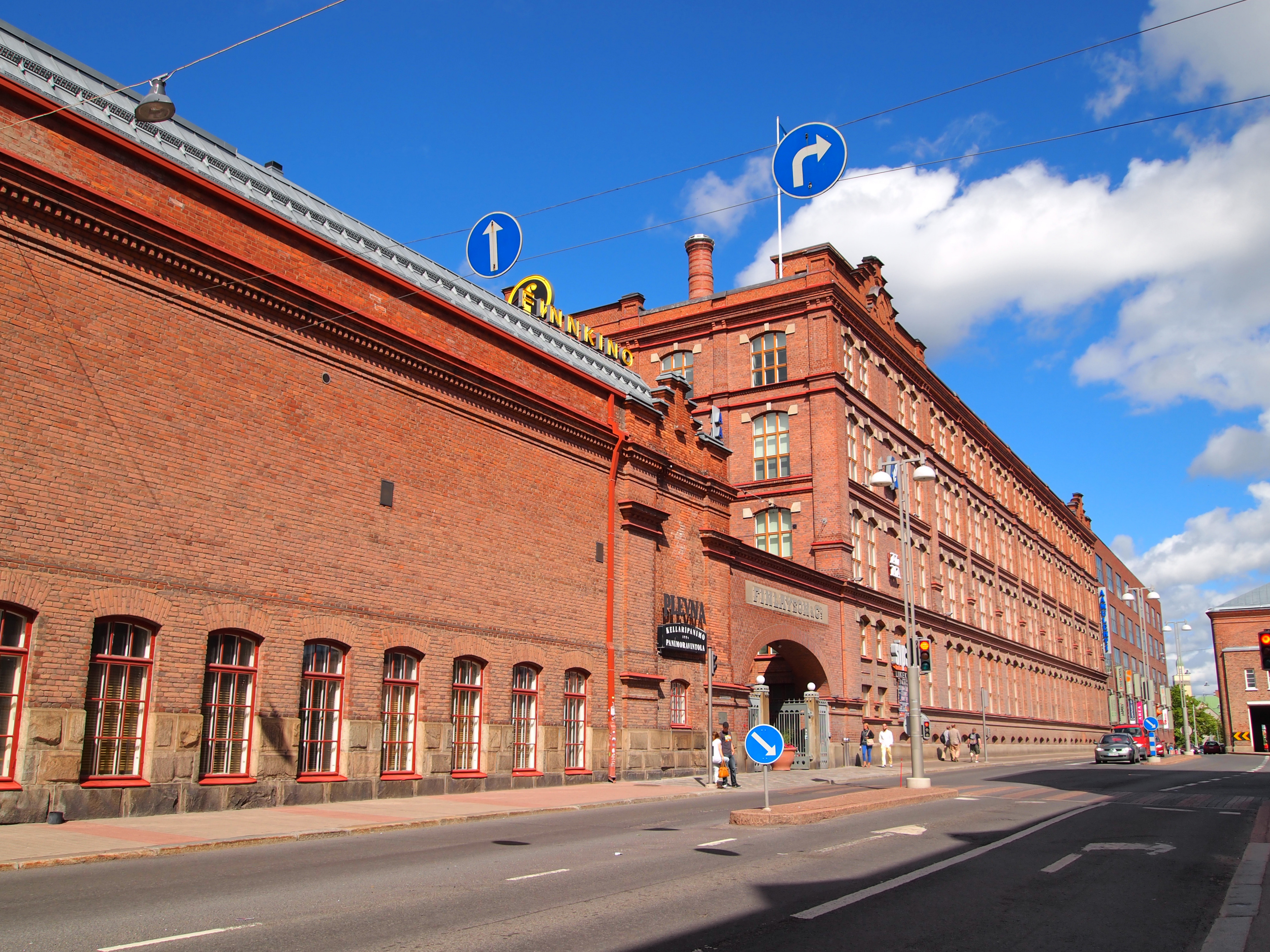
Finlayson's factory. Tampere is "the Manchester of Finland".

James Finlayson, a Scottish-born textile industrialist observed during his visit to Finland that the Tammerkoski rapids in Tampere offered abundant untapped water power. Granted burgher rights by the Emperor Alexander I, Finlayson relocated to Tampere, where in 1820 he established a machine workshop and foundry to manufacture carding and spinning machines. In 1823, he shifted his focus to the textile industry, and from 1828 onwards, the enterprise began to flourish when the mills gained access to imported cotton. Tampere subsequently became home to the largest textile industry in the Nordic countries, Finlayson became the largest company in the Nordics, and Tampere became the leading industrial city in Finland, earning it the nickname “the Manchester of Finland."

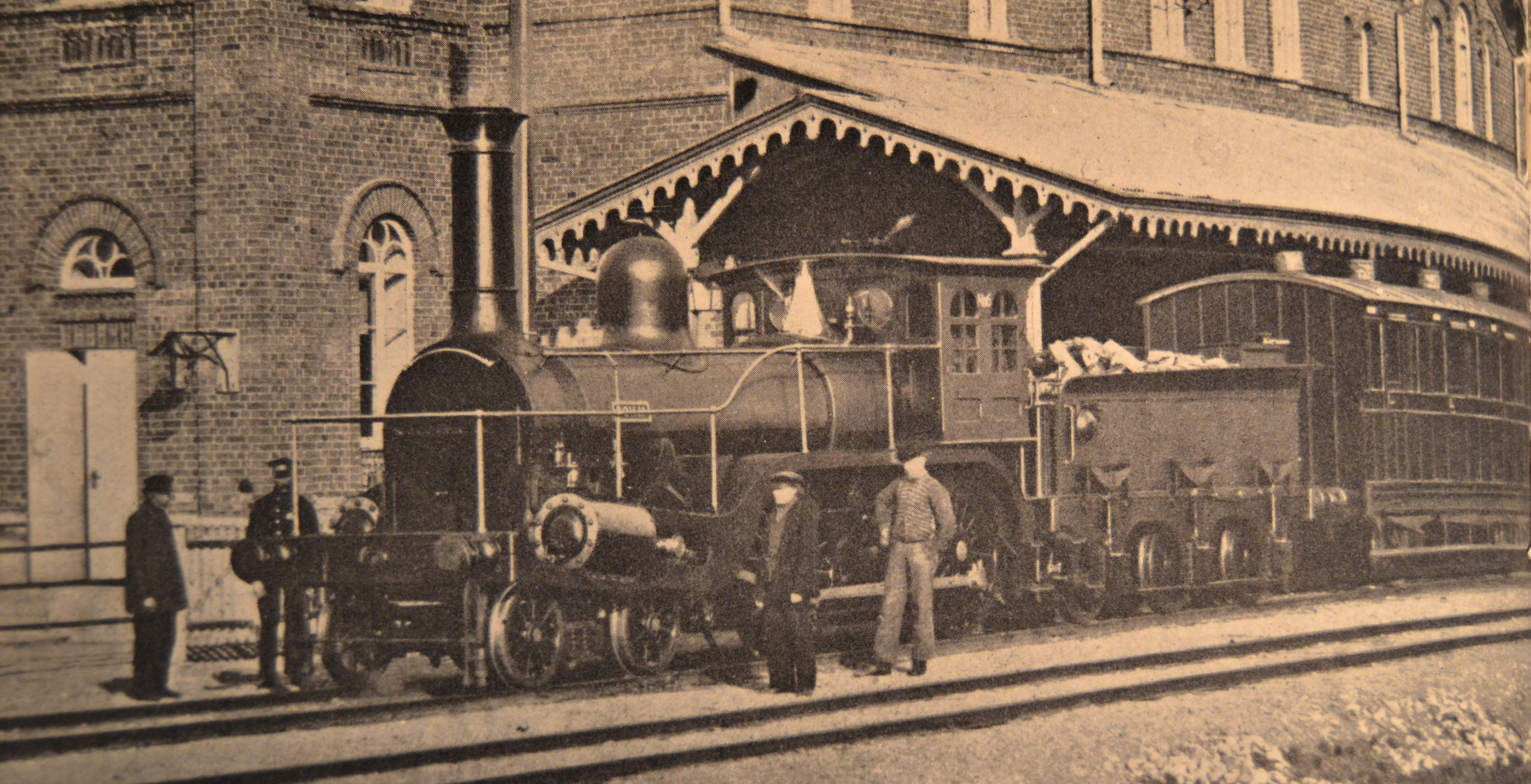
A1 locomotive Pohja at Hämeenlinna railway station, Finland. The oldest photo of railways in Finland.

Count Alexander Armfelt, Finland's long-serving Minister-Secretary of State for Finland, studied at the University of Edinburgh during his youth.

The Finnish Seamen's Mission was established in 1875, following approval from the Imperial Senate of Finland. It was founded to support Finnish sailors abroad, but soon its services were also used by emigrants and other travelers. The first Finnish seamen's pastor was Elis Bergroth, a 25-year-old assistant priest at Porvoo Cathedral, who began his work in April 1880 in Grimsby. Bergroth undertook pastoral journeys to Kingston upon Hull, Liverpool, Goole, and London. The first Finnish Seamen's Church was built in London in 1894, followed by a second one in Hull in 1887.

In the 19th century, the British Empire became Finland's largest export market. Finland later had a commercial representative at the Russian Embassy in London, whose purpose was to monitor economic developments and relay information back to Finland. In Finland, prominent Finnish merchants, industrialists, and shipowners served as the United Kingdom's vice-consuls.

=== The Republic of Finland 1917- ===
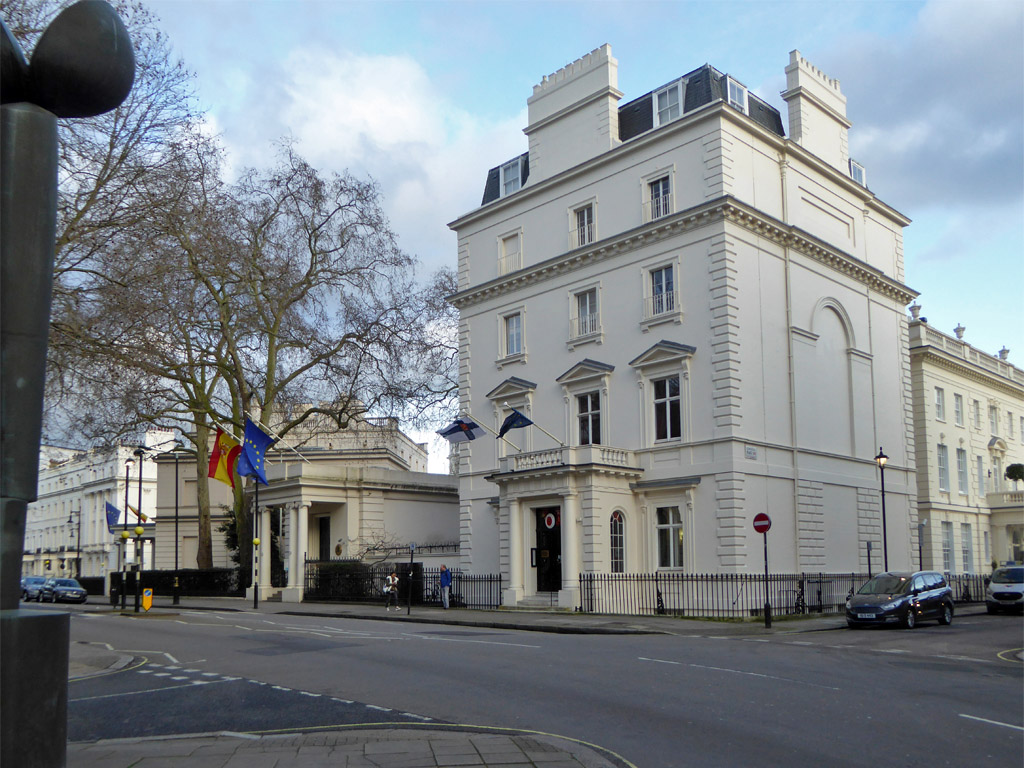
The Embassy of Finland in London.

Rudolf Holsti served as the first official representative of independent Finland in London. During Holsti's tenure, the foundations were laid for Finland's future embassy in London. Ossian Donner served from autumn 1919 as the first ambassador of independent Finland in London.

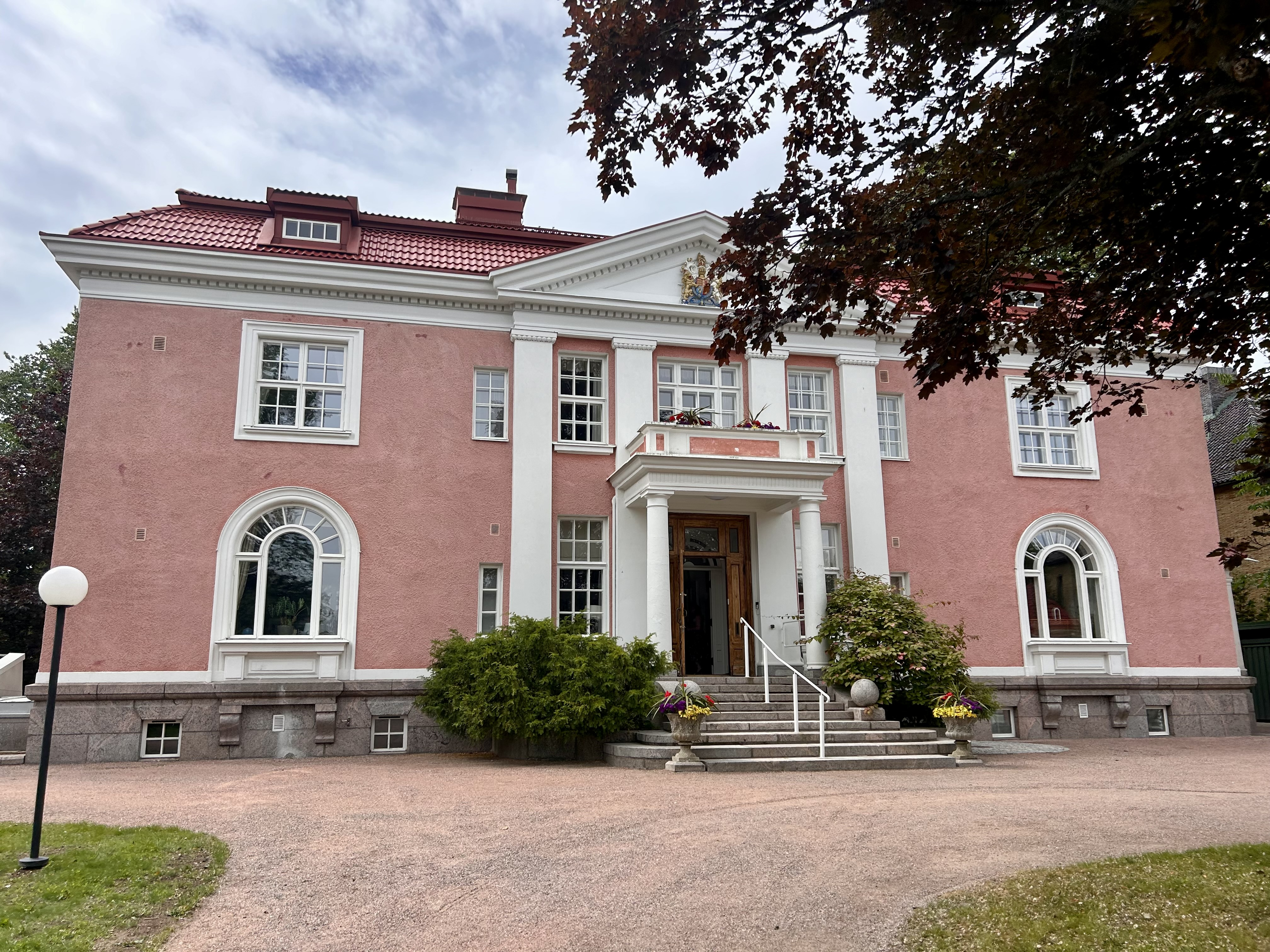
The British Embassy in Helsinki.

The United Kingdom recognised the independence of Finland on 6 May 1919. Diplomatic relations had been established earlier, on 28 March 1918. The British Embassy in Helsinki initially operated in the building of the Svenska Klubben (Swedish Club) in the Kruununhaka district of Helsinki between 1918 and 1926. The British Embassy in Helsinki moved to Kaivopuisto in 1926, where it remains to this day. The embassy is located in a villa designed by Jarl Eklund in 1918.

Finland adopted a policy of neutrality in 1935. Rudolf Holsti returned to the post of Minister for Foreign Affairs in 1936. During Holsti's tenure, Finland moved closer to the United Kingdom and France, a course that displeased Nazi Germany. Holsti's public ridicule of Adolf Hitler led to his resignation from the ministerial post in 1938. He was succeeded by Eljas Erkko, who had previously served as a diplomat at Finland's embassy in London.

Finland sought to form a political union with Sweden, but Nazi Germany and the Soviet Union prevented the establishment of the union. Despite the peace, the Soviet Union continued to pressure Finland. Finland entered into cooperation with Nazi Germany. The Germans were interested in the nickel deposits of Petsamo, which were of crucial importance for armament production. The Lapland War was fought between 1944 and 1945.

President Urho Kekkonen made an official state visit to the United Kingdom in 1961. Kekkonen met Queen Elizabeth II and Prime Minister Harold Macmillan. Kekkonen made a second official state visit in 1969.

Queen Elizabeth II made two official state visits to Finland. The first was in May 1976, hosted by Finnish President Kekkonen. The second visit took place in 1994, hosted by President Martti Ahtisaari. These visits included notable events such as a stroll in a Finnish forest in 1976 and official dinners at the Presidential Palace and the President's summer residence.

Finland became a member of the European Union in 1995. Finland and the United Kingdom frequently found common ground on economic affairs, internal markets, free trade, and security matters.

The United Kingdom also became a popular destination for Finnish university students pursuing their studies abroad.

The Duke of Gloucester, Prince Richard, and the Duchess of Gloucester, Birgitte, visited the University of Helsinki and the Helsinki City Hall in 2012.

Among the members of the British royal family, Prince Philip, Prince Edward, Duke of Kent, Prince Richard, Duchess Birgitte, Prince William, Prince Edward, Duchess, Sophie, and Prince Michael have visited Finland.

On 31 March 2025, the President of the Republic of Finland, Alexander Stubb, undertook a visit to London, aimed at strengthening bilateral relations between Finland and the United Kingdom. During the visit, President Stubb held talks with Prime Minister Keir Starmer, focusing on cooperation between the two countries. Prior to his meeting with the Prime Minister, President Stubb gave an address at the London School of Economics and Political Science (LSE) on global political transformations.

Suzanne Innes-Stubb, the First Lady of the Republic of Finland, was born in England and is a dual British-Finnish citizen. She is the spouse of President Alexander Stubb, who assumed office in March 2024.

== Defence and security ==
Finland joined the European Union in 1995 with the primary goal of fortifying its international position after the Cold War, transitioning from its historical neutrality and non-alignment to active participation in the EU's Common Foreign and Security Policy (CFSP) and Common Security and Defence Policy (CSDP).

Until Brexit, Finland and the United Kingdom actively cooperated in foreign, security, and defence policy within the European Union framework, focusing on adapting to the evolving common policies of the EU and leveraging their membership for national and regional security interests.

The Joint Expeditionary Force (JEF) is a United Kingdom-led multinational military partnership formed for rapid response and expeditionary operations, primarily focused on Northern Europe and the Baltic Sea region. The JEF was officially launched as a NATO initiative at the 2014 NATO Wales Summit when seven countries - Denmark, Estonia, Latvia, Lithuania, the Netherlands, Norway, and the United Kingdom - signed a foundational Letter of Intent to establish the force. Finland joined the JEF in the summer of 2017 alongside Sweden, expanding the membership to nine nations. In 2021, Iceland became the tenth member.

Since 2022, Finland, along with Sweden, is in a mutual defence treaty with the United Kingdom. In 2022, British Prime Minister Boris Johnson arrived in Finland and granted Finland security assurances for the duration of its NATO membership process. In July 2022, the United Kingdom fully approved Finland's application for NATO membership.

== Strategic partnership ==
The Joint Declaration on the Strategic Partnership between the United Kingdom of Great Britain and Northern Ireland and the Republic of Finland, signed on 20 May 2024, establishes a framework to strengthen bilateral cooperation based on shared democratic values and historic ties. The declaration emphasizes collaboration within multilateral organisations such as NATO, the United Nations, and the European Political Community, reinforcing a commitment to a rules-based international order.

The partnership prioritizes joint support for Ukraine in response to Russia’s aggression, including military aid, economic assistance, and efforts to counter hybrid threats such as disinformation and cyberattacks. Security and defence cooperation is enhanced through NATO membership, the Joint Expeditionary Force, and collaboration on cyber defence, defence innovation, and intelligence sharing, focusing on the security of Northern Europe, the Arctic, and the Baltic Sea region.

Economic cooperation seeks to promote open trade and investment, focusing on emerging technologies including artificial intelligence, 6G communications, quantum computing, and critical minerals. The two countries coordinate on migration management, targeting irregular migration and organised crime through joint EU–UK efforts.

In environmental matters, the declaration commits to climate action aligned with the Paris Agreement, promoting renewable energy, biodiversity, and sustainable forest management, alongside collaboration on nuclear technologies such as Small Modular Reactors. Education, science, research, and innovation cooperation are also prioritized, with attention to academic exchange, research security, and intellectual property rights.

The declaration underscores fostering people-to-people links through enhanced mobility, cultural exchange, and cooperation in civil and family law. Governance of the partnership includes annual ministerial meetings and expert consultations, with the declaration expressing a political commitment that does not create legal obligations under international law.

== Culture ==
Finnish merchant John von Julin founded Finland's first school in 1822 that used the Bell–Lancaster method. Professor Johan Henrik Avellan wrote Finland's first doctoral dissertation on the same teaching method in 1828.

William Shakespeare’s plays were an important part of theatrical programming in Finland during the 19th century, especially under the direction of Kaarlo Bergbom at the Finnish Theatre. During Bergbom's tenure, a total of 14 of Shakespeare's plays were staged, amounting to nearly half of his total output of 36 plays. Historical dramas in particular, such as Julius Caesar, attracted great attention and were revived well into the early 20th century. These productions featured crowd scenes that were impressive and visually striking, inspired by the Meiningen Court Theatre in Germany.

The Tempest premiered in Finnish only in the early 20th century, though it had been performed in a somewhat adapted form in the late 19th century. Other well-known Shakespeare works included Hamlet and Mary Stuart (the latter being a play by Friedrich Schiller, yet a classic of the same era). Shakespeare's plays were significant elements in the development of Finnish theatre and strengthened the theatre's role in building national culture.

In the late 19th century, a brothel named London operated in Helsinki and was well known.

British popular culture arrived in Finland in the early 1900s. Finland's first film screening was held in June 1896, less than half a year after the Lumière brothers had introduced their invention in Paris. Films became a common pastime for the public in the 1910s. Most of the films were imported from Britain, the United States, and the Nordic countries.

Composer Jean Sibelius had a significant connection with England, primarily through his visits and the reception of his music there. He first visited Britain in 1905, mainly to conduct his works. His longest stay was in London in 1909, where he lived for several weeks at 15 Gloucester Walk in Holland Park. During this time, he composed his only published string quartet, Voces Intimae. Sibelius was admired in Britain by notable figures such as the composer Granville Bantock and conductor Henry Wood.

A blue plaque commemorating Jean Sibelius was erected in 1995 by English Heritage at 15 Gloucester Walk, Holland Park, London W8 4HZ, in the Royal Borough of Kensington and Chelsea.

J.R.R. Tolkien was profoundly influenced by the Finnish language, Finland, and the Finnish national epic Kalevala in shaping his legendarium and invented languages. Tolkien admired the Finnish language for its phonetic beauty and structure, describing it as a "complete wine-cellar filled with bottles of an amazing wine" that intoxicated him.

The Beatles’ music was received in Finland with enthusiasm and speed; Finland was among the earliest countries where Beatlemania and the band's records gained popularity already in the autumn of 1963, before the United States. The Beatles craze was visible among youth in fashion, fan culture, and chart success, and the band's songs inspired wide attention and imitation in Finnish popular culture.

Finland's cultural life has been influenced by British-origin figures such as Kim Brown, Raymond Ebanks, Richard Hall, Neil Hardwick, Herbert Lomas, William Markus, Paul Oxley, Frank Robson, Phyllis Sjöström, Ronya Stanley, and Kristiina Wheeler.

Among Finnish designers, the Honorary Royal Designer for Industry title has been awarded to Alvar Aalto, Yrjö Kukkapuro, Antti Nurmesniemi, Vuokko Nurmesniemi, Timo Sarpaneva, and Ilmari Tapiovaara.

In 2011, a memorial plaque for Professor Edward Westermarck was unveiled in London on Thursday, 15 December. The plaque was affixed to the outer wall of the University of London’s main building, Senate House.

In March 2017, the Finnish-British art history professor Tancred Borenius received a blue plaque in the Royal Borough of Kensington and Chelsea.

Esa-Pekka Salonen served as an artistic advisor, and the chief conductor of the London Philharmonia Orchestra from 2008 to 2021.

British movies in Finland have a notable popularity. In 2024, British films accounted for 21 of the premieres in Finland, showing a solid presence in the market. British movies are regularly part of cinema offerings and streaming platforms like Netflix in Finland, with audiences appreciating British film styles, drama, and storytelling. English-language pop and rock - often including British artists - are popular among Finnish listeners. British pop and rock have strong cultural influence, especially among younger Finns interested in international music scenes.

The majority of Finns possess a strong command of the English language, with approximately 70% of the population able to speak English at a conversational level or higher, according to the most recent data from 2025. This figure equates to nearly 3.9 million people in Finland, making English the most widely spoken foreign language in the country. Less than 0.5% of Finns are native English speakers, but the language is highly integrated into public life and the education system.

== Trade ==
Prince Michael of Kent visited Finland in 2017 and 2022. During his visits, he promoted trade and investment between the United Kingdom and Finland.

== Diplomatic missions ==
- Embassy of Finland in London.
- United Kingdom has an embassy in Helsinki.

== Transport ==
Both countries belong to European route E16 and European route E18. Finnlines operates a freight service from Finland to UK.

== See also ==
- Foreign relations of Finland
- Foreign relations of the United Kingdom
