= Jeanette Bonnier =

Swedish media proprietor, journalist, and author

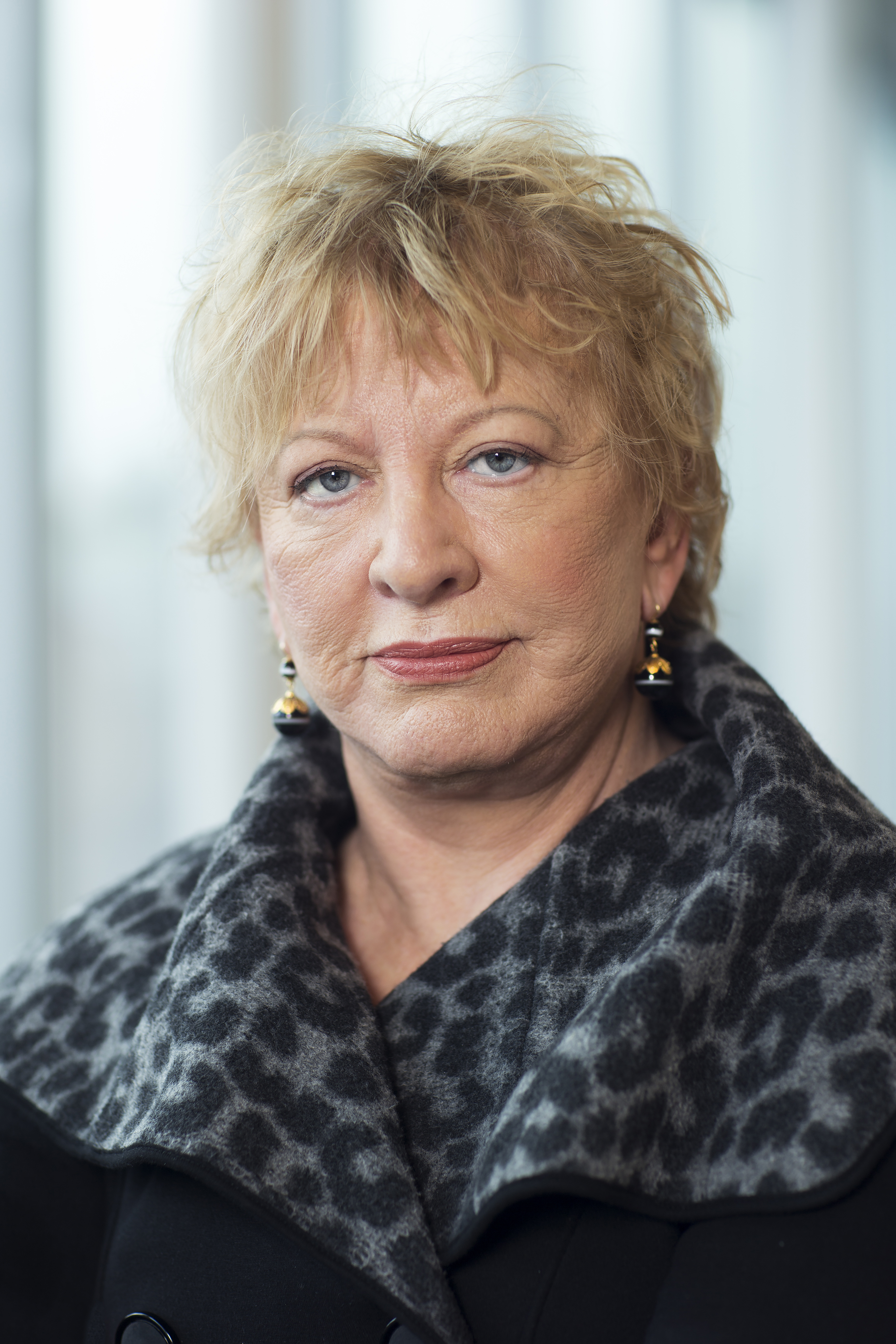
Jeanette Bonnier in 2013

Johanna Margaret Jeanette Bonnier (23 January 1934 – 16 April 2016) was a Swedish media proprietor, journalist, and author. She was the daughter of publisher Albert Bonnier Jr. and Birgit Flodquist, the sister of Charlotte Bonnier, and the holder of one of the largest stakes of the Bonnier Group.

== Biography ==
Jeanette Bonnier was the daughter of Albert Bonnier Jr. and Birgit Flodquist as well as sister of Charlotte Bonnier and half -sister to Joakim Santesson. Her grandfather was Tor Bonnier and Grandpa Lars Flodquist. Bonnier started working early on the Bonnier companies. Among other things, she worked at Åhlén & Åkerlund's ad department. She became a general reporter at Expressen in 1952 and was also a reporter at Bildjournalen, Weekly Journal and Filmjournalen. She was head of fashion magazine Eva - Bonnier's monthly magazine. In the late 1960s, she moved to New York and was the head of the Bonniers Ink department store. And gallerist with Jan Eric Löwenadler. She also lived in Portugal for a few years.

She married three times: the first time 1958–1961 with doctor Bengt Thomasson (1924–2001) and the second time 1964–1970 with director Hans Dahlin. She was then a partner in New York with actor Kevin McCarthy. She was married third time in 1974–1988 with Finnish writer, film director Jörn Donner.
