= Embassy of Finland, London =

Embassy of Finland in London
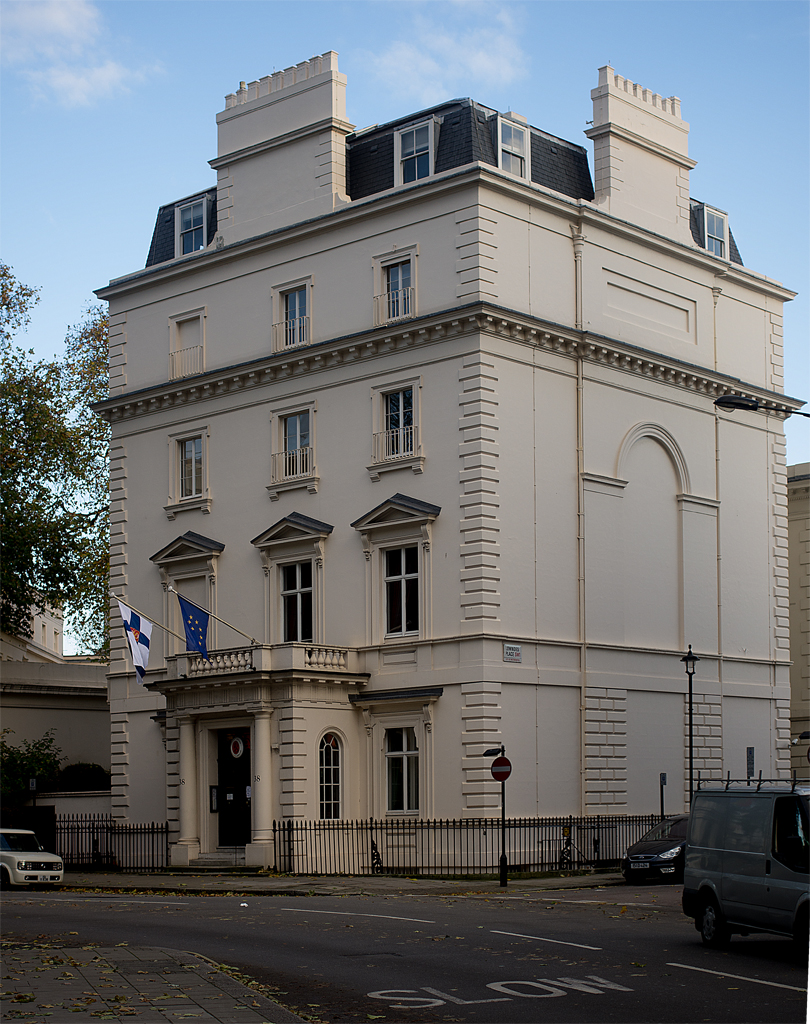
- Location: Belgravia, London
- Address: 38 Chesham Place, London, SW1X 8HW
- Coordinates: 51°29′51.3″N 0°9′15.3″W
- Ambassador: Teemu Turunen

The Embassy of Finland in London is the diplomatic mission of Finland in the United Kingdom.

It is located in Belgravia, 38 Chesham Place. Belgravia is known to be a home for many embassies.

The Grade II listed building was built by Thomas Cubitt in the 1830s and had many occupants until it became the Finnish embassy in 1975.

The ambassador of Finland to the United Kingdom, since 2025, is Teemu Turunen moved to London from the position of Deputy Director of the Finnish Security Intelligence Service. Previously, he has served as Peace Mediation Ambassador (2020–2021), Head of the Buenos Aires Mission (2016–2019), and Head of the Consular Unit at the Ministry for Foreign Affairs (2012–2016).

The Ambassador’s Residence is in 14 Kensington Palace Gardens.

== Ambassadors ==
Representative	Years	Status
Rudolf Holsti	1918–1919	Representative
Ossian Donner	1919–1926	Minister
Armas Saastamoinen	1926–1932	Minister
G. A. Gripenberg	1933–1942	Minister
Eero A. Wuori	1945–1947	Representative
Eero A. Wuori	1947–1952	Minister
Ernst Soravuo	1952–1955	Minister
Sakari Tuomioja	1955–1957	Ambassador
Leo Tuominen	1957–1968	Ambassador
Otso Wartiovaara	1968–1974	Ambassador
Richard Tötterman	1975–1983	Ambassador
Ilkka Pastinen	1983–1991	Ambassador
Leif Blomqvist	1991–1997	Ambassador
Pertti Salolainen	1996–2004	Ambassador
Jaakko Laajava	2005–2010	Ambassador
Pekka Huhtaniemi	2010 – 2015	Ambassador
Päivi Luostarinen	2015 - 2019	Ambassador
Markku Keinänen	2019 – 2021	Ambassador
Jukka Siukosaari	2021 – 2025	Ambassador
Teemu Turunen	2025-	Ambassador

== Gallery ==
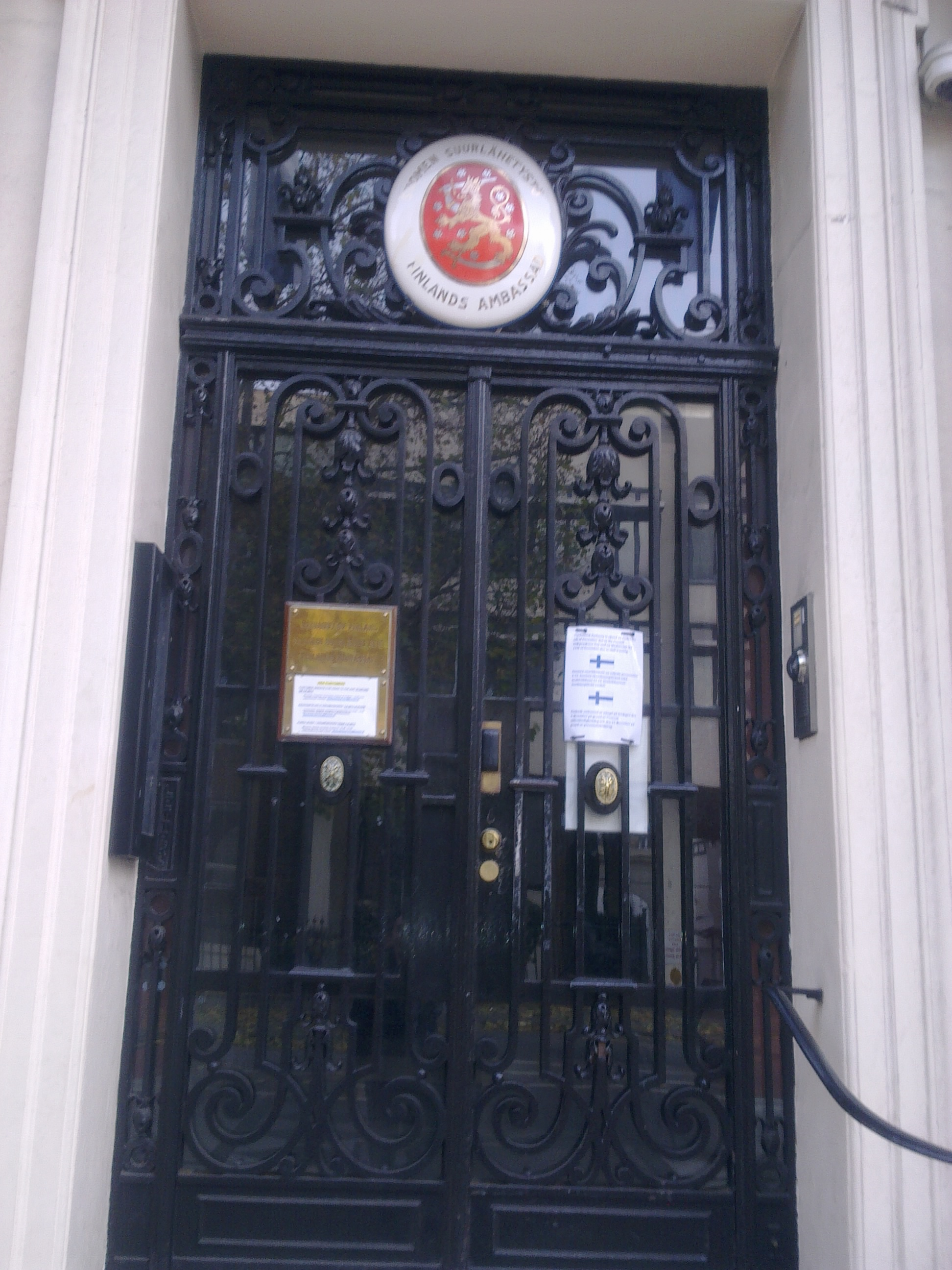
The entrance to the embassy depicting the Coat of arms of Finland

== See also ==
- Finland–United Kingdom relations
