= Tancred Borenius =

Finnish art historian (1885–1948)

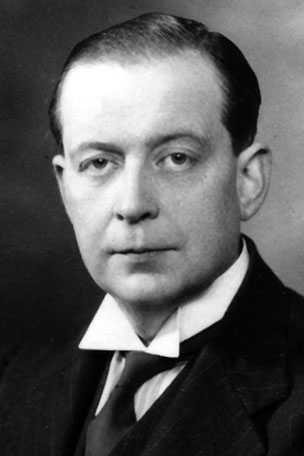
- Tancred Borenius
- Born: July 14, 1885; Vyborg, Grand Duchy of Finland
- Died: September 2, 1948 (aged 63); Coombe Bisset, England
- Education: University of Helsinki
- Occupations: Art historian, diplomat
- Spouse: Anne-Marie Runeberg
- Children: Peter Borenius
- Parent(s): Carl Borenius & Olga Borenius

Carl Tancred Borenius (14 July 1885, Vyborg – 2 September 1948, Coombe Bisset) was a Finnish art historian working in England, who became the first professor of the history of art at University College London. He was a prolific author, and recognised as one of the world's leading experts on Italian art of the early Renaissance.

Borenius also served as a diplomat liaising between Finland and Britain. It has been argued that during World War II he worked as a spy for the British MI6, and was instrumental in enticing Rudolf Hess to fly to Britain in 1941.

== Career ==
Borenius was the son of Finnish businessman and politician Carl Borenius. He studied at Helsinki and in Italy. He received his Ph.D. from Helsinki University in 1909, after which he moved to London. His first book was a version of his doctoral dissertation, Painters of Vincenza (1909). He married Anne-Marie Runeberg, a granddaughter of the Finnish poet Johan Ludvig Runeberg.

Borenius soon met Roger Fry, to whom he became close. Fry introduced him to the art circles in Britain, and he became associated with the Bloomsbury group. Borenius was appointed in 1914 as a lecturer at University College London after Fry left. In 1921, he prepared a catalogue of the Northwick Park collection. After Henry Tonks had established the Edwin Durning-Lawrence chair in art history at the university, Borenius was appointed its first professor in 1922. In 1933 he became director of the excavations of Clarendon Palace near Salisbury, where he continued to dig regularly until 1939.

Though initially a specialist on Italian art, Borenius became increasingly interested in the art of his adopted country. His opinion on art was highly valued, and he worked as a consultant at Sotheby's. He was also an advisor to the art collector Henry Lascelles, 6th Earl of Harewood.

He helped to found the art magazine Apollo in 1925, and became one of its most active contributors. He was also actively involved with The Burlington Magazine, of which he became managing editor during World War II from 1940 to 1945.

He wrote numerous books on art, including English Primitives (1924), The Iconography of St. Thomas of Canterbury (1929), Florentine Frescoes (1930), English Painting in the XVIIIth Century (1938) and Rembrandt: Selected Paintings (1942).

== Diplomacy ==
When Finland became independent of Russia, he acted as secretary of the diplomatic mission (1918) and as representative of Finland in London from 1919. In World War II this role became important as Britain initially sought to cultivate links to Finland, which had been attacked by the Soviet Union during the Winter War, as part of the Nazi-Soviet pact. When Germany invaded Russia, Finland became a de facto ally of the Nazis against the Russians. Finnish leader Field Marshal Mannerheim was careful to keep his distance from Hitler and maintain links to the Western Allies. Borenius knew Mannerheim, and during the Winter War he wrote a laudatory biography of the general.

Borenius was made Secretary-General of the Polish Relief Fund in 1939, created to send aid to Poland and assist Polish refugees in Britain. He had long cultivated links between Poland, Finland and Britain, having been vice-president of the Anglo-Polish society before the war. The anti-Nazi journal Free Europe referred to him as "a living symbol of Polish-Finnish collaboration".

== Hess claims ==
The writer John Harris asserts that Borenius was sent by the British MI6 to Geneva in January 1941. The perilous journey was via Bristol (Whitchurch) to Lisbon (Sintra) by KLM DC-3, and then to Geneva via rail across Spain and Vichy France. The minute book of the Polish Relief Fund records Borenius' absence from mid-January to mid-March 1941. The diary of Ulrich von Hassell also records the trip and Borenius' eventual meeting with Carl Jacob Burckhardt, a leader of the International Red Cross.

Harris also interviewed Borenius' son, Peter, who told him that Claude Dansey of MI6 had supplied a cyanide pill that was "the size of a golf ball". The diary entry makes it clear that Borenius was there to impart the knowledge that Britain was still ready to talk peace "though not for much longer". The key question, Harris argues, is on whose authority was Borenius sent. In the original German diaries, von Hassell states that Borenius was sent by English stellen, which provokes the key question. Who were the English stellen: MI6, royalty, or was it merely a clever ruse? Throughout the 1930s, Borenius's royal connections had flourished. He was art advisor to the Lascelles family and had accompanied Queen Mary to Yorkshire when visiting her daughter Mary.

Notwithstanding that question, Burckhardt clearly acted on the information and by 10 March, Albrecht Haushofer, Rudolf Hess's intermediary, was aware of the meeting and what was discussed. It was on the pretext of a Haushofer/Burckhardt meeting that Albrecht travelled to Geneva on 28 April 1941. A fortnight later, Hess flew to Scotland. Haushofer had returned to Germany via Arosa in Switzerland, where he visited Ilse von Hassell, staying with her recuperating son at the Hotel Isla. It is Harris' contention that at this meeting the necessary navigational information was passed to Hess (via Haushofer) in connection with the forthcoming flight. A year earlier, the British amateur diplomat James Lonsdale-Bryans had used the same location and venue as part of his "semi official" peace negotiations. The von Hassell family returned home to Bavaria on 16 May 1941.

Borenius had returned to London by mid-March 1941 (having been refused entry into Italy) and resumed his secretarial duties to the Anglo-Polish relief organisation. Shortly after his return he met General Władysław Sikorski, prior to his departure for the United States. Sikorski would return to Britain on 11 May 1941, landing at Prestwick, Ayrshire, literally a few hours after Hess had crashed at nearby Eaglesham.

Historian Roger Moorhouse, author of Berlin at War, disputed the claims, stating that "MI6 would have little to gain from luring Hess to Britain. Although nominally important, he was actually a peripheral figure by 1941. (Harris disagrees, making the point that Hess was essentially Party chairman, responsible for party organisation and integration of the captured territories into the Reich.) The most likely theory, according to Moorhouse is that he came over of his own volition."

== Death ==
Borenius was admitted to St Andrew's Hospital, Northampton, in 1946 and transferred to Laverstock House, near Salisbury, where he died in September 1948. Both hospitals specialised in the treatment of mental disorders. Both he and his wife are buried in Coombe Bissett churchyard.

== Recognition ==
In March 2017 a Royal Borough of Kensington and Chelsea blue plaque was affixed to 28 Kensington Gate and unveiled by the Finnish Ambassador. Afterwards a seminar was held at the nearby Finnish Embassy to discuss his life.
