= Doner =

Doner may refer to:

== People ==
- Jeremy Doner (born 1972), American scriptwriter
- Jordan Doner, American photographer
- Kitty Doner (1895–1988), American vaudeville performer
- Michele Oka Doner (born 1945), American artist
- Morey Doner (born 1994), Canadian soccer player
- Rodger Doner (1938–2022), Canadian wrestler
- Timothy Doner (born 1995), American foreign policy analyst

== Other uses ==
- Doner Company, an American advertising agency
- Doner kebab, a Turkish dish
- Ministry of Development of North Eastern Region (DoNER), an Indian ministerial department

== See also ==
- Donar (disambiguation)
- Donner (disambiguation)
- Donor (disambiguation)
