= Donor (disambiguation) =

A donor is an individual or organization that donates something.

Donor may also refer to:

- Donor (fairy tale), a literary stock character
- Donor (horse) (foaled 1944), an American Thoroughbred racehorse
- Donor (semiconductors), a dopant atom in semiconductor design
- "Donor" (Not Going Out), a 2014 television episode
- "Donor" (The Outer Limits), a 1999 television episode
- The Donor, 1995 Canadian film

== See also ==
- Donar (disambiguation)
- Doner (disambiguation)
