= Ilkka Pastinen =

Finnish diplomat (1928–2018)

Ilkka Olavi Pastinen (17 March 1928 – 12 January 2018) was a Finnish ambassador who also served as Assistant Secretary General of the United Nations.

Pastinen was born in Turku. His parents were warehousekeeper Martti Mikael Pastinen and Ilmi Saga Karlström. He graduated from Åbo Akademi University in 1950. He also studied from 1950 to 1951 in Paris at the Instituts d'études politiques.

Pastine served as Assistant to the Ministry for Foreign Affairs from 1952 to 1955; Assistant to the Embassy of Stockholm, 1955–1957; and the Second Division of the United Nations Permanent Representation to New York, 1957–1959.

He was then Secretary of the Ministry for Foreign Affairs from 1960 to 1962; First Secretary of the Finnish Embassy in Beijing, 1962–1964; Deputy Head of the Department for Foreign Affairs, 1964–1966; and the Embassy of London, 1966–1969.

Pastinen then served as Ambassador to the Permanent Representation to the United Nations and Deputy Representative to the UN and the UN Security Council in 1969–1970 as UN Assistant Secretary General and Special Representative of the UN Secretary General on Disarmament Issues in Geneva and New York from 1971 to 1974 as the Negotiating Officer of the Ministry of Foreign Affairs, 1977 as Ambassador and UN Permanent Representative in New York, 1977–1983. He was the Ambassador of Finland to London from 1983 to 1991.

Pastine was an expert and later member of the Finnish delegation in the UN General Assembly, 1957–1961, 1965, 1969, and 1975–1976, as deputy chairman of the delegation in 1970 and Secretary General of the UN's Special Representative in the Conference of the Disarmament matters in Geneva and New York from 1971 to 1974, and as the Negotiating Officer of the Ministry of Foreign Affairs, 1975–1977, and Ambassador and UN Permanent Representative in New York, 1977–1983. Pastinen was the Ambassador of Finland to London from 1983 to 1991.

At the end of the 1960s and early 1970s, Pastin belonged to the Ministry of Foreign Affairs' group called the Junta of the Colonels which included diplomats as Max Jacobson, Aarno Karhilo, Aimo Pajunen, Risto Hyvärinen and Keijo Korhonen. They sought to defend Finland's traditional foreign policy of neutrality against the pressures from the Soviet Union and opposed the goals of the Social Democrats led by Kalevi Sorsa to strengthen their position in the Foreign Ministry.

The Junta of the Colonels tried to promote Jacobson as UN Secretary General with poor success in 1971.

== Marriage ==
Pastinen married Eva Marja Viitanen (1929–2015), a nursing school teacher in 1950.

== Death ==
Pastinen died in Helsinki on 12 January 2018, aged 89.
