= Georg Rafael Donner =

Austrian sculptor

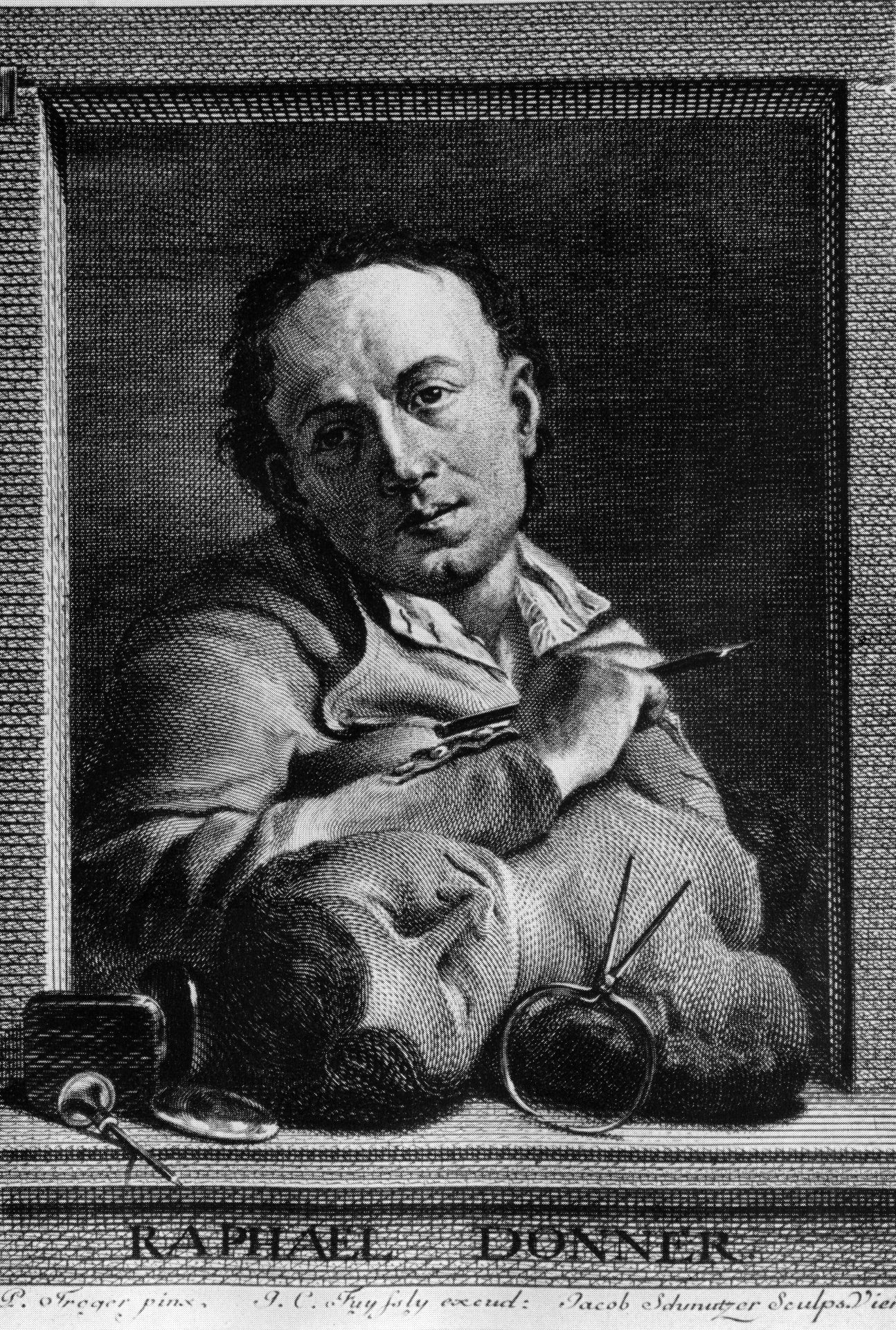
Georg Rafael Donner

The sculpture coin featuring Georg Rafael Donner

Georg Rafael Donner (24 May 1693 – 15 February 1741) was one of the most prolific Austrian sculptors of the 18th century. His style was baroque with some pseudo-ancient additions. He educated many German sculptors of his era, including his son Matthäus Donner.

Donner was born in Essling, Vienna. His work was inspired by nature and by antique sculpture which was deposited in the Vienna's academy. One of Donner's most famous works is Donnersteig in Mirabel Castle, Salzburg (1725–1727), for which he sculpted life-size marble figures. From 1728 he worked in Pozsony at the court of count-bishop Emeric (or Imre) Esterházy, where he sculpted a gravestone for Bishop Esterházy and a horse monument of St. Martin. For almost 10 years he had his studio in the garden of the Summer Archbishop's Palace, at that time just outside Pozsony. In Vienna he created two fountains: Fountain of Austria's rivers (1737–1739) and the source with the sculptures of Perzei and Andromeda in front of the City Hall (1739). One of his last works is the Pieta at the cathedral in Gurk (1741). He died in Vienna.

Georg Rafael Donner was recently selected as the main motif of the Austrian gold euro commemorative coin: The sculpture coin was issued on 13 November 2002. The obverse has a portrait of Donner, with the Palace of the Lower Belvedere in the background. This palace is currently the museum of baroque art in Vienna, and contains much of Donner's work.
