= Jörn Donner =

Finnish writer (1933–2020)

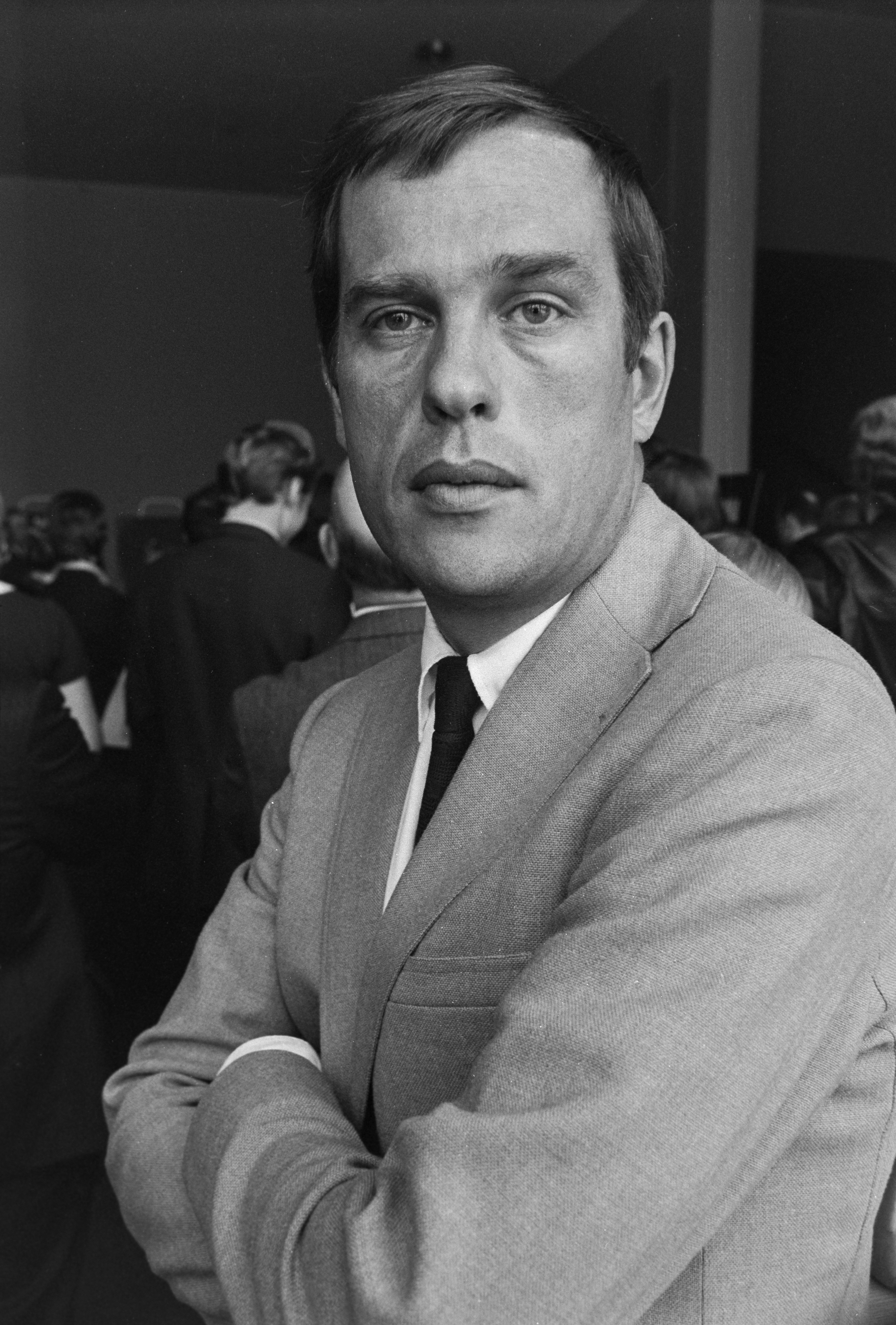
- Donner in 1971
- Born: Jörn Johan Donner; 5 February 1933; Helsinki, Finland
- Died: 30 January 2020 (aged 86); Helsinki, Finland
- Spouse(s): Inga-Britt Wik (1954–1962); Jeanette Bonnier (1974–1988); Bitte Westerlund (1995–2020)
- Awards: Golden Globe Award for Best Foreign Language Film; 1983 Fanny and Alexander

Jörn Johan Donner (5 February 1933 Helsinki, Finland – 30 January 2020 Helsinki) was a Finnish writer, film director, actor, producer, politician and founder of Finnish Film Archive. He was also a publisher, editor, and a prominent literary and film critic. He produced Ingmar Bergman's film Fanny and Alexander, which won four Academy Awards in 1984. Donner also served in the Finnish parliament and the European Parliament, making significant contributions to both cinema and politics.

== Biography ==
Born into the Finland-Swedish Donner family of German descent, Jörn Donner was the youngest son of the linguist Kai Reinhold Donner and Margareta von Bonsdorff, and the grandson of linguist and politician Otto Donner. After graduating from the Svenska normallyceum in 1951, he earned a Master of Arts degree from the University of Helsinki in 1959.

Donner began his career in journalism and criticism in the 1950s. He was the publisher of the magazine Arena (1951–1954), an editor for Ny Tid (1952–1953), and worked as a literary or film critic for numerous publications, including Vapaa Sana (1952–1955), Päivän Sanomat (1957–1958), Nya Pressen (1951–1959), Bonniers Litterära Magasin (1959–1962), Ylioppilaslehti (1961–1963), Hufvudstadsbladet (1952–1962), and Sweden's Dagens Nyheter (1960–1965). He was also a columnist for Hufvudstadsbladet starting in 1980.

He lived and worked for long periods in Sweden, initially as a film director for Sandrews from 1963 to 1966, and later at the Swedish Film Institute, where he served as executive director (1972–1975), film producer (1975–1978), and managing director (1978–1982). He was also the managing director of his own company, Jörn Donner Productions, from 1966. In 1979, he was a member of the jury at the 29th Berlin International Film Festival. From 1981 to 1983, he was the chairman of the Finnish Film Foundation. Internationally Jörn Donner was best known as the producer of Ingmar Bergman's film Fanny and Alexander (Fanny och Alexander, 1982). In 1984 the movie won a total of four Academy Awards including the award for best foreign language film, making him to date the only Finn to receive an Oscar. His novel Far och son (Father and Son) won the Finlandia Prize in 1985. His earlier literary work was recognized with the State Prize for Literature in 1972 and the Society of Swedish Literature in Finland Prize in 1972, 1975, and 1981.

In 1954 he married the Finnish writer Inga-Brit Wik; they had two children and divorced in 1962. Later Wik has described their marriage in her novels. Donner married in 1974 Jeanette Bonnier; they divorced in 1988. In 1995 Donner married the journalist Bitte Westerlund; they had two children. Donner has also two children from his previous relationships. He lived in 1960's eight years with Swedish actress Harriet Andersson and made five films with her. Andersson was also one of Ingmar Bergman's favourite actresses.

Donner was associated with several different political parties, such as SDP and RKP, and was at different times a member both of the Finnish parliament and the European Parliament. He was chairman of the leftist artists' association Kiila from 1957 to 1958 and served on the Helsinki City Council in 1969–1972 and again from 1984. As of 2007 he was again a member of the Finnish parliament for a short while, after Eva Biaudet resigned to take a position at the OSCE.

Donner suffered from prostate and lung cancers. He died of lung disease at Meilahti hospital in Helsinki on 30 January 2020, six days before his 87th birthday. After his death, an archive of thousands of photographs was discovered at his home, showing that Donner was also a skilled photographer. In 2023, Donner's widow Bitte Westerlund, revealed that she had thrown part of his ashes in the compost after discovering his history of infidelity. Most of the ashes were scattered into the sea, in accordance with Donner's wishes.

== Filmography ==
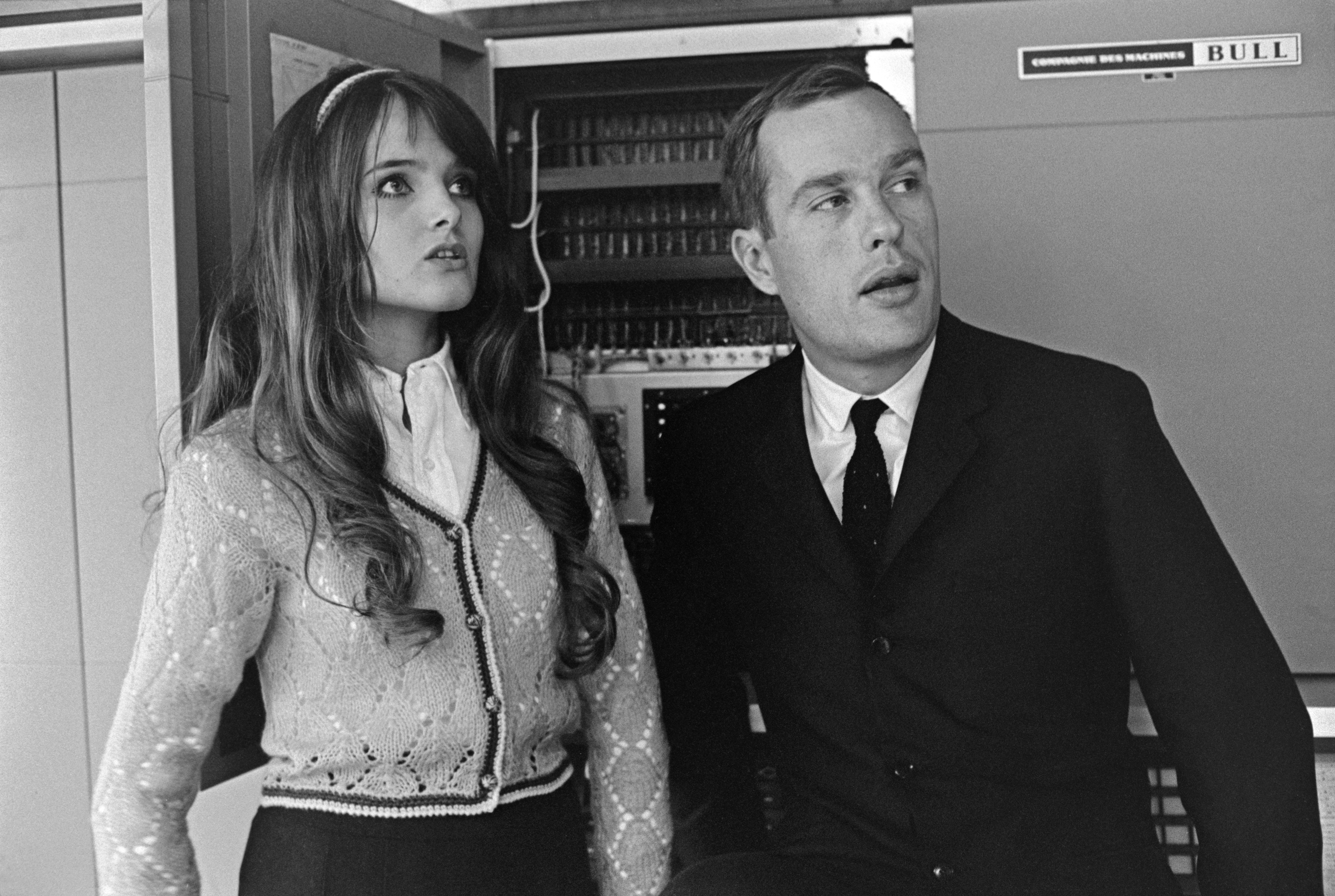
Donner, with actress Kristiina Halkola filming Black on White in 1967

- En söndag i september (A Sunday in September, 1963)
- Att älska (To Love, 1964)
- Här börjar äventyret (Adventure Starts Here, 1965)
- Tvärbalk (Rooftree, 1967)
- Stimulantia (1967)
- Mustaa valkoisella (Black on White, 1968)
- 69 – Sixtynine (1969)
- Anna (1970)
- Naisenkuvia (Portraits of Women, 1970)
- Perkele! Kuvia Suomesta (1971)
- Hellyys (1972)
- Baksmälla (1973)
- Near and Far Away (1976)
- Ingmar Bergmanin maailma (1978)
- Men Can't Be Raped (1978)
- Bergman File, The (1978)
- Yhdeksän tapaa lähestyä Helsinkiä (1982)
- Hockeyfeber (1983)
- Dirty Story (1984)
- Brev från Sverige/Kirjeitä Ruotsista (1988)
- Ingmar Bergman: Om liv och arbete (1998)
- Presidentti (2000)
- The Border (Raja 1918, 2007)
- Kuulustelu (2009)
- Armi elää! (2015)

== Bibliography ==
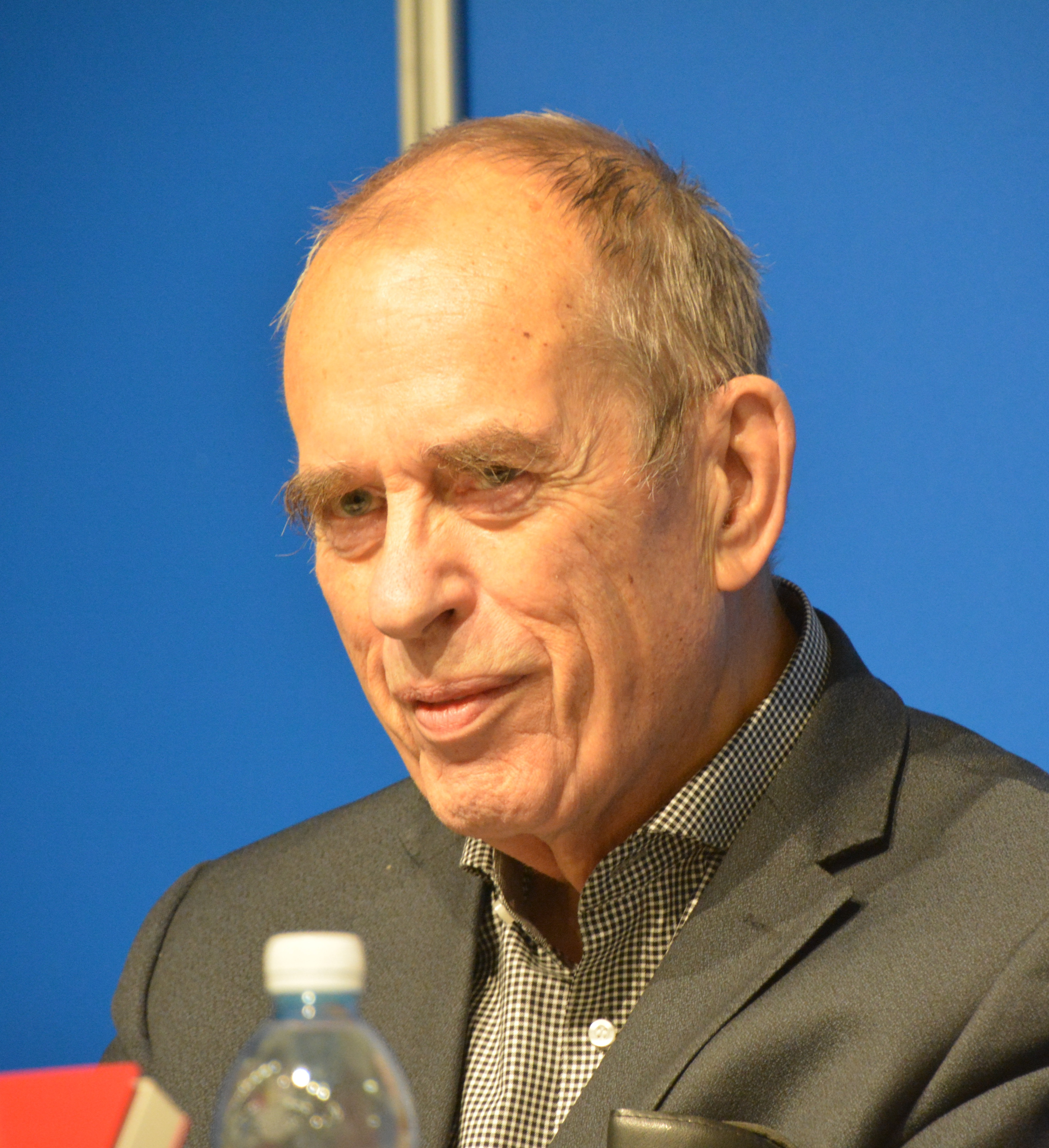
Donner at the Helsinki Book Fair (2015)

- 1951 – Välsignade liv. Söderström. OCLC 58114997
- 1952 – Slå dig inte till ro. Söderström.
- 1954 – Brev. Söderström. OCLC 186657982
- 1955 – Jag, Erik Anders. Söderström. OCLC 482944009
- 1957 – Bordet. Söderström. OCLC 492460897
- 1958 – Rapport från Berlin. Schildts. OCLC 57975963 (Finnish: Berliini — arkea ja uhkaa, trans. Toivo J. Kivilahti, WSOY, 1958)
- 1960 – På ett sjukhus. Söderström. OCLC 1029438638 (Finnish: Terveenä sairaalassa, trans. Arvo Salo, Fennia, 1961)
- 1961 – Helsingfors, Finlands ansikte. Söderström. OCLC 186137682 (Finnish: Ihmisten Helsinki, trans. Seppo Virtanen, WSOY, 1961)
- 1962 – Djävulens ansikte – Ingmar Bergmans filmer. Söderström. OCLC 922592043 (Finnish: Paholaisen kasvot: Ingmar Bergmanin elokuvat, trans. Juha Virkkunen, Otava, 1967)
- 1962 – Rapport från Donau. Söderström. OCLC 57974677 (Finnish: Raportti Tonavalta, trans. Seppo Virtanen, WSOY, 1963)
- 1967 – Nya boken om vårt land. Söderström. OCLC 729142584 (Finnish: Uusi maammekirja, trans. Seppo Heikinheimo, Otava, 1967)
- 1968 – Världsboken. Söderström. OCLC 186997195 (Finnish: Maailmankirja, trans. Jukka Kemppinen, Otava, 1968)
- 1968 – Musta Valkoisella
- 1970 – Tapaus Naisenkuvia. Otava.
- 1971 – Sommar av kärlek och sorg. Söderström. OCLC 19843271 (Finnish: Surun ja rakkauden kesä, trans. Jukka Kemppinen, Otava, 1971)
- 1972 – Marina Maria. Söderström. ISBN 9789515200617 (Finnish: Marina Maria, trans. Jukka Kemppinen, Otava, 1974)
- 1973 – Sverigeboken. Wahlström & Widstrand. ISBN 9789146119418 (Finnish: Matka vieraaseen maahan, trans. Jukka Kemppinen, Otava, 1974)
- 1974 – Nu måste du. Söderström. ISBN 9789515202277 (Finnish: Nyt sinun täytyy, trans. Jukka Kemppinen, Otava, 1975)
- 1976 – Angelas krig. Wahlström & Widstrand. ISBN 9789146123620 (Finnish: Angela, trans. Jukka Kemppinen, Otava, 1976)
- 1976 – Sagt och gjort. Söderström. ISBN 9789515203762
- 1978 – Jakob och friheten. Söderström. OCLC 600964272 (Finnish: Jakob ja kylmä rauha, trans. Jukka Kemppinen, Otava, 1979)
- 1980 – Jag, Jörn Johan Donner född den 5 februari 1933 i Helsingfors. Söderström. ISBN 9789515206121
- 1980 – Ihmisen ääni. Mietekirja aikuisille. WSOY. (trans. Jukka Kemppinen)
- 1981 – Angela och kärleken. Söderström. OCLC 600964176 (Finnish: Angela ja rakkaus, trans. Marja Nieminen, Otava, 1981)
- 1982 – Gabriels dag. Söderström. ISBN 9789515208163 (Finnish: Itsenäisyyspäivä, trans. Seppo Heikinheimo, Otava, 1983)
- 1982 – Dagbok från filminstitutet. OCLC 939124657
- 1984 – Far och son: en komedi. Wahlström & Widstrand. ISBN 9789146147947
- 1985 – Hemåt i höstregn. Söderström. ISBN 9789515210159
- 1985 – Viettelysten aika. Valtion painatuskeskus. ISBN 9789518598971
- 1986 – Motströms. Söderström. ISBN 9789515212115
- 1986 – Presidenten. Söderström. ISBN 9789515210838
- 1989 – Frihetens fångar. Söderström. ISBN 9789515212603
- 1990 – Rapport från Europa. Söderström. ISBN 9789515213242
- 1991 – Fazer 100. Söderström. ISBN 9789515213778
- 1992 – Huset där jag bor. Söderström. ISBN 9789515214348
- 1993 – Tillfälligheters spel. Söderström. ISBN 9789515214669
- 1993 – Husrum
- 1994 – En kärleks historia. Söderström. ISBN 9789515215123
- 1998 – Varför finns jag till? Söderström. ISBN 9789515217059
- 2001 – Hjärtat är en svekfull vän. Söderström. ISBN 9789515219374
- 2002 – Kärlekens ingenmansland. Söderström. ISBN 9789515220226
- 2004 – Livsbilder. Söderström. ISBN 9789515221735
- 2004 – Fåglars skugga. Söderström. ISBN 9789515221858
- 2005 – Himo, Rakkaus ja Raivo. Aamulehti. ISBN 9789525601060
- 2006 – Dödsbilder. Söderström. ISBN 9789515223869
- 2006 – I min fars fotspår – Resor i Sibirien förr och nu. Söderström. ISBN 9789515224071
- 2007 – Diktonius. Schildts. ISBN 9789515016942
- 2009 – Bergman: PM. Ekerlid. ISBN 9789170921100
- 2011 – Anteckningar om Mannerheim. Söderström. ISBN 9789515228420
- 2013 – Mammuten: efterlämnade handlingar. Schildts & Söderströms. ISBN 9789515231154
- 2015 – Lilla mammuten: halvautentiska dagböcker från juli 2013 till februari 2015. Schildts & Söderströms. ISBN 9789515237101
- 2015 – Sverige: resor i ett främmande land. Albert Bonniers Förlag. ISBN 9789100141080
- 2019 – Suomi/Finland II: sista striden. Förlaget M. ISBN 9789523332041

=== Edited works and translations ===
- Privata angelägenheter (1966) by Paavo Haavikko. Translated into Swedish by Donner.
- Tala, svara, lära (1975) by Paavo Haavikko. Translated into Swedish by Donner.
- Ringar i stubben. Dikter och småprosa 1918–1953 (1954) by Elmer Diktonius. Edited by Donner.
- Kirjaimia ja kirjavia (1956) by Elmer Diktonius. Edited by Donner.
- Kirjailija- ja taiteilijaryhmä Kiilan albumi VI (1954). Co-edited with Maija Savutie.
- Diktonius, En bok på 60-ärsdagen den 20 januari 1956 (1956). Co-edited with Stig Carlson and Artur Lundkvist.

== See also ==
- Donner family
