= Bildjournalen =

Swedish youth magazine (1954-1969)

- Categories: Youth magazine
- Publisher: Åhlén & Åkerlund
- Founded: 1954
- Final issue: 1969
- Country: Sweden
- Based in: Malmö
- Language: Swedish
- OCLC: 445314702

Bildjournalen (Swedish: The Picture Journal) was a youth magazine published from 1954 to 1969. Based in Malmö, it was the first youth magazine of Sweden. During its existence it was the most popular magazine in its category.

== History and profile ==
Bildjournalen was established in 1954. The magazine was modeled on Seventeen and Hit Parader magazines. It was part of and published by Åhlén & Åkerlund, with its headquarters in Malmö. A movie magazine, Filmjournalen, merged with it.

The magazine covered all the topics, which young people were interested in, such as music, movies, beauty tips, fashion, novels, news about society and current events. These articles were accompanied by large photographs. The magazine offered several flexi discs. The contributors were the leading Swedish journalists and photographers: Cecilia Hagen, Staffan Heimerson, Anja Notini, Gunilla Pontén, Anders Engman and Bengt H Malmqvist. Bertil Torekull was one of the editors-in-chief of the magazine, who was also the editor-in-chief of another magazine Veckorevyn.

In 1959, Bildjournalen had a circulation of 230,000 copies. The magazine ceased publication in 1969. In 2011 a book about Bildjournalen was published by Premium Publishing.
