= Joachim Donner =

- Born: 28 November 1763; Stockholm, Sweden
- Died: 22 March 1822 (aged 58); Kokkola, Finland
- Spouse: Hedvig Helena Kurtén
- Children: Sofia Fredrica Donner 1795–1869 Alexander Donner 1796–1822; Anders Donner 1796–1857; Joachim Donner 1798–1801; Anna Helena Donner 1800–1866; Joachim Donner 1802–1828; Jacob Donner 1804–1861; Sixtus Donner 1806–1874 Gustava Carolina Donner 1812–1817
- Parents: Alexander Donner 1708–1772 (father); Anna Falander 1728–1805 (mother)

Joachim Donner (28 November 1763, Stockholm, Sweden– 22 Mars 1822, Kokkola, Finland) was a commercial councillor, shipowner, and merchant. Around the turn of the 19th century, Donner was one of the most capable shipowners and merchants in Finland. He contributed greatly to making Kokkola, his hometown, Finland's most important maritime city. Donner was a versatile and active merchant whose business operations included retail and wholesale trade, domestic and international trade, tobacco manufactory, ship outfitting, sawmill operations, and the production of tar. He also served as mayor of his hometown.

== Family ==
Joachim Donner was the son of the wholesale merchant Alexander Donner and Anna Falander. The family's history in Finland began around the turn of the 18th century, when his grandfather, Joachim Donner Senior (1669–1748), son of the amber craftsman Jürgen Donner in Lübeck, moved from Lübeck to Nyen. After a short time in Nyen, Joachim Donner Senior moved to Stockholm, where he founded a trading house later taken over by his son Alexander. Alexander Donner moved to Kokkola in 1770.

In 1794, Joachim Donner married Helena Kurtén. Together they had nine children: three daughters and six sons.

== Career ==
When Donner was ten years old, his father Alexander died, and he was forced to begin his business career at a young age. He may have received financial support from his wealthy uncle Abraham Falander in Vaasa. Donner studied under the most renowned shipbuilder in Kokkola, Anders Telin, and was also taught by Master Jacob Tengström. Joachim Donner received burgher rights in Kokkola in 1788.

Donner achieved success in the tar trade and shipping during the French Revolutionary Wars in the late 18th and early 19th centuries. In the early 1790s and again in the early 1800s, he began outfitting ships. According to wealth tax records from 1800 to 1803, Donner was the fifth wealthiest person in Kokkola. His taxable property and the value of his assets amounted to 7,700 riksdaler.

During the Finnish War of 1808–1809, Donner fled to the parish of Skellefteå in Västerbotten, Sweden, where he acquired a one-fifth share in the Morö silver mine — which he sold in 1816.

At the beginning of Finland's autonomous period, Donner recognized the benefits that freight operations gained from the timber trade in Viborg. He sent his son Anders Donner to apprentice at a trading house in Viborg and to act as his father's representative in the city.

Donner actively participated in public life, and in 1795 he was elected an honorary member of the Society for General Civic Knowledge in Stockholm. Together with other prominent burghers, he founded the Reading Society in Kokkola in 1800 — its leader became Provost Anders Chydenius. In 1812, Donner was granted the title of Commercial Councillor. In 1813, he was appointed by the Vaasa Court of Appeal as acting mayor of Kokkola until the end of 1820.

In 1814, Donner was part of the deputation that presented the congratulations of the Finnish people to Emperor Alexander I after Napoleon was defeated. From 1815 onward, Donner was a member of the Finnish Economic Society, and from 1816 he served on a committee investigating the development of trade, agriculture, and industry in the Vaasa province. In 1821, he was awarded the Finnish Economic Society's silver medal for his efforts in promoting flax cultivation.

During his career as a merchant, Joachim Donner built an extensive international business network. He maintained contacts with the most important trading houses in the Baltic region, as well as with Great Britain, Portugal, the Netherlands, and the Mediterranean area. During his lifetime, Donner owned at least twelve merchant ships of various sizes.

At the time of his death, Donner owned or held shares in six large ships and an equal number of smaller vessels. The combined tonnage of the ships was 487 läster.

The net value of Joachim Donner's estate exceeded 70,000 silver rubles, and his debts were few. His property included, among other things, the first stone house in Kokkola.
