= Ossian Donner =

Finnish industrialist, engineer and diplomat (1866–1957)

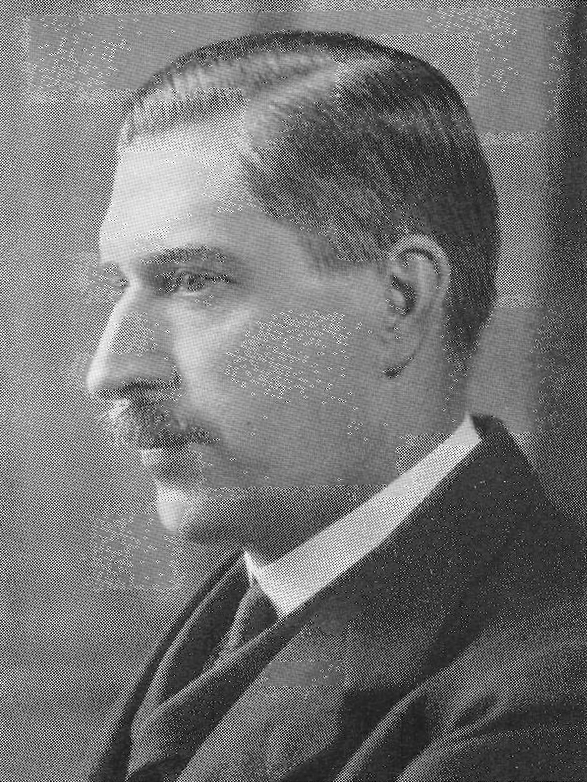
Ossian Donner, date unknown

Ossian Donner (24 March 1866 – 2 August 1957) was a Finnish industrialist, engineer and diplomat.

== Biography ==
Donner founded the wool mill in Hyvinkää and served as CEO of the United Wool Factory until 1918.

In 1901 he and his Scottish wife, Violet Marion McHutchen (1869-1944), commissioned the Scottish architect (Sir) Robert Lorimer to design a house on Mauritzgatan 6 in Kruununhaka in Helsinki for them and their two children. Since the early 1930s it has been the seat of Svenska Klubben.

During the 1918 Finnish Civil War, his wife saw Russian officers being executed in a park the near their home. Shocking war experiences forced the family to move to London, where Ossian Donner became Finland's Representative and later became Chargé d'affaires to the United Kingdom in 1919.

During the Åland Islands dispute (1917-1921), he was also Finland's Special Envoy at the League of Nations.

He made a speech against the Soviet Union which ended his diplomatic career.

He was released from Finland as Envoy to London in 1925. After that, he settled permanently in England and gained British citizenship. In 1936 he bought the country house and the 1200-acre deer park at Hurstbourne Park, near Whitchurch, Hampshire.

Ossian Donner belonged to the Donner family. He was the son of Professor Otto Donner, grandson of Anders Donner and brother of the linguist and right-wing activist Kai Donner. The British Conservative MP Sir Patrick Donner was Ossian's son.

Donner is buried at the St Andrew's Church cemetery in Hurstbourne Priors Civil Parish in Basingstoke and Deane Borough in Hampshire, England.

Donner Park is located in the center of Hyvinkää, where there is also a 14-meter obelisk commemorating Donner, a commemoration of the wool industry and a fountain.

== Selected publications ==
Suomen ja Venäjän välisistä kauppa-ja tullisuhteista. Esittänyt O. Donner. Porvoossa: Werner Söderström'in Kirjapainossa [1892?] [on Trade and customs relations between Finland and Russia]

Åtta år. Memoaranteckningar från åren 1918-1926. [London]: privately printed at Oxford University Press,1927 (in Swedish)

My time: memories and impressions from a long life; English translation by Larl Johan and Kristian Donner. 2013

== See also ==
- Donner family
