= Pekka Huhtaniemi =

Finnish diplomat

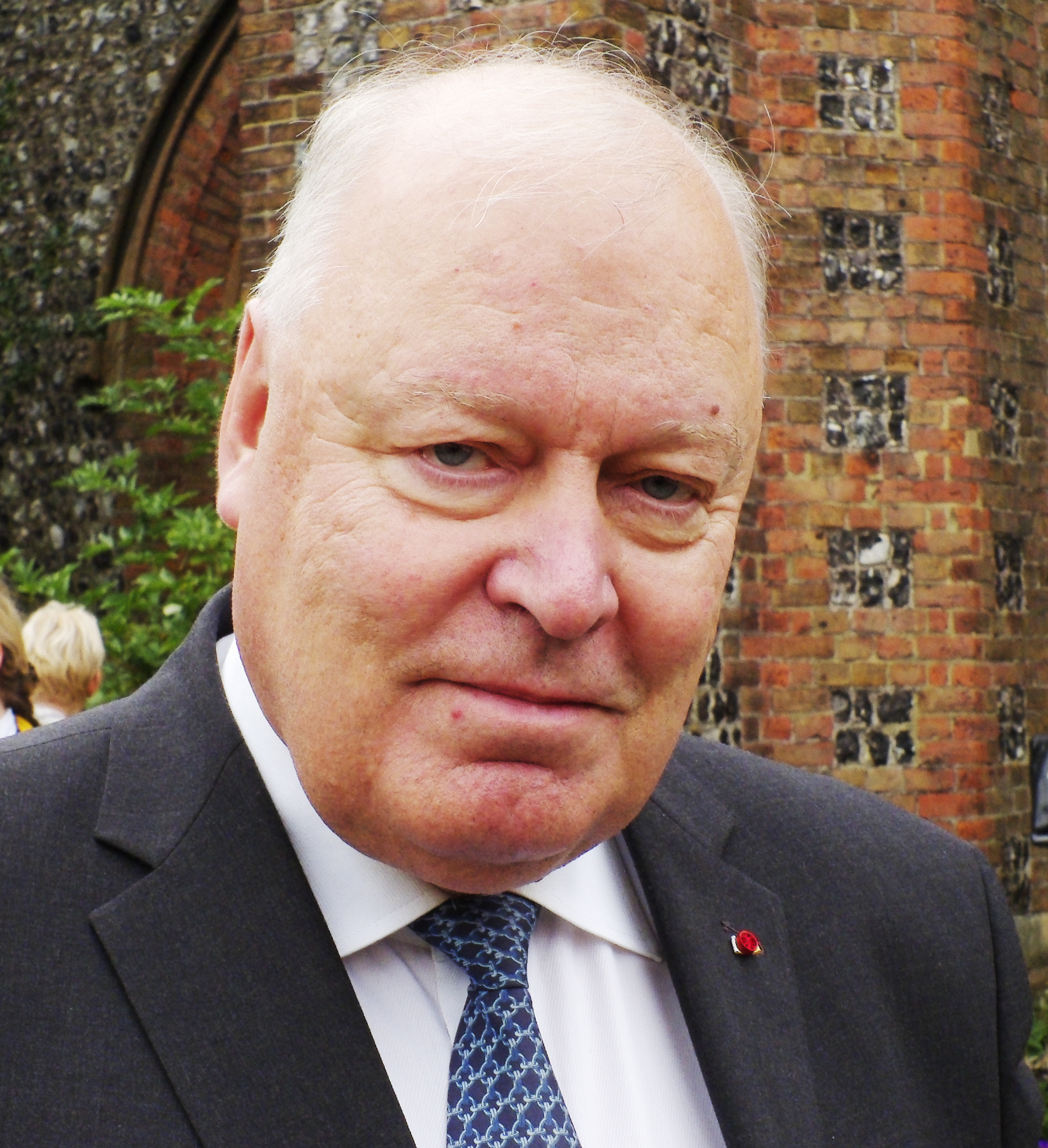
Huhtaniemi in 2013

Pekka Juhani Huhtaniemi (born 9 November 1949, in Valkeakoski) is a Finnish diplomat. He served as Finland's ambassador to the United Kingdom from 2010 to 2015. From 2006 to 2010, Huhtaniemi was the Undersecretary of State for Trade in Foreign Affairs.

== Early life and education ==
Huhtaniemi graduated as an undergraduate in 1968 and a Master of Political Science from the University of Helsinki in 1971.

== Career ==
Huhtaniemi joined the Ministry for Foreign Affairs in 1972.

From 1995 to 1998, Huhtaniemi served as chief cabinet secretary to Erkki Liikanen at the European Commission in Brussels. He served as Ambassador at the Finnish Permanent Representation in Geneva, 1998-2003 and Oslo, 2003-2005.

== Other activities ==
- European Bank for Reconstruction and Development (EBRD), Ex-Officio Alternate Member of the Board of Governors (2006-2010)

== Personal life ==
Huhtaniemi is married and has three children.
