= Filmjournalen =

Swedish film magazine

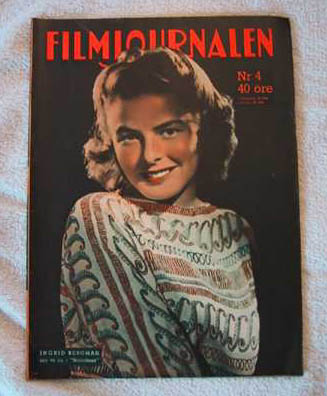
Swedish film magazine Filmjournalen; a 1947 issue. On cover: Ingrid Bergman.

Filmjournalen was Sweden's largest and most influential film magazine published between 1919 and 1953. The magazine was printed and based in Stockholm. Its publisher was Åhlén och Åkerlunds tidskriftsförlag.

Filmjournalen featured the latest news on Swedish and international films, interviews with stars and directors, articles on film genres, reviews, premiere night photos of the stars, on-set reports from studios during filming (both in Sweden and internationally; as well as on great Hollywood films where Filmjournalen had their own reporters and photographers present). There were in every number glossy photographs of stars featured on full pages inside the magazine and—of course—on the cover.

In 1953 Filmjournalen became part of the more "broad culture" magazine Bildjournalen, which not only featured news on films, but also on what was going on in the world of art, culture, theatre and society in general, with interviews with politicians and other famous personalities.
