= Donner family =

The Donner family is one of the renowned and wealthy Finland-Swedish families that grew in importance during the times of the Grand Duchy of Finland. Family members have been influential in Finnish politics and culture.

== Notable people ==
- Jürgen Donner (died c. 1681)
- Jochim Donner (1669–1748)
- Alexander Donner (1708–1772)
- Joachim Donner (1763–1822)
- Anders Donner Sr. (1796–1857)
  - Anders Donner Jr. (1827–1858)
    - Anders Severin Donner (1854–1938), astronomer
      - Arthur Donner (1884–1928)
      - Sven Donner (1890–1970)
        - Märta Donner (1922–2013)
  - Alexander Donner (1827–1892)
    - Joakim Otto Evert Donner (1864–1942)
      - Gustav Donner (1902–1940)
      - Heinrich Wolfgang Donner (1904–1980)
  - Otto Donner (1835–1909), linguist, publisher and politician
    - Ossian Donner (1866–1957), industrialist and diplomat
      - Sir Patrick Donner (1904–1988), British Member of Parliament, son of Ossian.
    - Otto Donner Jr. (1871–1932)
      - Hans Otto Donner (1903–1982)
        - Henrik Otto Donner (1939–2013), musician and co-founder of Love Records
    - Uno Donner (1872–1958), married Olly Donner (1881–1956)
    - Karl Reinhold "Kai" Donner (1888–1935), linguist and politician
      - Kai Otto Donner (1922–1995) professor of zoology
        - Kristian Donner (1952–)
          - Ulla Donner (1988–)
      - Joakim Donner (1926–), professor of geology and paleontology. Son of Kai Donner (1888–1935).
      - Jörn Donner (1933–2020), writer, film director, actor, producer and politician. Brother of Joakim Donner.
        - Johan Donner (1955–)
        - Jakob Donner-Amnell (1959–)
        - Daniel Donner (1988–)
        - Rafael Donner (1990–)
    - Harry Donner (1889–1954)
    - Eva Louise Tigerstedt, née Donner (1890–1967)

== See also ==
- Swedish-speaking population of Finland
