= Donner, Louisiana =

- Unincorporated community
- Location within Louisiana Location within the United States
- Coordinates: 29°41′45″N 90°56′39″W
- Country: United States
- State: Louisiana
- Parish: Terrebonne
- Elevation: 3 ft (0.91 m)
- Time zone: UTC-6 (Central (CST))
  - Summer (DST): UTC-5 (CDT)
- ZIP code: 70352
- Area code: 985
- GNIS feature ID: 543149

Donner is an unincorporated community in Terrebonne Parish, Louisiana, United States. Its ZIP code is 70352.
