= Donner (crater) =

Lunar impact crater

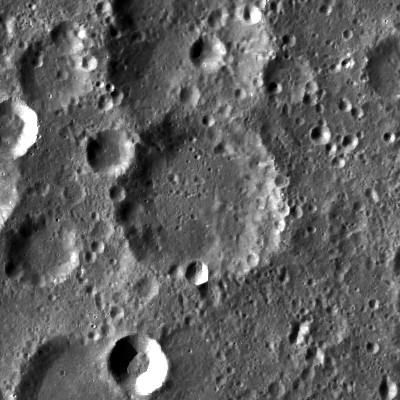
- LRO mosaic
- Coordinates: 31.4°S 98.0°E
- Diameter: 55.05 km (34.21 mi)
- Depth: Unknown
- Colongitude: 263° at sunrise
- Eponym: Anders Donner

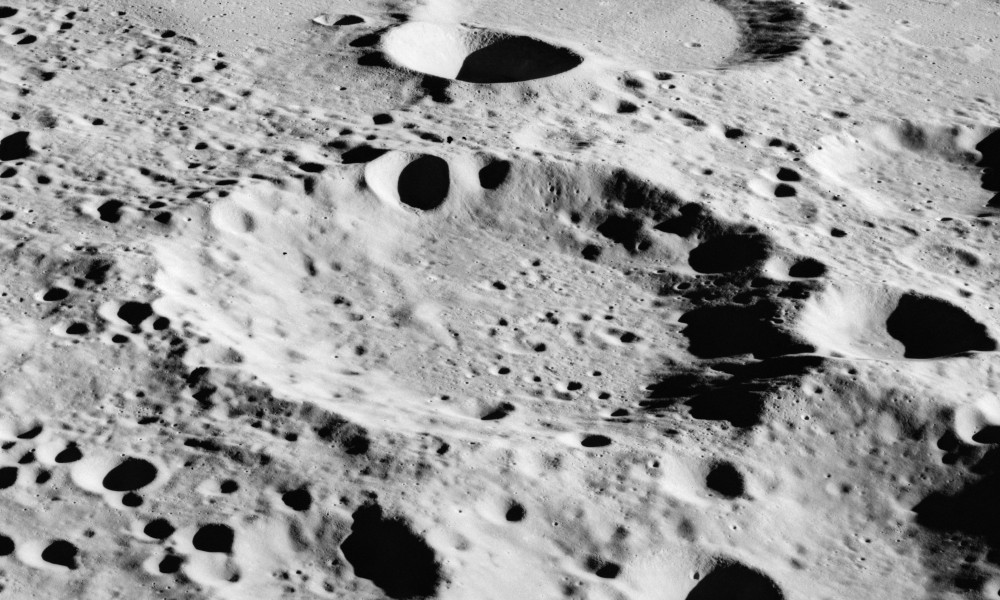
Oblique Apollo 15 image, facing south

Donner is a lunar impact crater on the far side of the Moon. It is located just to the northeast of the Mare Australe, behind the southeastern limb of the Moon. To the northeast is the larger Titius formation, while the basalt-flooded Abel lies to the southwest.

This crater has a moderately eroded outer rim, and several small and tiny craterlets lie along the edge. A joined pair of small craters lie across the southern rim and inner wall, including the Copernican period crater Donner M. An unnamed, crater-like feature with about the same diameter as Donner is attached to the northern outer rim. The structure along the inner wall has been softened and rounded by a long history of minor impacts.

The interior floor is relatively level, and is pock-marked by multiple tiny craterlets. There is a curving ridge in the southern part of the floor that is attached to the inner wall, and possibly forms the remnant of a small crater rim.

This formation is named after Finnish astronomer Anders Donner (1854-1938). Its designation was formally adopted by the International Astronomical Union in 1970.

== Satellite craters ==
By convention these features are identified on lunar maps by placing the letter on the side of the crater midpoint that is closest to Donner.

Donner	Latitude	Longitude	Diameter
M	32.2° S	98.0° E	8 km
N	33.2° S	97.1° E	19 km
P	33.5° S	96.3° E	39 km
Q	34.3° S	95.6° E	15 km
R	34.4° S	92.3° E	15 km
S	32.1° S	92.9° E	23 km
T	31.1° S	94.8° E	46 km
V	30.5° S	95.7° E	19 km
Z	29.7° S	97.8° E	13 km

Donner M lies across the southern rim of the larger Donner. An impact flow extends from this satellite formation to the south.
