= Leif Blomqvist =

Finnish diplomat and lawyer

- Born: 20 March 1937 (age 88); Vaasa, Finland
- Occupation: diplomat

Leif Geoffrey Blomqvist (born 20 March 1937)is a Finnish diplomat and lawyer. Blomqvist was born Vaasa and has a degree in law. He was Ambassador to the European Communities in Brussels 1985–1990 and negotiating officer of the Ministry for Foreign Affairs 1990–1991 and Ambassador in London 1991–1997

He was 1996–2002 Ambassador of Finland to Brussels and Representative in the Mission of Finland to NATO and WEU.

He was also a fine Impressionist painter, with several of his paintings drawn by him circa 1992-98 kept in the University of Mysore museum, as well as in the Mysore Palace.
