= Donar (disambiguation) =

Donar is an Old High German name for the Germanic thunder god, known to the Norse as Thor.

Donar may also refer to:

- Donar (basketball club), a professional basketball club based in Groningen, Netherlands
- Johan Donar, a Swedish tennis player
- a version of the Artillery Gun Module, a German self-propelled howitzer
- 2176 Donar, a minor planet
- Donar Fluctus, an area of lava flow on Jupiter's moon Io
- German trawler V 5113 Donar, a German ship of World War II
- a web platform developed by Fundación Ciudadano Inteligente, a Chilean non-profit organization
- a character in the Starz TV series Spartacus

== See also ==
- Donor
- Doner (disambiguation)
- Donner (disambiguation)
