= Jordan Doner =

American photographer and visual artist

- Occupations: photographer, visual artist
- Years active: 1990s–present
- Known for: conceptual photography, fashion photography

Jordan Doner is a New York City based photographer and visual artist.

His conceptual work and photography have been exhibited at P.S. 1 Museum, The Fragmental Museum at the Cutlog NY fair, ROX Gallery, Steven Kasher Gallery, Serge Sorokko Gallery, Miami Art Basel, Milk Gallery, and featured in the Arts section of the New York Times, the Miami Herald, BLOUIN ARTINFO, Cultured Magazine, Art News, The Art Newspaper, Purple Diaries, and auctioned at Christies. His cultural criticism has been published by Thadeaus Ropec Gallery in Paris.

Doner's design work has been featured at the Museum of Art and Design in New York, the Whitney Museum Store and is part of the permanent collection of both the Cooper Hewitt Museum, the MET Costume Institute, and the Louvre.

His fashion work has appeared on the covers of international editions of Vogue and Bazaar as well as in the pages of Interview, Wallpaper, Surface, Jalouse, GQ, V, Visionaire, and other titles. His clients include Banana Republic, Nautica, Perry Ellis, Kate Spade, Louis Vuitton, Subaru, C&A, Deutsche Grammophon, Saatchi Gallery London, and the Ritz Carlton.

Doner's early portraiture includes Timothy Leary, Allen Ginsberg, and modernist icon Morris Lapidus; contemporary artists Vito Acconci, Peter Halley, and Peter Coffin; pop stars Lil' Kim, Foxy Brown, the Brazilian Girls, the Kills, Rob Zombie, and designers Dominico Dolce & Stefano Gabbana. Also China Chow, Bijou Phillips, Elodie Bouchez, Devon Aoki, and Olga Kurylenko and Gerald Butler; Raquel Zimmerman, Coco Rocha, Irina Lazareanu, Adriana Lima, Doutzen Kroes, and Mayrina Linchuk.
