= Päivi Luostarinen =

Finnish diplomat (born 1955)

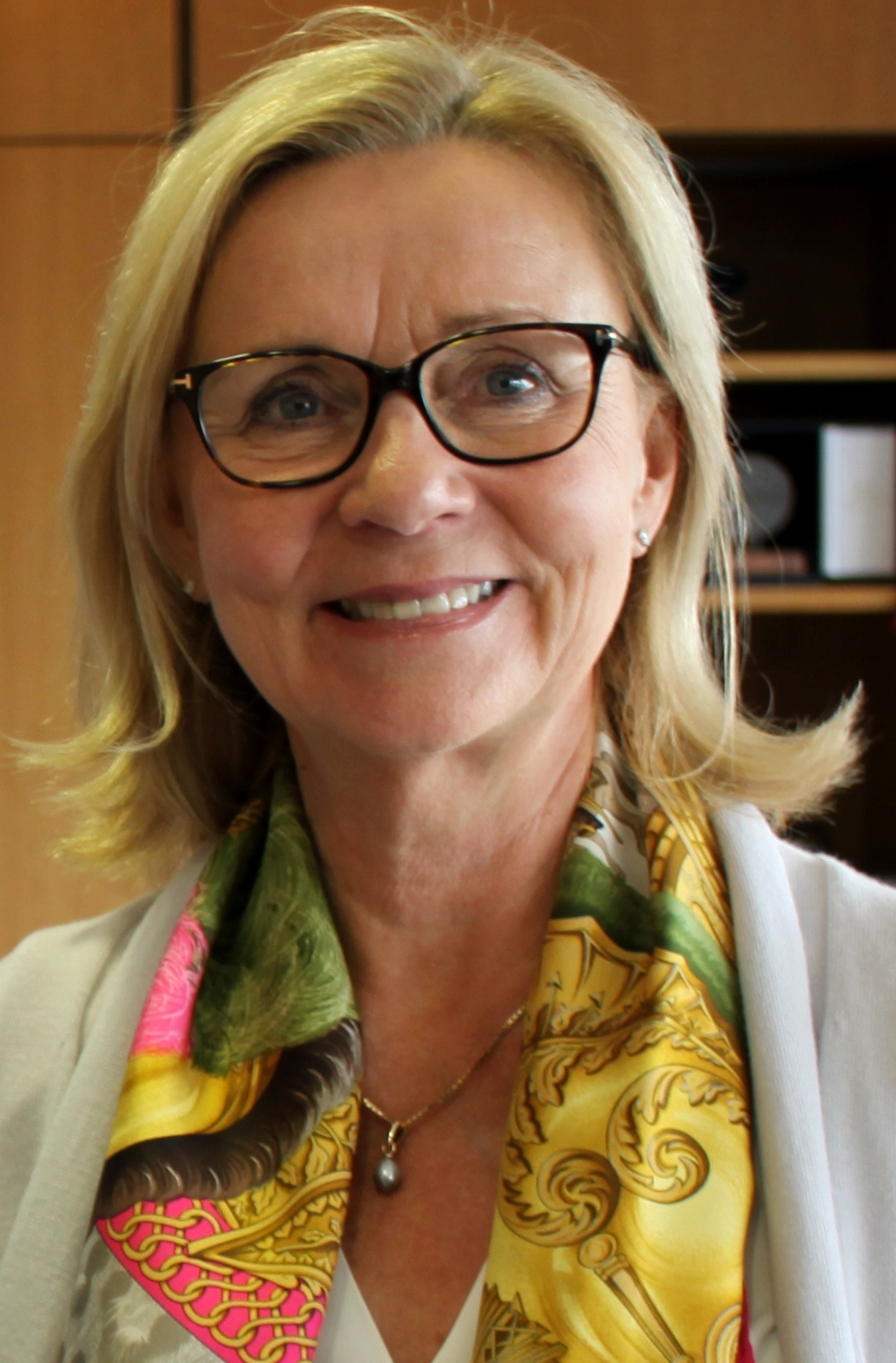
- Päivi Luostarinen in 2018
- Born: January 13, 1955 (age 71)

Päivi Luostarinen (born 13 January 1955) is a Finnish diplomat. She has been employed by the Ministry for Foreign Affairs since 1981 and served as Finnish Ambassador at the Finnish Embassy in London from September 2015 until June 2019.

Luostarinen has completed a law degree at the University of Helsinki in 1980 and completed a Diplomatic Course in Foreign Affairs in 1981. Luostarinen moved to London from the post of Ambassador of Finland to Berlin, where she was from 2011. Prior to that, she served as Head of Department for the European Department of the Ministry for Foreign Affairs 2008–2011. Luostarinen has worked in the Foreign Ministry for several positions at the Legal, Political, Administrative and Trade Policy Department, the EU Secretariat, and the Head of the Department of the Americas and the Asia Department of the Foreign Ministry. She has also served at the Finnish Permanent Representation at the United Nations in New York 2006–2007 and at the Permanent EU Delegation in Brussels. Luostarinen was also a member of the Commissioner Erkki Liikanen's Cabinet at the European Commission in Brussels 1995–1996.
