= Anders Donner =

Finnish astronomer (1854–1938)

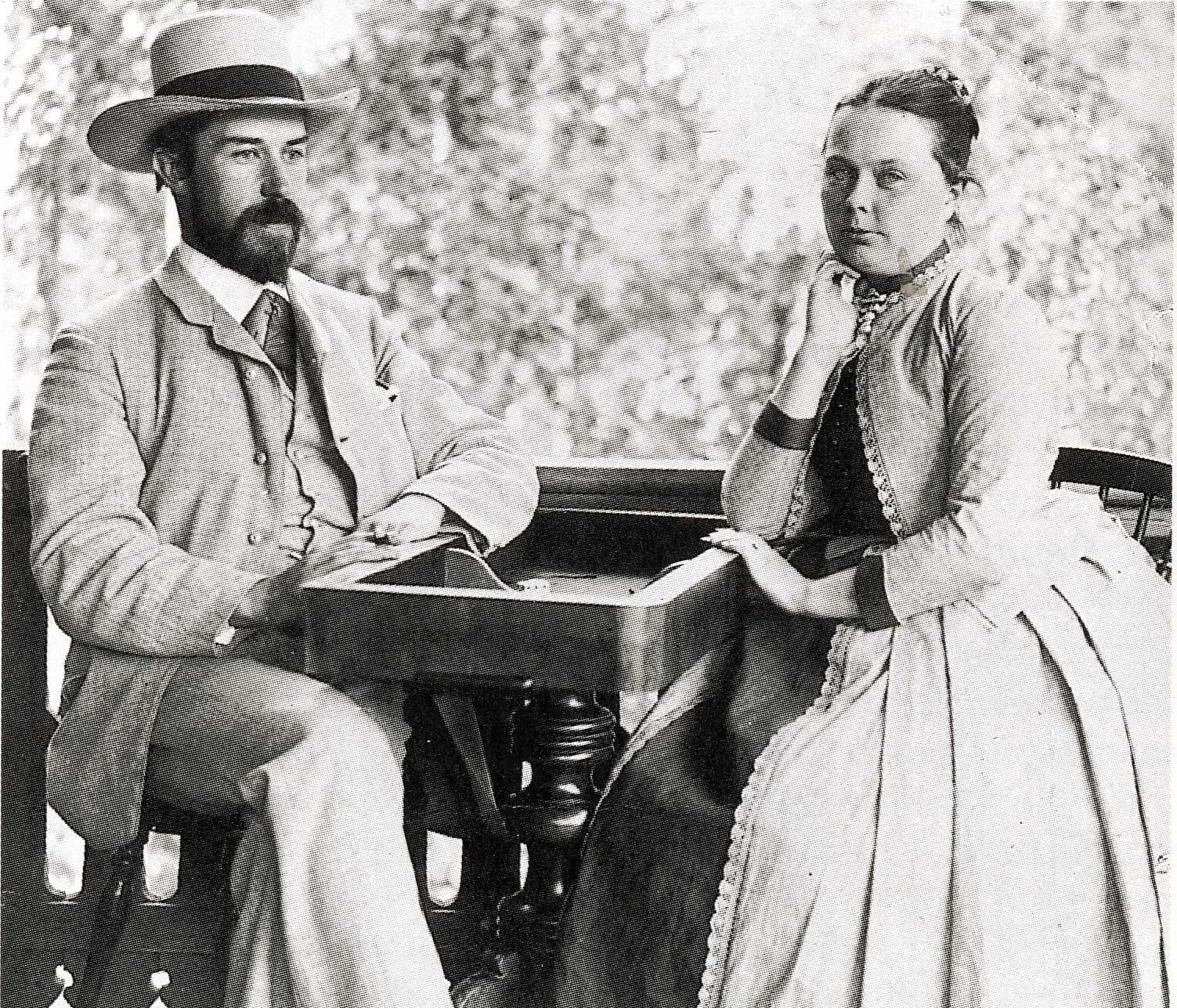
Anders Donner and his wife Elin Donner, 1889

Anders Donner (November 5, 1854 – April 15, 1938) was a professor of astronomy at the University of Helsinki observatory between 1883 and 1915. Before that, he served as a docent of astronomy between 1881 and 1883. He was the rector of the university between 1911 and 1915 and acting chancellor 1917–1919 and 1921–1926.

Under the leadership of Donner, the observatory participated in the international star directory and star map project "Carte du Ciel". The star directory photograph work began in 1890 in Helsinki and it was ready in 1937. The Helsinki directory contains about 285,000 stars, their luminance and precise positions. Donner donated most of the work to the university.

The crater Donner on the far side of the Moon and the asteroid 1398 Donnera are named after him.

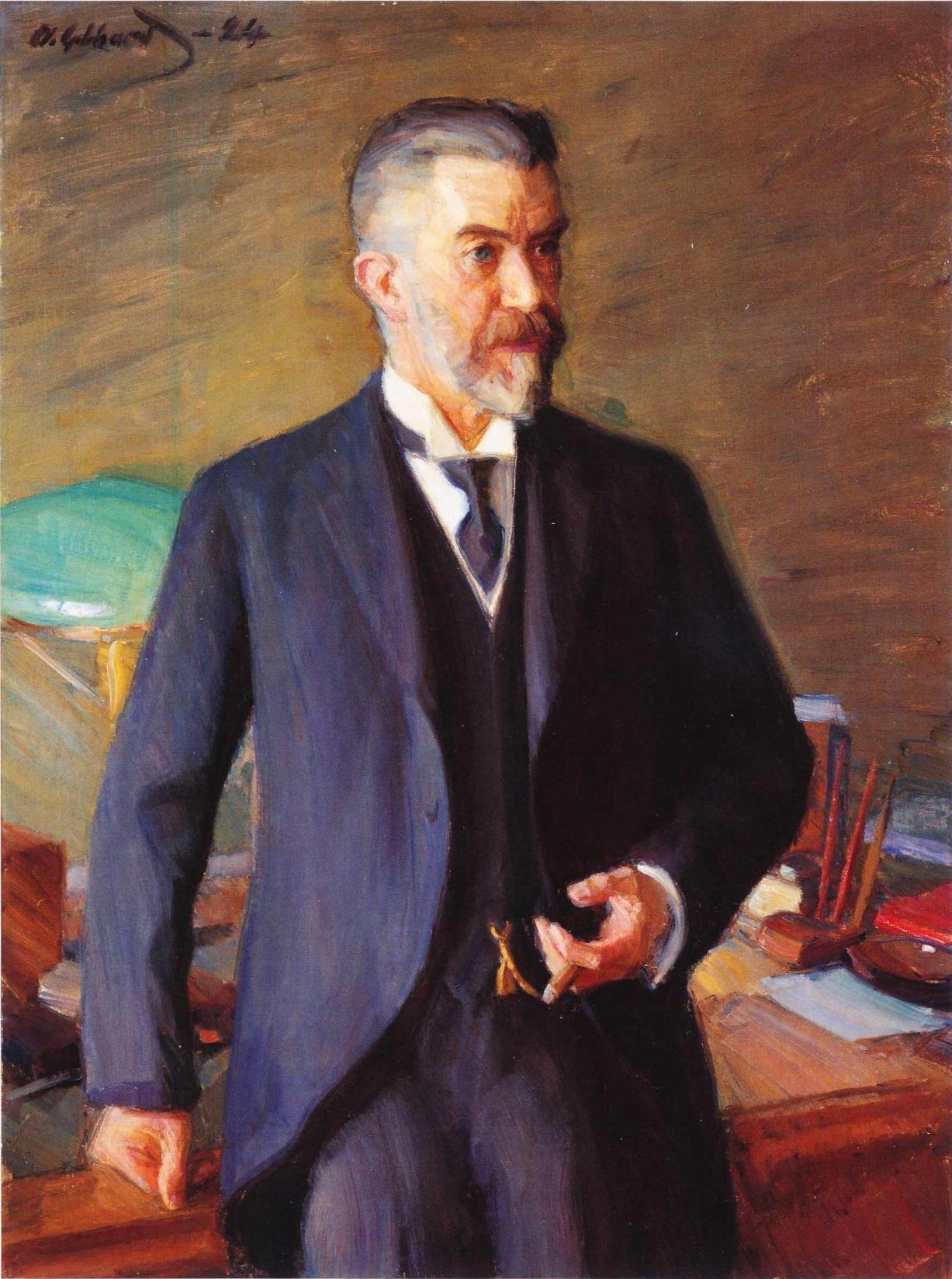
Portrait by Albert Gebhard, 1924

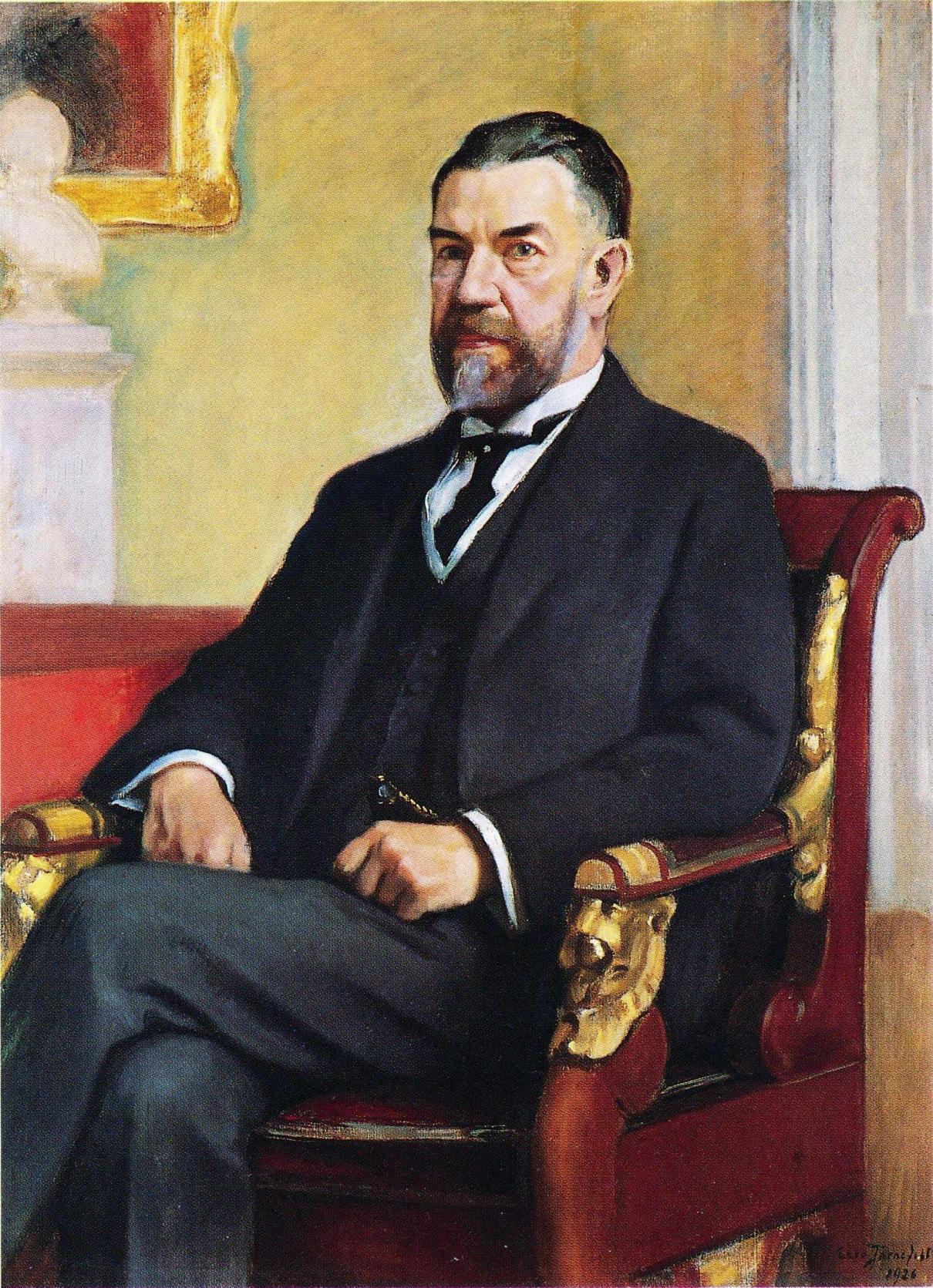
Portrait by Eero Järnefelt, 1926

Educational offices
Preceded by Ivar Heikel	Rector of Imperial Alexander University; 1911–1915	Succeeded by Waldemar Ruin

== See also ==
- Donner family
