= Matthäus Donner =

Austrian sculptor

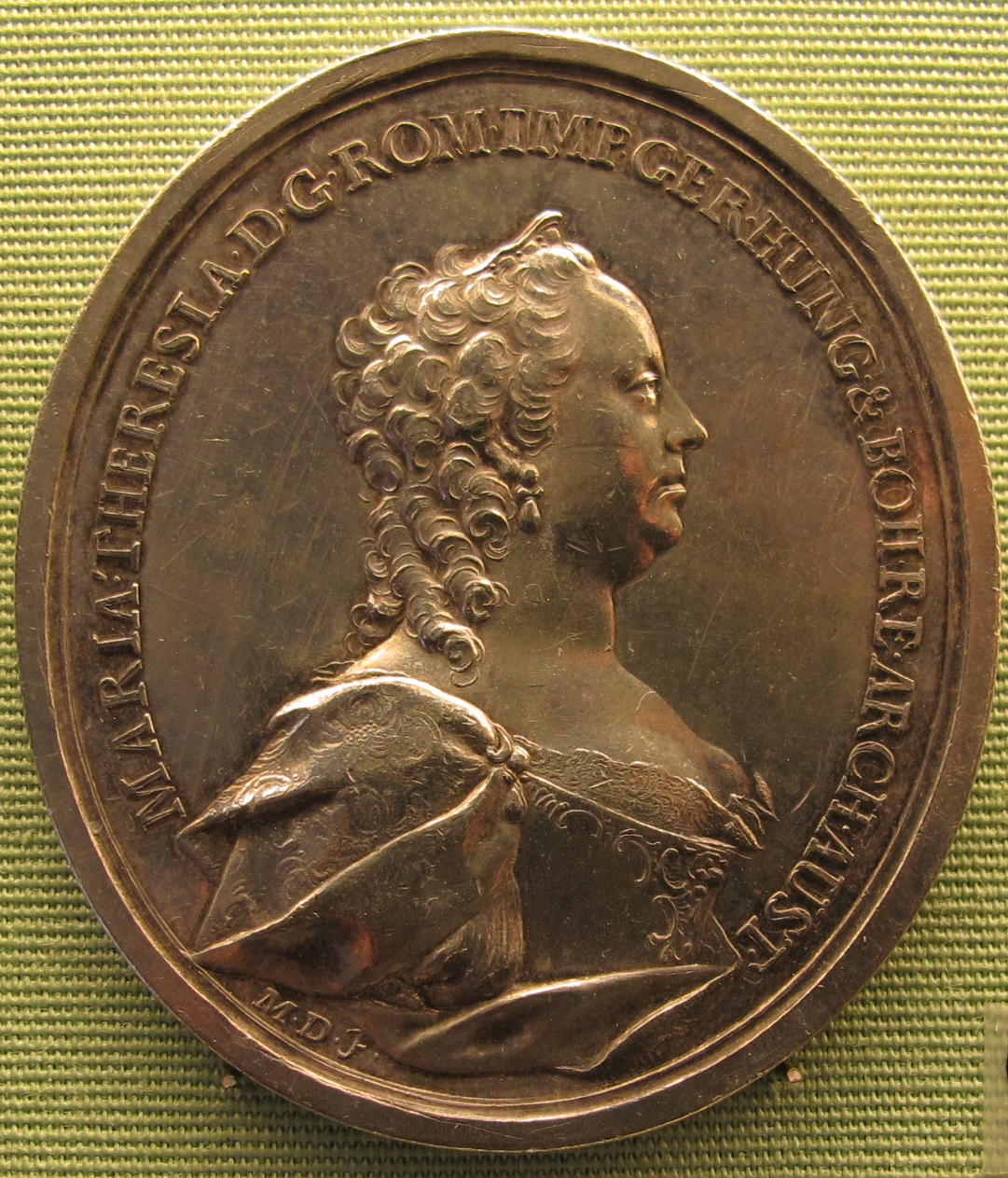
Medal of Maria Theresa, 1765

Matthäus Donner (1704–1756) was an Austrian sculptor known for his relief carvings and medals.
