= Kai Donner =

Finnish linguist and politician (1888–1935)

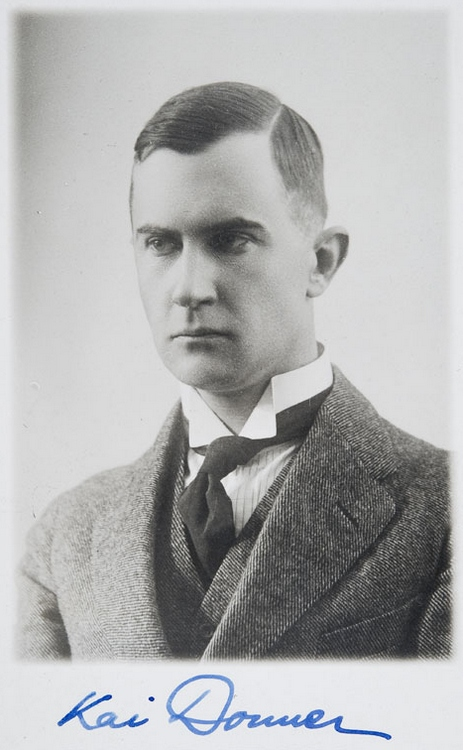
- Donner, 1916
- Born: Karl Reinhold Donner; 1 April 1888; Helsinki, Grand Duchy of Finland, Russian Empire
- Died: 12 February 1935 (aged 46); Helsinki, Finland
- Resting place: Hietaniemi Cemetery
- Education: University of Helsinki; University of Cambridge
- Known for: Expeditions to Siberia; first biography of Mannerheim
- Spouse: Margareta von Bonsdorff (m. 1914)
- Scientific career
- Fields: Uralic languages, ethnography
- Workplaces: University of Helsinki

Karl Reinhold "Kai" Donner (1 April 1888 – 12 February 1935) was a Finland Swede linguist, ethnographer and political activist. He carried out expeditions to the Samoyedic and Ket peoples in Siberia between 1911 and 1914, and was docent of Uralic languages at the University of Helsinki from 1924. A central figure in Finland's independence movement, he was active in the Jäger movement and later became a prominent leader of the Lapua movement. He is also known for writing the first authoritative biography of Mannerheim.

== Biography ==
=== Early life and Siberian expeditions ===
Donner was the son of professor (later senator) Otto Donner, himself a noted philologist, and Wilhelmina Sofia Charlotta Munck. Kai studied Finno-Ugric philology at the University of Helsinki from 1906. In 1911, he studied at Cambridge under James Frazer, A. C. Haddon, and W. H. R. Rivers at the same time as his better-known contemporary, Bronisław Malinowski. He earned a Master of Arts degree from the University of Helsinki in 1911, followed by a Licentiate in 1921 and a Doctorate in 1923.

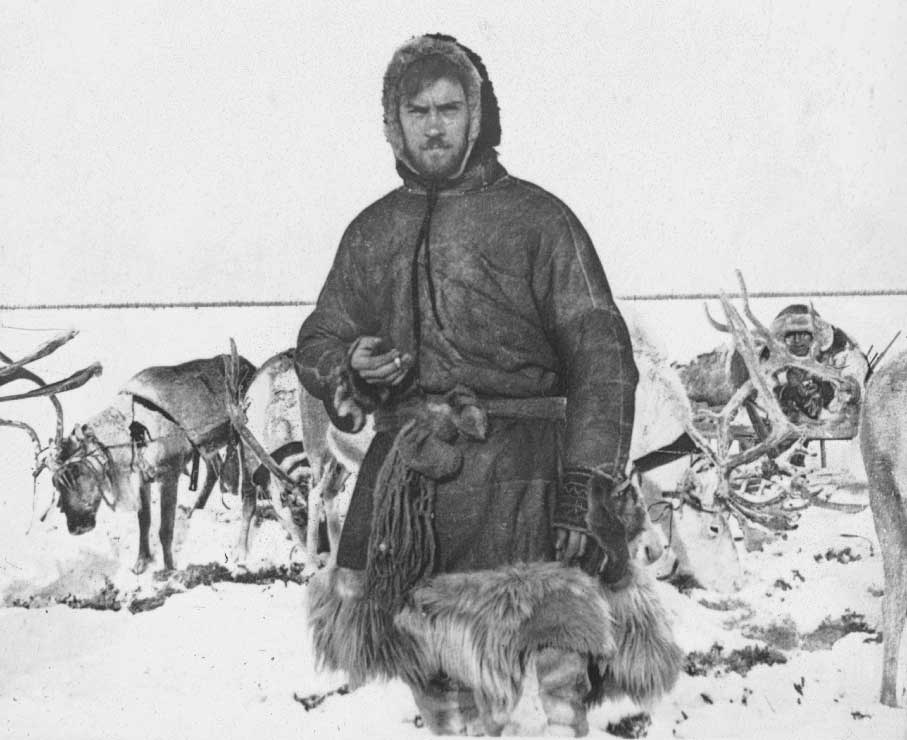
Kai Donner in his malitsa on the tundra, 1913.

Studying the Finno-Ugric-speaking peoples of Siberia had become an important part of the "national sciences" that arose in answer to the interest in national "roots" following the "National Awakening" of the mid-19th century. Donner decided early on to follow in the footsteps of pioneer philologist and explorer M. A. Castrén (1813–1852). On his first trip he travelled along the upper reaches of the Ob and most of the Yenisey between 1911 and 1913. His second trip took him to the Ob, Irtysh, and upper Yenisei. Living with the Nenets and Khanty people, Donner studied not only the language but also the way of life and beliefs of his hosts. Conditions on the expeditions were extreme: winter temperatures sometimes fell below −50 °C, and Donner was at times forced to eat carrion to avoid starvation. In the summer of 1912 he fell seriously ill with a fever; a well-stocked medical kit saved his life. The prolonged hardships of the expeditions took a severe toll on his health and were likely the primary cause of his early death at the age of 46. His travelogue, Bland Samojeder i Sibirien åren 1911–1913, 1914 ('Among the Samoyeds in Siberia in the years 1911–1913, 1914'), was first printed in 1915.

He married Margareta von Bonsdorff in 1914; the couple had three sons, including the politician and film producer Jörn Donner and geologist Joakim Donner.

When fieldwork in Siberia became impossible, Donner turned his energy to Finland's independence movement.

=== Independence movement and Civil War ===
During World War I, Donner was active in the Jäger movement which was secretly sending young men from Finland to Germany to receive military training in preparation for an armed struggle for independence from Imperial Russia. Betrayed to the Okhrana in 1916, he fled to Sweden and lived there and in Imperial Germany as a refugee until 1918. During his exile in Stockholm, he kept his diary in the Kamassian language as a security precaution — one of the languages he had studied during his Siberian expeditions. He also served as acting legation secretary in Stockholm from 1917 to 1918. During the Finnish Civil War, Donner served as commander of the Terijoki crossing helping among others former minister of war, Sukhomlinov, and grand-duke Cyril Romanoff and his family to escape from revolutionary Russia. He was also active as second in command to the newly established Finnish Military Intelligence. From 1918 to 1919, he was titled Commander of the Finnish and Russian borderland. He was a close friend of General Mannerheim and wrote the first authoritative biography of Mannerheim.

=== Lapua movement and later career ===
In the 1920s and early 1930s, Donner was one of the more influential leaders of the far-right Lapua movement. He was editor-in-chief of the political journal Suunta from 1920 to 1922 and served as a presidential elector in 1931. Finland-Swedish by mother tongue, he expressed reservations about the persecution of Swedish speakers, which was commonly supported by conservative Finns in those decades.

He is buried in the Hietaniemi Cemetery in Helsinki.

== Works ==
- Bland samojeder i Sibirien åren 1911–1913, 1914 (1915)
- Itsenäisyytemme. Aktivistisia puheita ja kirjoituksia (1919)
- Sibiriska noveller (1919)
- Über die anlautenden labialen spiranten und verschlusslaute im samojedischen und uralischen (1920), his academic dissertation.
- Ethnological notes about the Yenisey-Ostyjak (in the Turukhansk region) (1933)
- Sibirien. Folk och forntid (1933) — considered his most significant scientific work of lasting value.
- Fältmarskalken. Friherre Mannerheim (1934)
- Kamassisches Wörterbuch nebst Sprachproben und Hauptzügen der Grammatik (1944), published posthumously, edited by A. J. Joki.
- Ketica. Materialien aus dem Ketischen oder Jenisseiostjakischen (1955), published posthumously, edited by Aulis J. Joki.
- As an editor, Donner also worked on H. Paasonen's Ostjakisches Wörterbuch (1926) and the multi-volume historical work Finlands frihetskrig (1921–1928).

== See also ==
- Donner family
