= Otto Donner =

Finnish linguist and politician

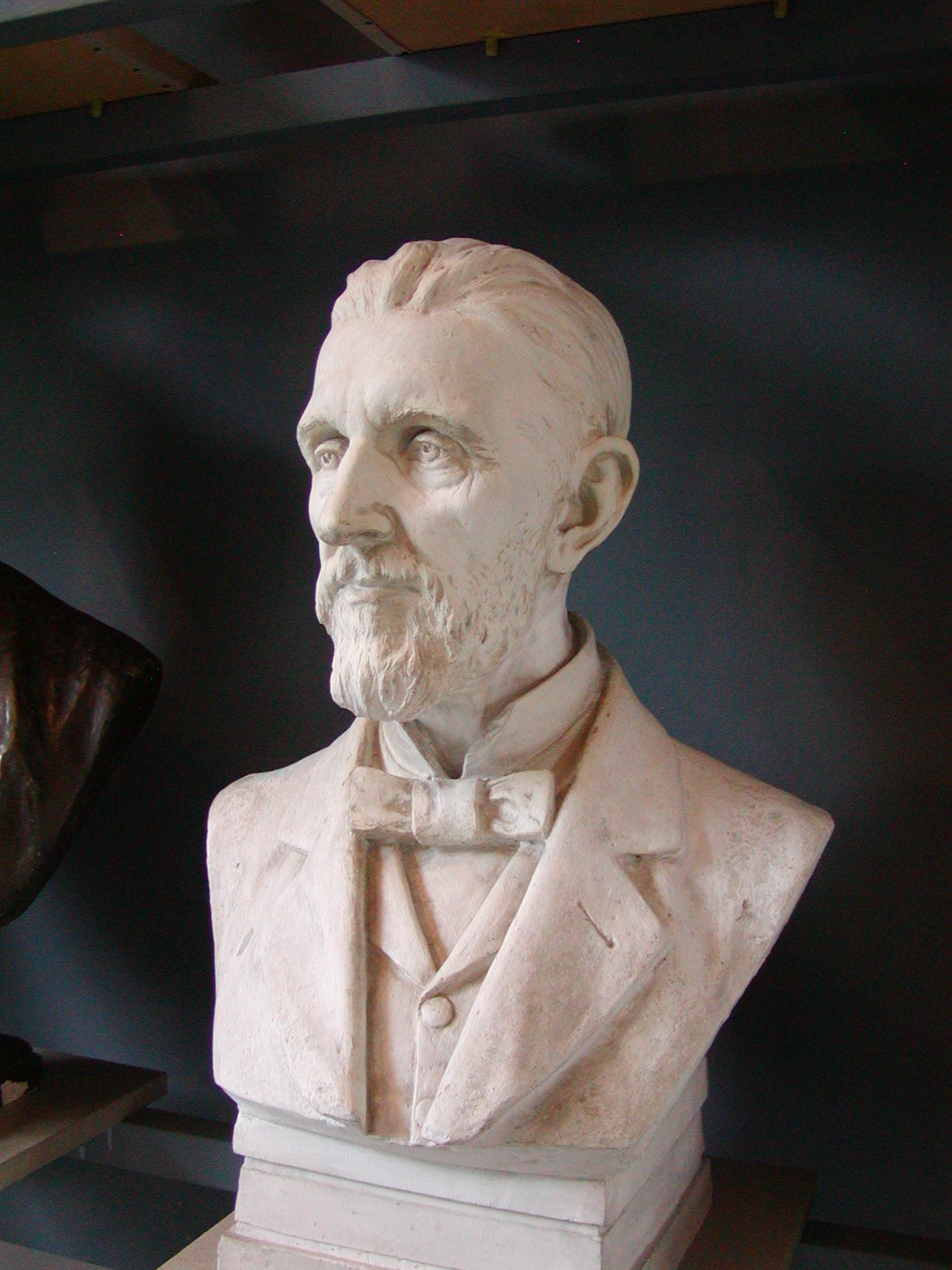
Bust of Otto Donner by Walter Runeberg

Otto Donner (15 December 1835, Kokkola – 17 September 1909, Helsinki) was a Finnish linguist and politician.

== Biography ==
He was professor of Sanskrit and Comparative Indo-European linguistics at the University of Helsinki, but also studied the Finno-Ugric languages. He was a member of the Diet of Finland 1877–1905, and minister of education 1905–1908. He was also influential in the founding of the Finno-Ugrian Society in 1883. He was elected as a member of the American Philosophical Society in 1886.

His mother tongue was Swedish, but he was a fennoman by conviction. He had many children: Ossian, Otto Jr., Uno, Kai, Harry and Eva Louise.

He is buried in the Hietaniemi Cemetery in Helsinki.

== See also ==
- Donner family
- Otto Donner in 375 humanists – 26 April 2015. Faculty of Arts, University of Helsinki.
