= List of ambassadors of Finland to the United States =

Ambassadors of Finland to the U.S.

Ambassador of Finland to the United States
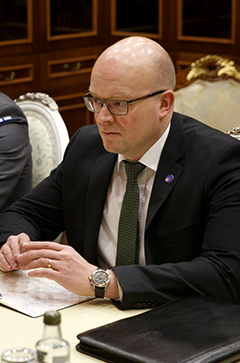
- Incumbent; Mikko Hautala since 2020
- Residence: Washington, D.C.
- Appointer: Prime Minister of Finland
- Inaugural holder: Armas Saastamoinen
- Formation: 1919

The Ambassador Extraordinary and Plenipotentiary of the Republic of Finland to the United States of America is in charge of Finland's diplomatic mission to the United States.

The Finnish Embassy is located at 3301 Massachusetts Avenue NW in the Embassy Row neighborhood of Washington, D.C.

== List of ambassadors ==
Representative	Years	Status
Armas Saastamoinen	1919–1921	Envoy
Leonard Åström	1921–1934	Envoy
Eero Järnefelt	1934–1938	Envoy
Hjalmar J. Procopé	1939–1944	Envoy
Kalle Jutila	1945–1951	Envoy
Johan Nykopp	1951–1954	Envoy
Johan Nykopp	1954–1958	Ambassador
Rafael Seppälä	1958–1965	Ambassador
Olavi Munkki	1965–1972	Ambassador
Leo Tuominen	1972–1977	Ambassador
Jaakko Iloniemi	1977–1983	Ambassador
Richard Müller	1983–1985	Ambassador
Paavo Rantanen	1986–1988	Ambassador
Jukka Valtasaari	1988–1996	Ambassador
Jaakko Laajava	1996–2001	Ambassador
Jukka Valtasaari	2001–2005	Ambassador
Pekka Lintu	2006–2011	Ambassador
Ritva Koukku-Ronde	2011–2015	Ambassador
Kirsti Kauppi	2015–2020	Ambassador
Mikko Hautala	2020–2024	Ambassador
Leena-Kaisa Mikkola	2024–present	

== See also ==
- Finland–United States relations
- List of diplomatic missions of Finland
- List of ambassadors of the United States to Finland
