= Finland–United States relations =

- Finland: United States

Diplomatic mission
- Embassy of Finland, Washington, D.C.: Embassy of the United States, Helsinki

Envoy
- Leena-Kaisa Mikkola: Howard W. Brodie

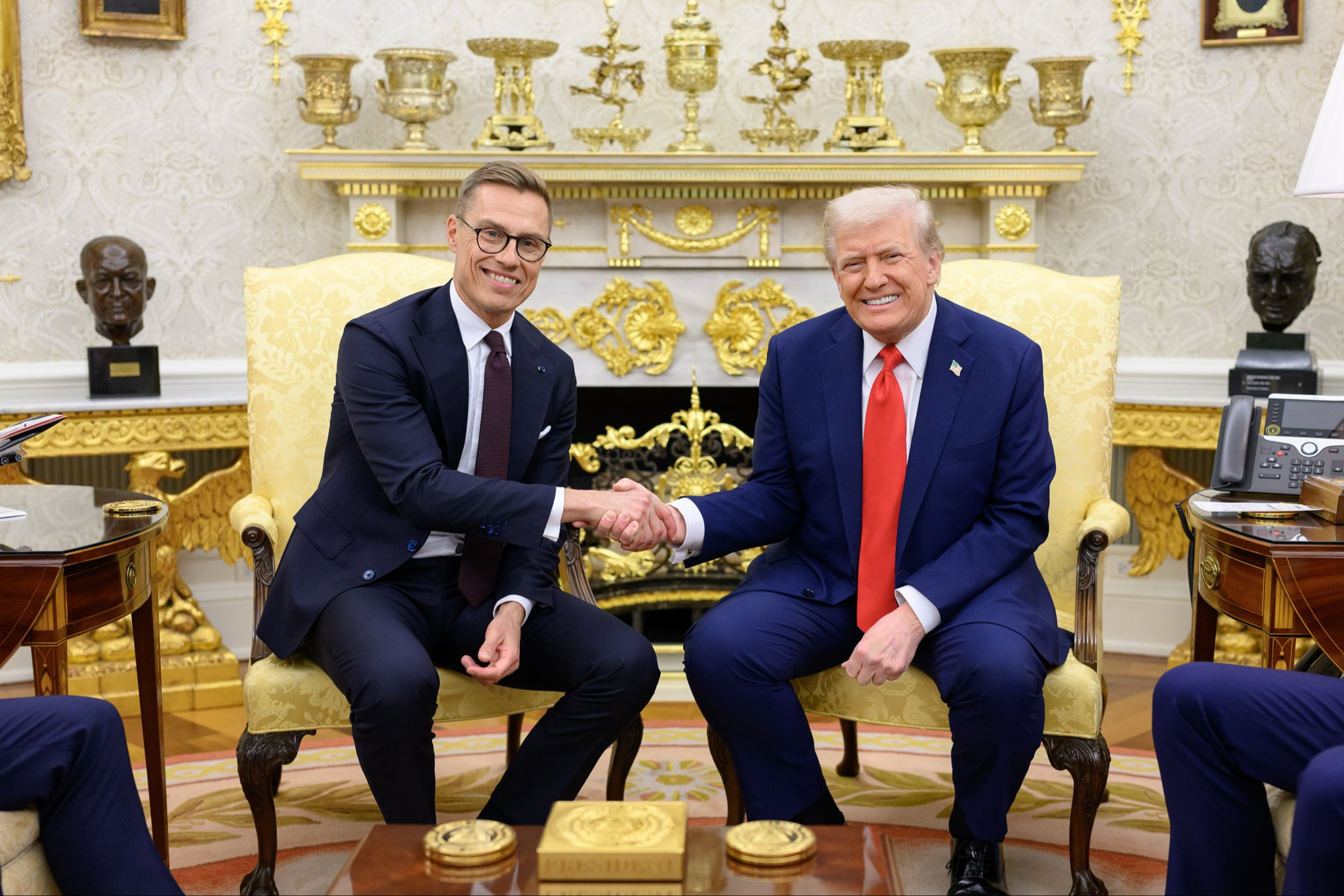
Finnish President Alexander Stubb with U.S. President Donald Trump in the Oval Office of the White House on 9 October 2025

The United States and Finland currently have good relations. The United States recognized Finland on May 7, 1919, after it declared independence in 1917, and officially established diplomatic relations in 1920. Due to World War II and Soviet pressure, relations were suspended between 1942 and 1945 before being raised to embassy level in 1954. Finland has been of strategic importance to the United States due to its position bordering the Soviet Union and later Russia, and after the end of the Cold War in 1991 Finland's shift to the West has led to warmer relations. There is significant trade activity, including military procurement, between the two countries.

The United States supported Finland's NATO membership during Finland's accession into NATO, which was finalized on 4 April 2023, and later that year, the two countries entered into a Defense Cooperation Agreement. Currently, both countries are members of NATO and the Arctic Council. The United States is an observer of the BEAC and CBSS while Finland is a member of them.

== History ==
=== The Kingdom of Sweden 1100-1809 ===
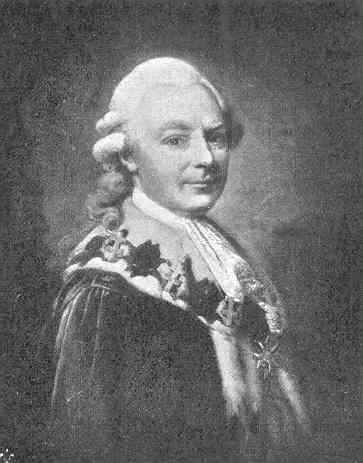
Gustaf Philip Creutz.

In 1776, an important Signer of the United States Declaration of Independence, John Morton, was the descendant of early Finnish pioneers who had founded New Sweden colony on the Delaware in 1638. Ethnic Finns, including “Forest Finns” who had been temporarily resettled to use slash-and-burn agriculture to clear parts of Sweden proper like Värmland, would account for the majority of permanent settlers who moved on to America: Finnish trailblazers transplanted log cabin architecture from Tavastia, Savo and Karelia, which would become icons of American frontier culture in the Thirteen Colonies and early United States, such as the Nothnagle Log House.

=== 2000–present ===
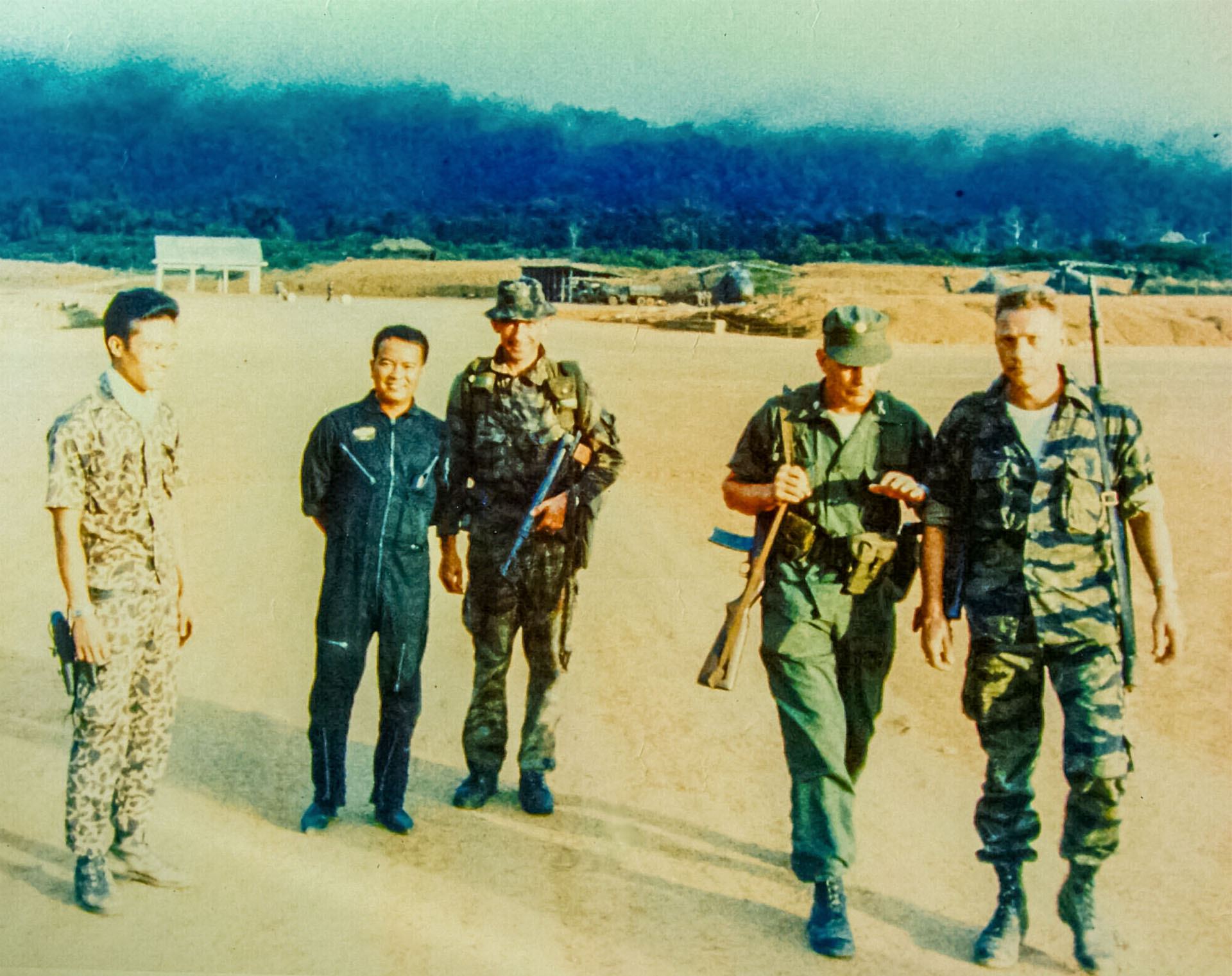
Finnish-born Lauri Törni (Larry Thorne) (right in the picture) when he served in the U.S. Army Special Forces in the 1960s.

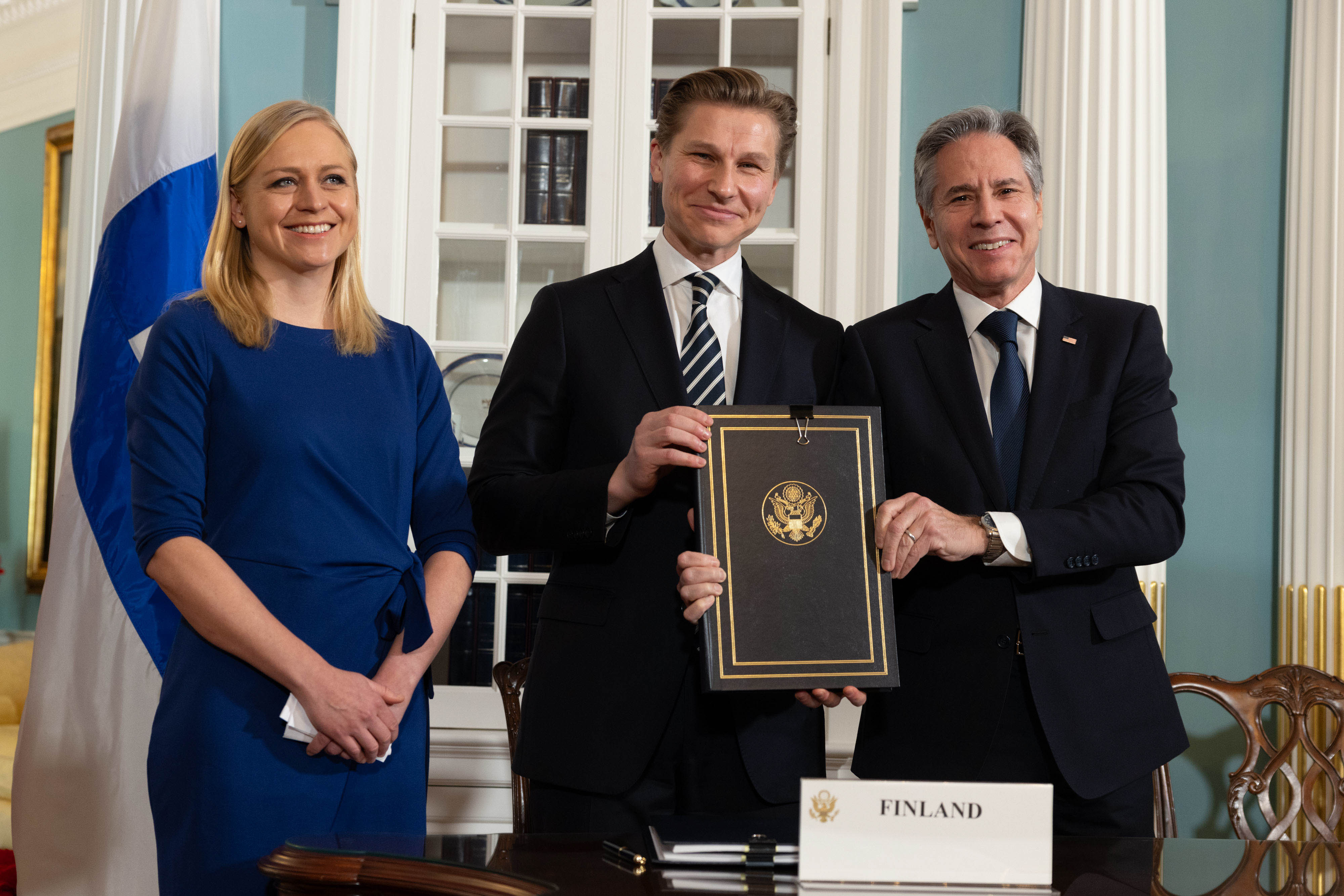
Secretary Antony J. Blinken participates in a Defense Cooperation Agreement Signing Ceremony with Finnish Foreign Minister Elina Valtonen and Finnish Defense Minister Antti Häkkänen at the Department of State in Washington, D.C., December 18, 2023.

Secretary Marco Rubio and Finnish Foreign Minister Elina Valtonen at signing Ceremony on a Critical Minerals Framework and a Technology Prosperity Deal at the Department of State, in Washington, D.C., October 29, 2026.

In 2003, Anneli Jäätteenmäki, leader of the Centre Party, won the Finnish parliamentary election. During the campaign, she accused the incumbent Prime Minister, Paavo Lipponen, of aligning neutral Finland with the United States in the Iraq War following a meeting with U.S. President George W. Bush. This accusation was based on confidential foreign ministry documents that suggested Finnish cooperation with the U.S.-led coalition, which many Finns considered an illegal war of aggression. Lipponen denied the claims, affirming Finland's support for the United Nations and its Secretary-General.

Jäätteenmäki's government, formed after the election, lasted only 63 days. She resigned amid allegations that she had misled Parliament regarding the manner in which she obtained the leaked documents. Jäätteenmäki received the documents from President Tarja Halonen’s adviser, Martti Manninen. The scandal, widely referred to in Finland as the "Iraq leak".

The number of travelers from the United States to Finland has been steadily increasing, amounting to between 200,000 and 380,000 visitors each year.

In 2019, Finnish Air Force and USSPACECOM signed a Memorandum of Understanding between Finland and the United States on space situational awareness cooperation in Helsinki, Finland. These agreements foster openness, predictability of space operations, and transparency for space domain awareness.

On August 3, 2022, the U.S. Senate unanimously approved Finland and Sweden's accession bids to join NATO. U.S. President Joe Biden approved the NATO membership of Finland and Sweden in August 2022.

On December 18, 2023, the US (represented by Antony Blinken) and Finland (represented by Antti Häkkänen and Elina Valtonen) signed a Defense Cooperation Agreement (DCA) in Washington, D.C.

The agreement regulates the presence of the US armed forces and their dependents on the territory of the Finland, as well as the presence and activities of US suppliers on the territory of the Finland.

President Joe Biden visited Helsinki on July 12, 2023, and met with Finnish President Sauli Niinistö and leaders of other Nordic nations, including Sweden, Norway, Denmark and Iceland. The purpose was to celebrate Finland joining the NATO.

During the second term of US President Donald Trump, Finnish President Alexander Stubb established a good personal rapport with Trump over their shared interest in golf, with the United States committing to purchase icebreakers from Finland in March 2025. To this trust experts attributed the American invitation of the Finnish President to participate in talks at the August 2025 White House Multilateral Meeting on Ukraine, making Finland the only small country represented at the high-stakes summit in Washington alongside the leaders of France, Germany, Italy, the UK, Ukraine, the EU, and NATO.

The increasing importance of close relations between Finland and the United States was further evidenced by the announcement that a third meeting between Presidents Stubb and Trump - for the first time accompanied by Finnish Prime Minister Petteri Orpo - was scheduled to take place over a two-day visit by Finnish officials to meet with American officials to discuss a variety of topics at the White House in October 2025.

The United States Ambassador to Finland is Howard Brodie. The current Finnish Ambassador to the United States is Leena-Kaisa Mikkola, who began her posting in September 2024.

On October 29, 2026, the US (represented by Marco Rubio) and Finland (represented by Elina Valtonen) signed Technology Prosperity Deal (TPD) on technology cooperation and a Critical Minerals Framework document to strengthen collaboration on critical minerals in Washington, DC.

== Trade ==
In 2024, the United States' share of Finland's exports was about 9.6% and of imports 5.0%, and the United States was Finland's third largest export country and sixth largest import country.

Finland's exports to the U.S. in 2024 were around $10.1 billion, including chemicals, machinery (except electrical), petroleum and coal products, paper, and electronic products. Meanwhile, U.S. exports to Finland were about $4.5 billion, mainly oil and gas, electronics, chemicals, minerals, and transportation equipment.

== Visits of heads of state ==
During 1975–2023 six presidents of the United States have visited Finland. Of them, George H. W. Bush visited Finland twice. Basic facts of these visits are given in the table below. In some cases, the table contains only the arrival date.

In addition to this, Barack Obama visited Finland during 26–27 September 2019. He gave a talk at the Nordic Business Forum.

Visits of United States Presidents to Finland
No	Year	Date	Visitor	Host	Reason for the visit
1.	1975	29 July	Gerald Ford	Urho Kekkonen	Attended CSCE Summit
2.	1988	26–29 May	Ronald Reagan	Mauno Koivisto	Stop on the way to Moscow to meet with Mikhail Gorbachev
3.	1990	8 September	George H. W. Bush	Mauno Koivisto	Meeting with Mikhail Gorbachev in Helsinki
4.	1992	8 July	George H. W. Bush	Mauno Koivisto	Attended CSCE Summit
5.	1997	20 March	Bill Clinton	Martti Ahtisaari	Meeting with Boris Yeltsin in Helsinki
6.	2018	15–16 July	Donald Trump	Sauli Niinistö	Meeting with Vladimir Putin in Helsinki
7.	2023	13–14 July	Joe Biden	Sauli Niinistö	Meeting with Niinistö; Meeting with Nordic prime ministers

Visits of Finland Presidents to United States
No	Year	Date	Visitor	Host	Reason for the visit
1.	1961	16–18 October	Urho Kekkonen	John F. Kennedy	Meeting with John F. Kennedy
2.	1970	23–25 July	Urho Kekkonen	Richard Nixon	Meeting with Richard Nixon
3.	1970	24 October	Urho Kekkonen	Richard Nixon	Attended White House dinner on 25th Anniversary of the U.N
4.	1976	3–5 August	Urho Kekkonen	Gerald R. Ford	Meeting with Gerald R. Ford
5.	1983	24–27 September	Mauno Koivisto	Ronald Reagan	Meeting with Ronald Reagan
6.	1991	6–8 May	Mauno Kivisto	George H. W. Bush	Meeting with George H. W. Bush
7.	1994	8–10 November	Martti Ahtisaari	Bill Clinton	Meeting with Bill Clinton
8.	1999	16–17 December	Martti Ahtisaari	Bill Clinton	Meeting with Bill Clinton
9.	2000	28 April	Tarja Halonen	Bill Clinton	Meeting with Bill Clinton
10.	2002	16 April	Tarja Halonen	George W. Bush	Meeting with George W. Bush
11.	2016	13 May	Sauli Niinistö	Barack Obama	Meeting with Barack Obama; Meeting with Nordic prime ministers
12.	2017	28 August	Sauli Niinistö	Donald Trump	Meeting with Donald Trump
13.	2019	1–3 October	Sauli Niinistö	Donald Trump	Meeting with Donald Trump
14.	2022	4 March	Sauli Niinistö	Joe Biden	Meeting with Joe Biden
15.	2022	19 May	Sauli Niinistö	Joe Biden	Meeting with Joe Biden; Meeting with Swedish prime minister Magdalena Andersson
16.	2023	6–10 March	Sauli Niinistö	Joe Biden	Meeting with Joe Biden
17.	2024	9–11 July	Alexander Stubb	Joe Biden	Meeting with Joe Biden attend 2024 NATO summit
18.	2025	29 March	Alexander Stubb	Donald Trump	Meeting with Donald Trump in Mar-a-Lago
19.	2025	18 August	Alexander Stubb	Donald Trump	Meeting with Donald Trump and European leaders at the White House
20.	2025	9–10 October	Alexander Stubb; Petteri Orpo	Donald Trump	Meeting with Donald Trump and other top U.S. officials at the White House

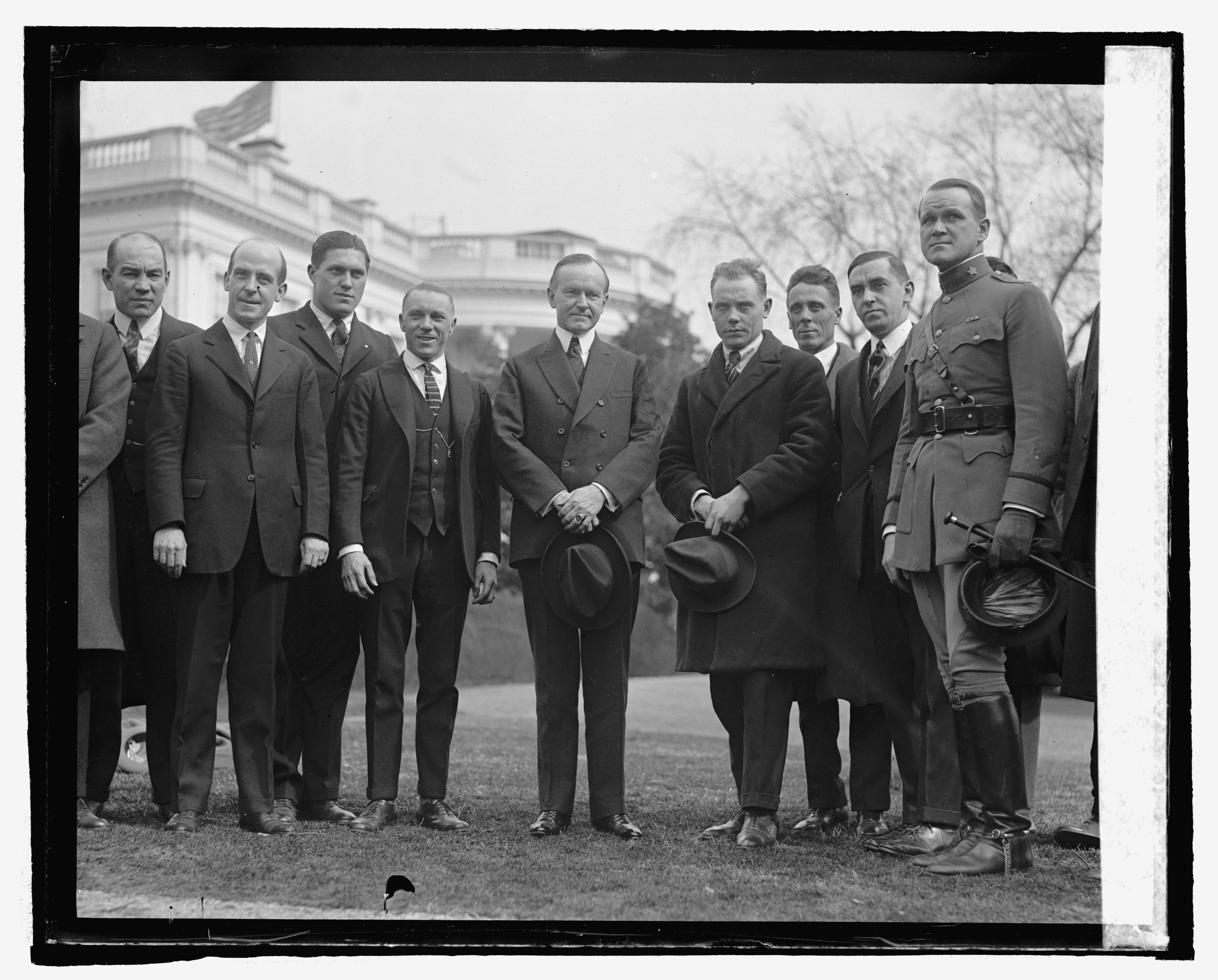
Joie Ray, President Calvin Coolidge, and Paavo Nurmi at the White House in 1925.

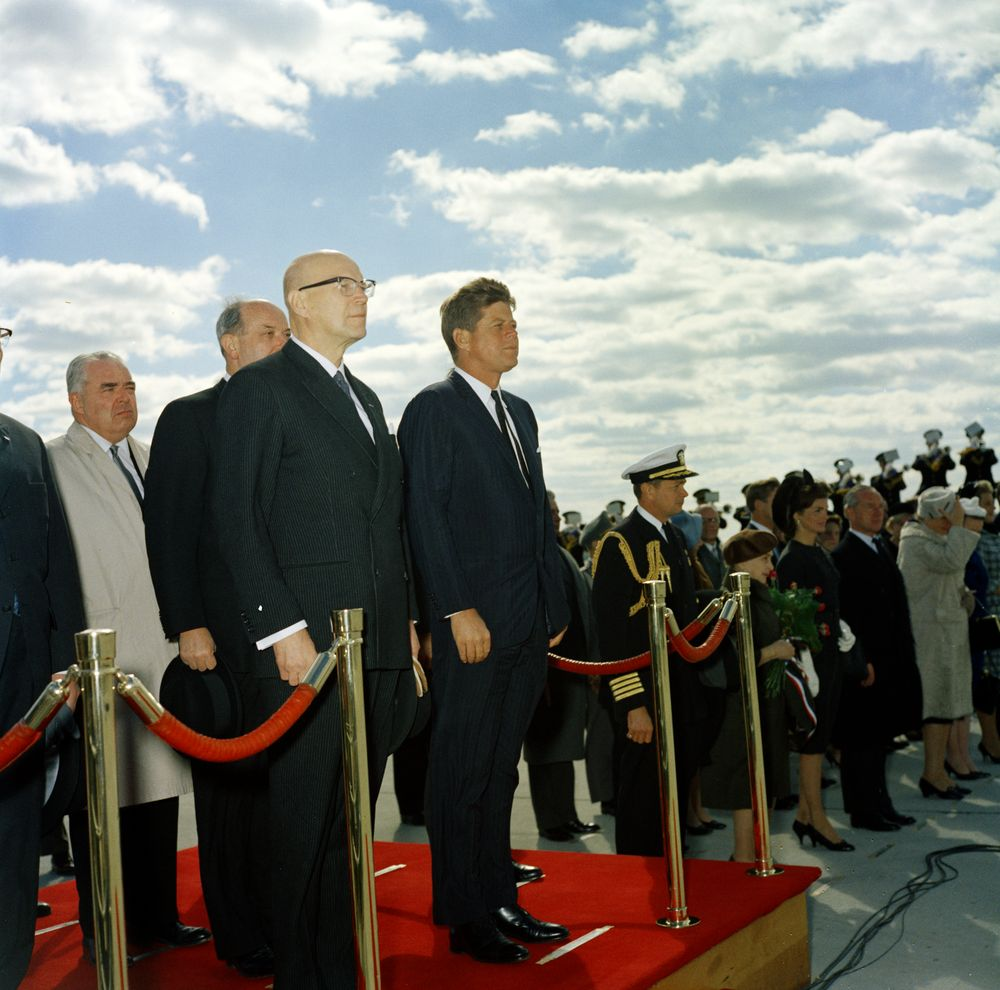
Presidents Urho Kekkonen and John F. Kennedy in 1961.

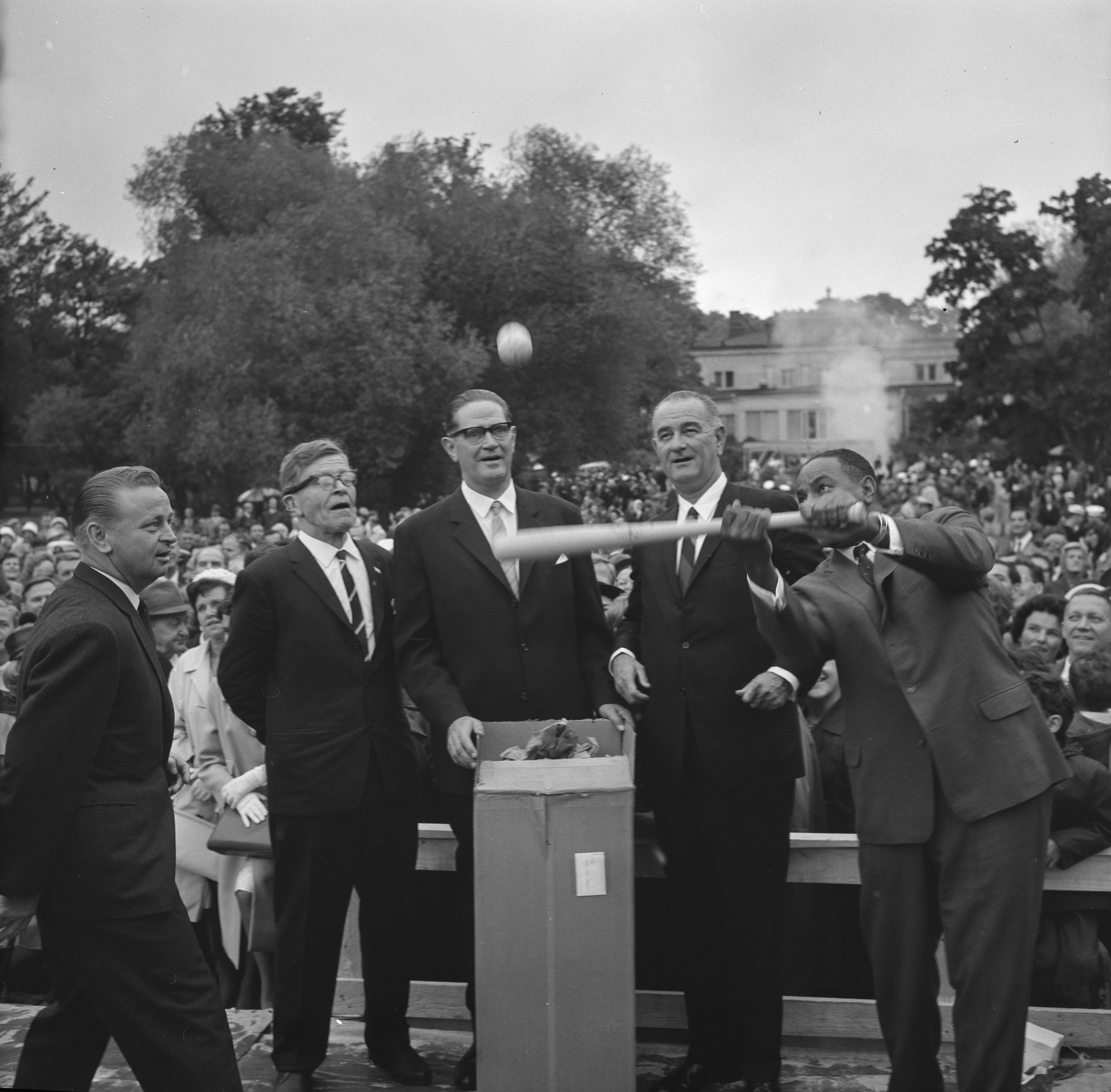
US Vice President Lyndon B. Johnson's visit in 1963. US Ambassador to Finland Carl Rowan (right) hits the ball with a baseball bat and a founder of Pesäpallo Lauri Pihkala (left) in Kaivopuisto, Helsinki.

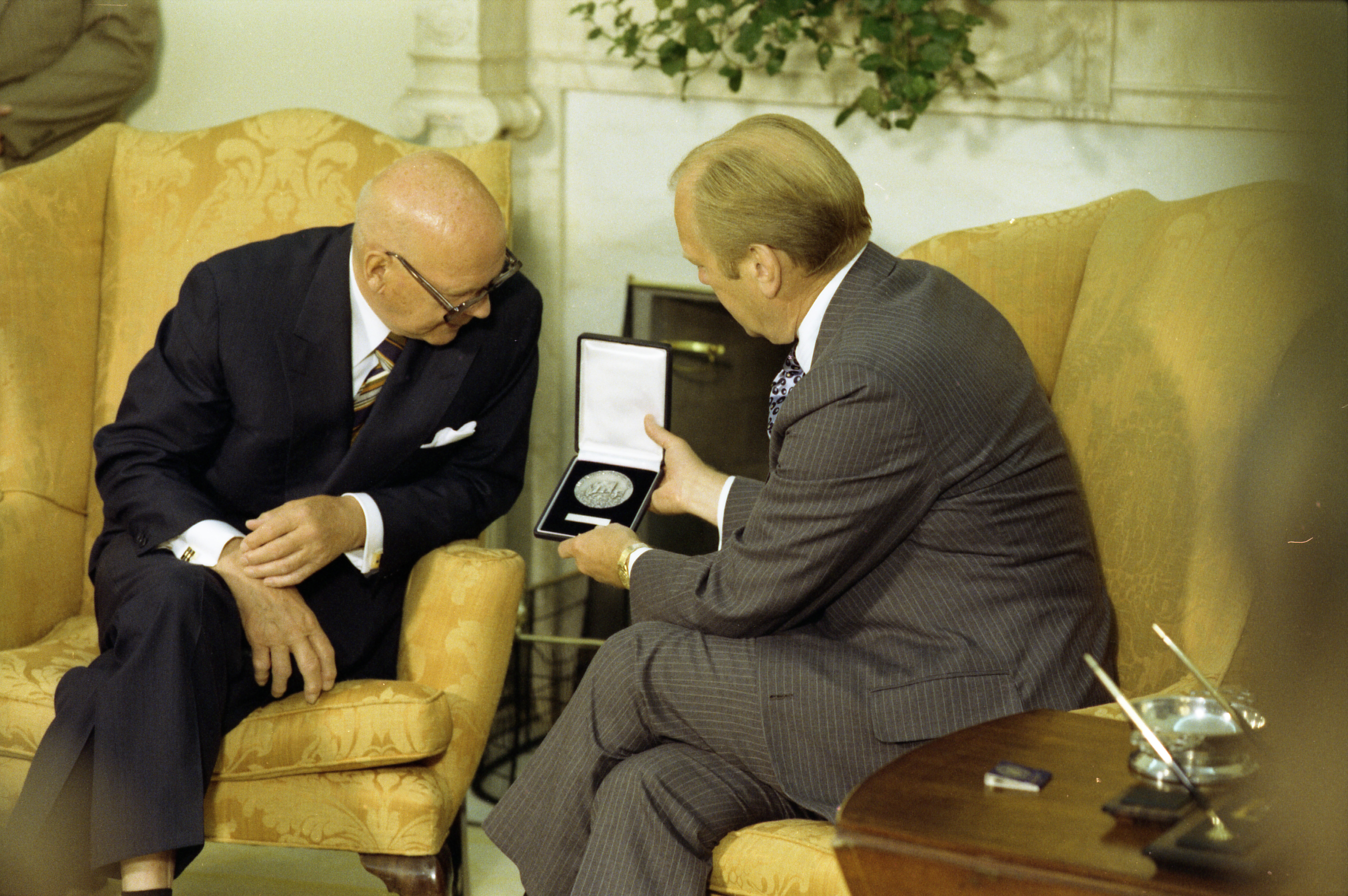
President of Finland Urho Kekkonen and President of the United States of America Gerald R. Ford in 1976.

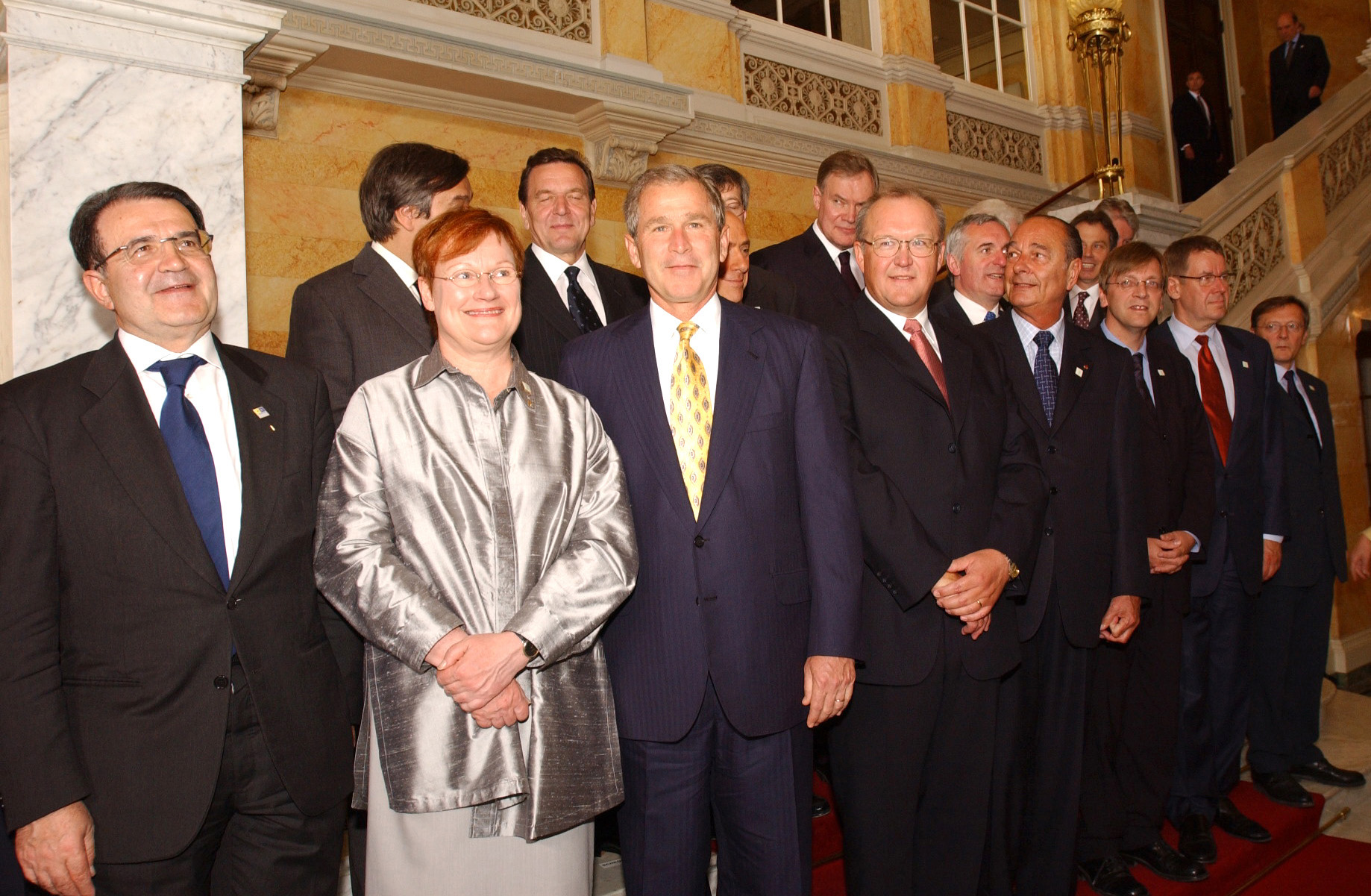
President of Finland Tarja Halonen and President of the United States George W. Bush in 2001 EU US Summit.

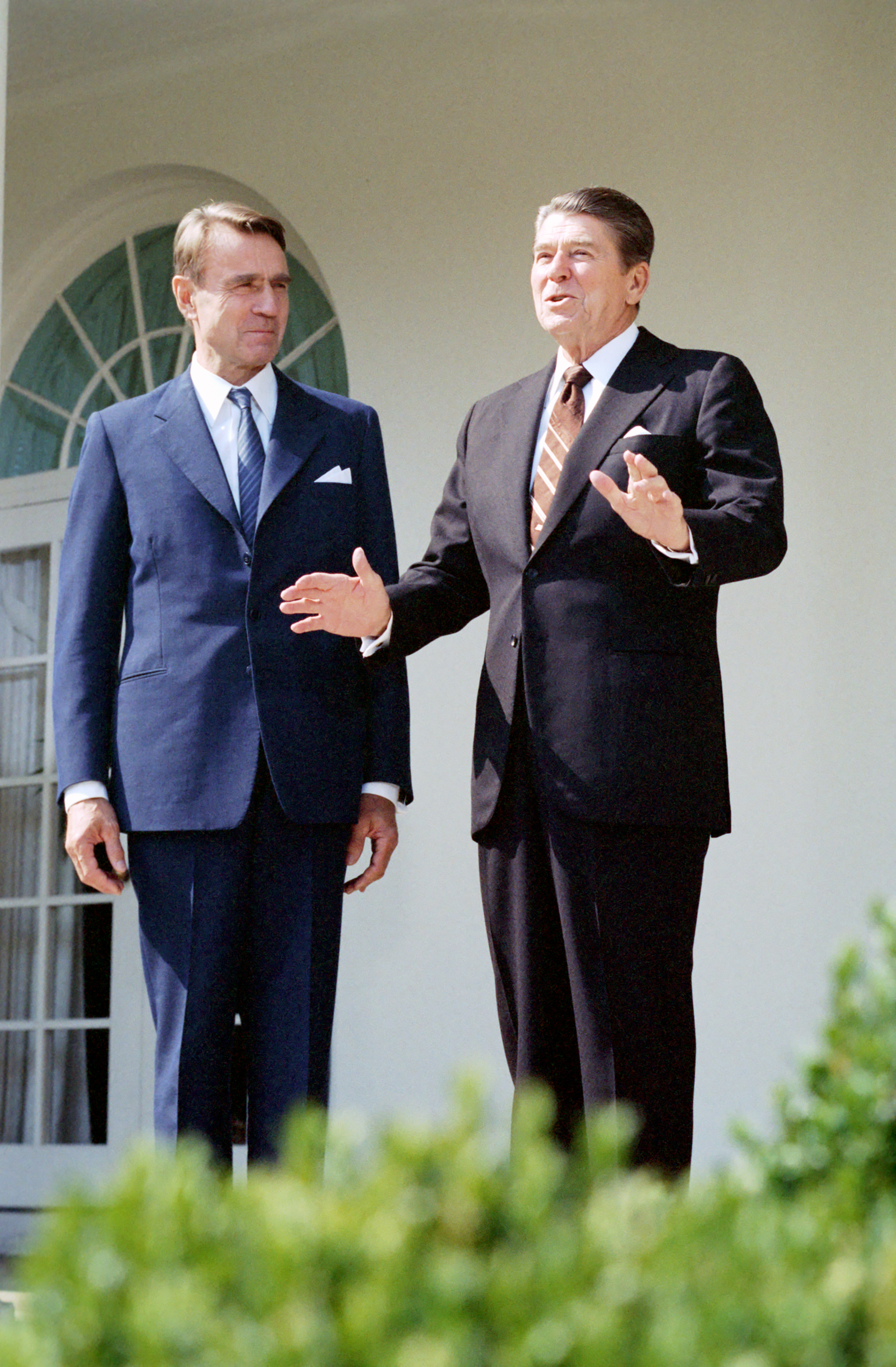
Presidents Ronald Reagan and Mauno Koivisto in The Rose Garden 1983.

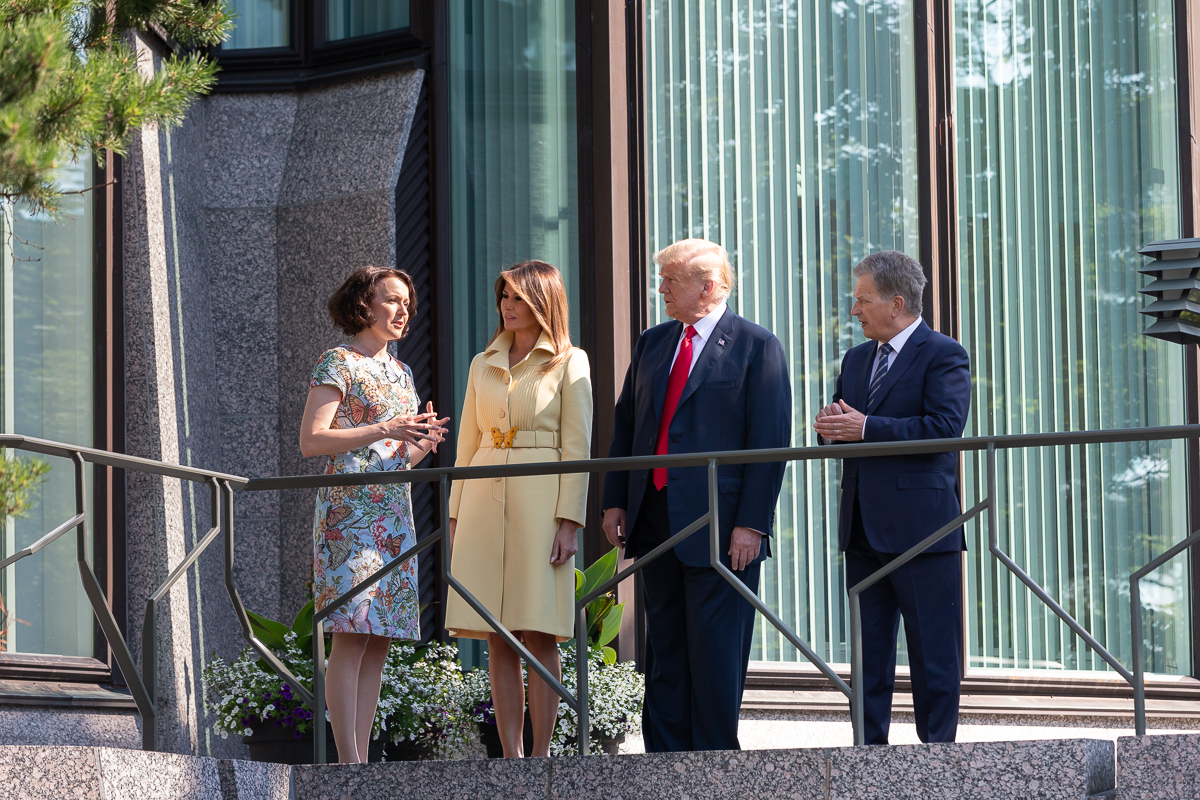
President Donald Trump and First Lady

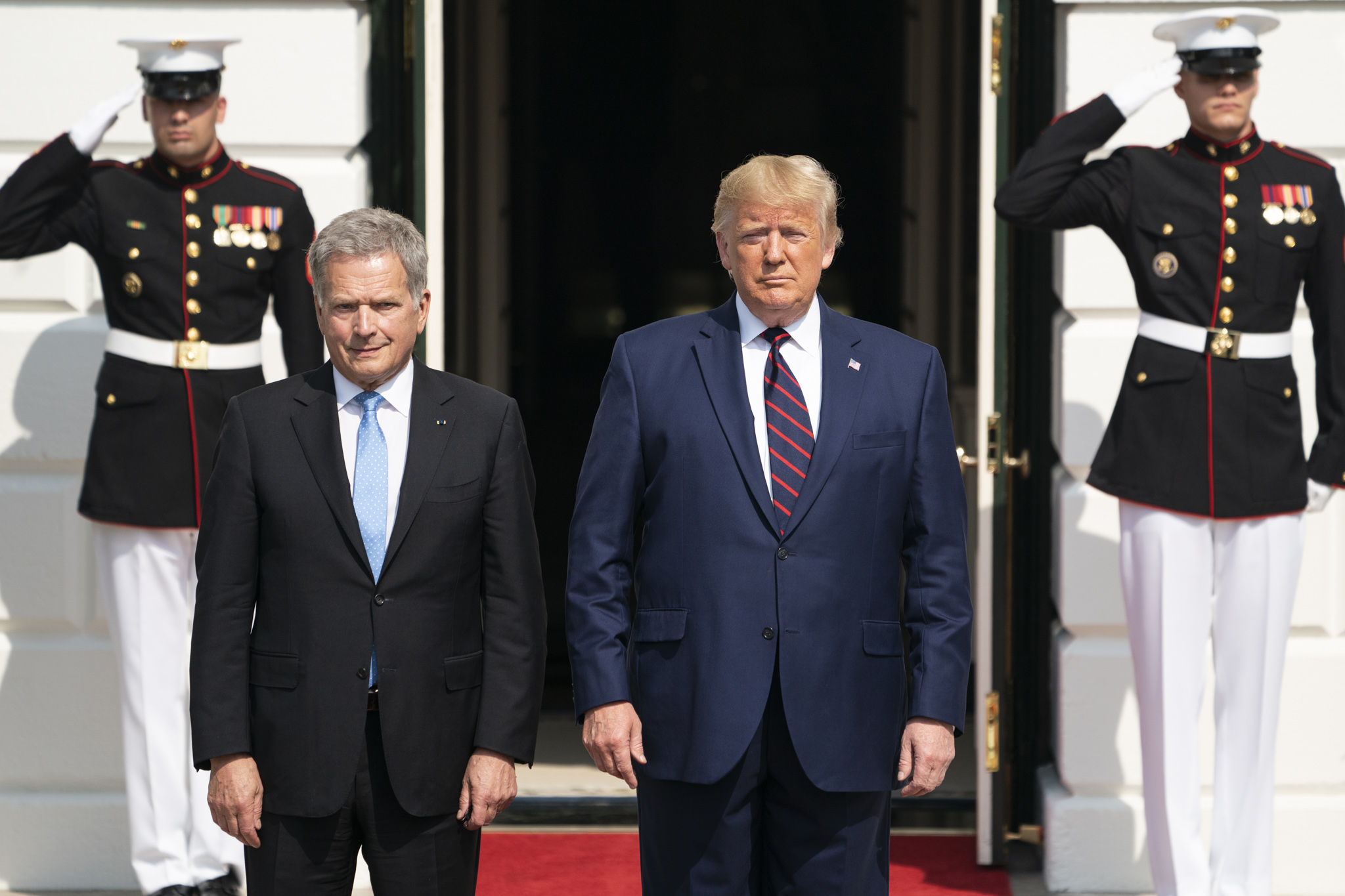
President of Finland Sauli Niinistö and President of the United States Donald Trump.

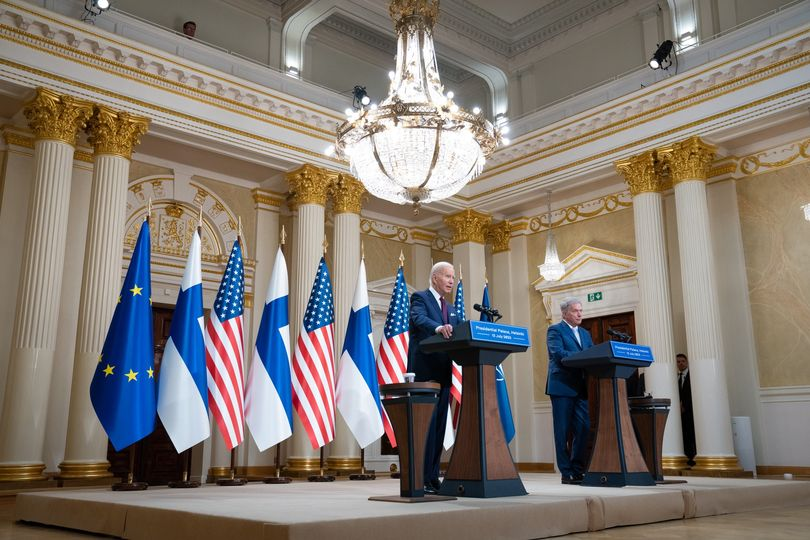
Presidents Joe Biden and Sauli Niinistö in press Conference at the Presidential Palace of Finland in Helsinki, Finland in July 2023.

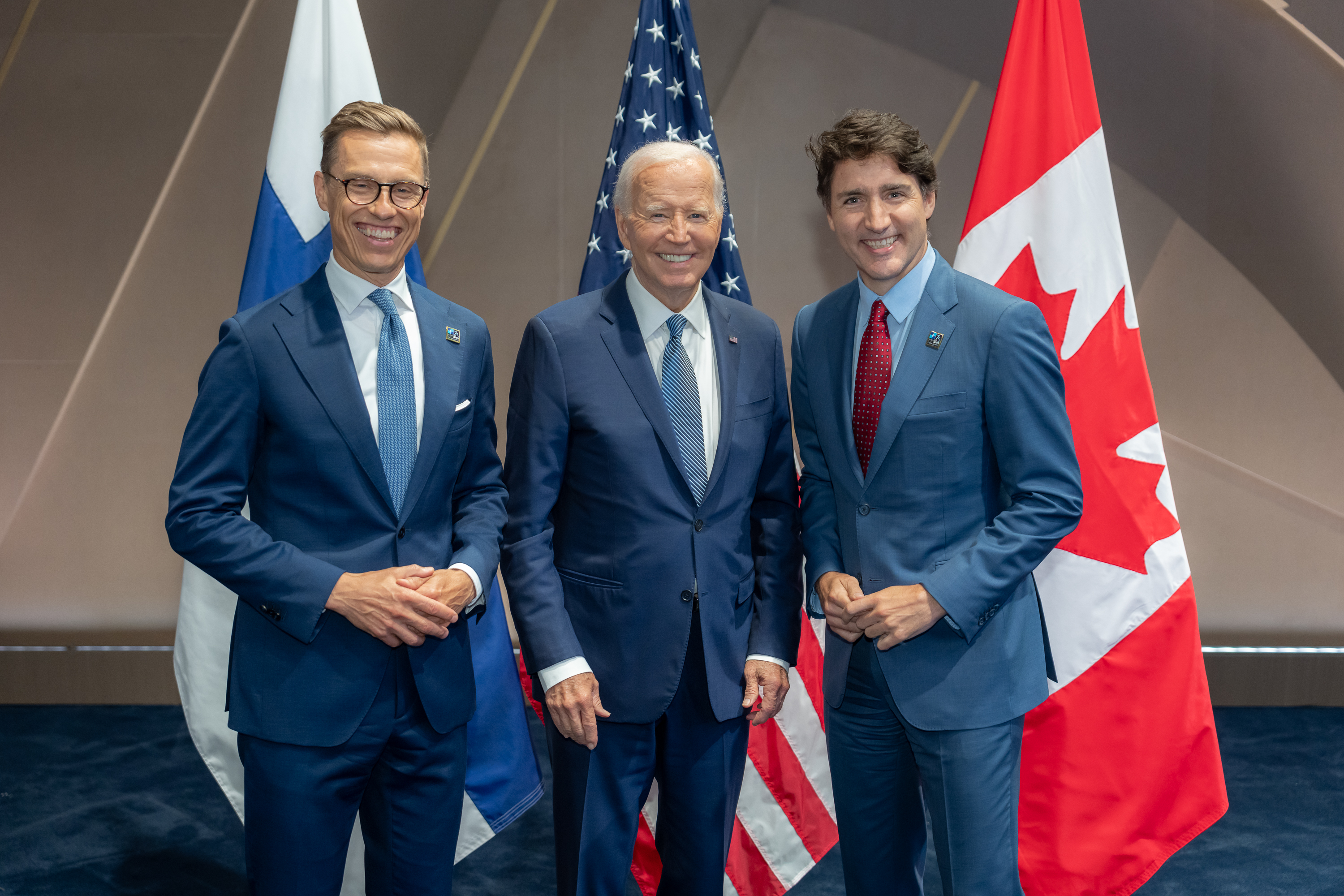
President of Finland Alexander Stubb meets with U.S. president Joe Biden and Canadian prime minister Justin Trudeau at the 2024 NATO summit in Washington, D.C., 10 July 2024.

== Resident diplomatic missions ==
of Finland in the United States

- Washington, D.C. (Embassy)
- Houston (Consulate-General)
- Los Angeles (Consulate-General)
- New York City (Consulate-General)

of the United States in Finland

- Helsinki (Embassy)

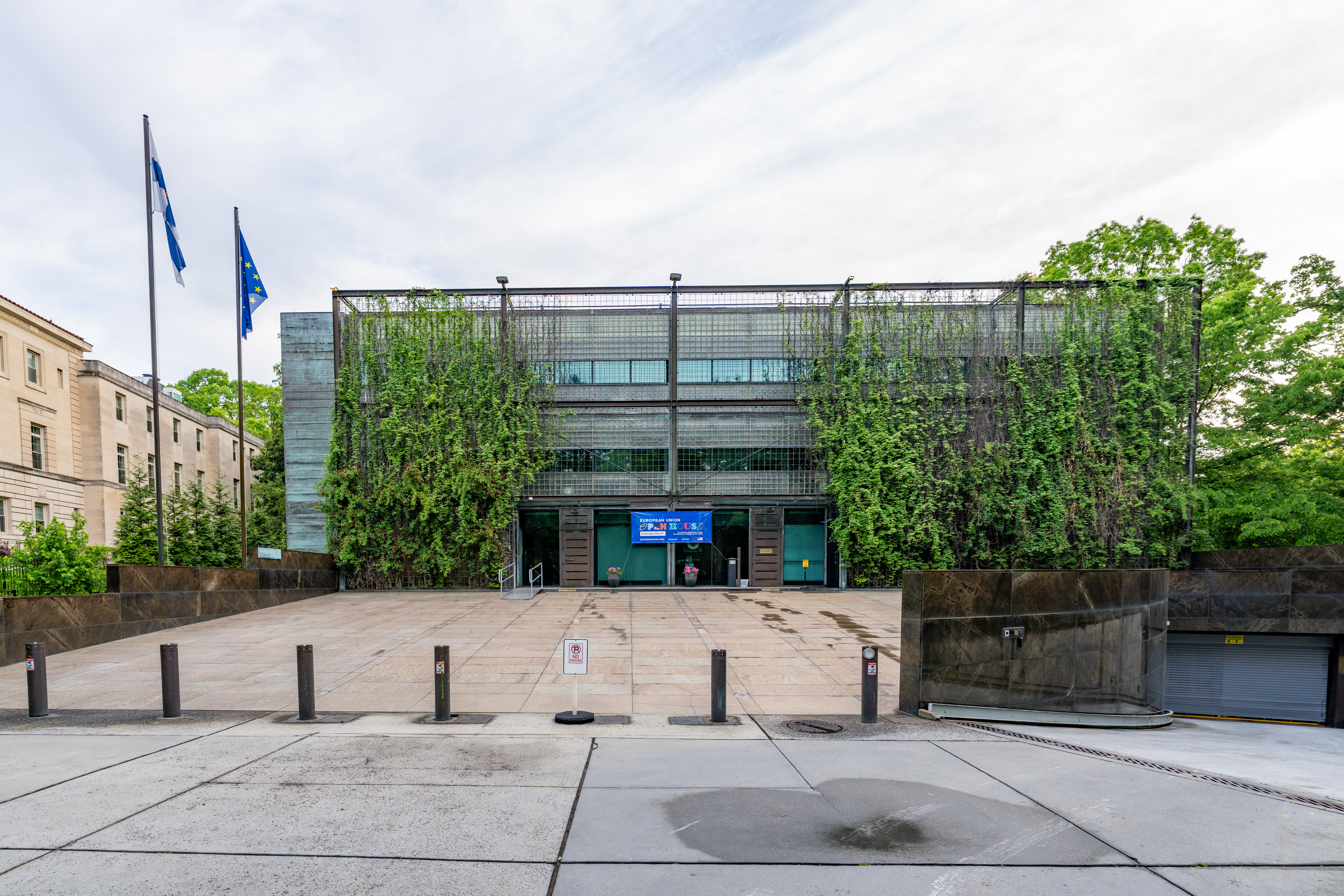
Embassy of Finland in Washington, D.C.

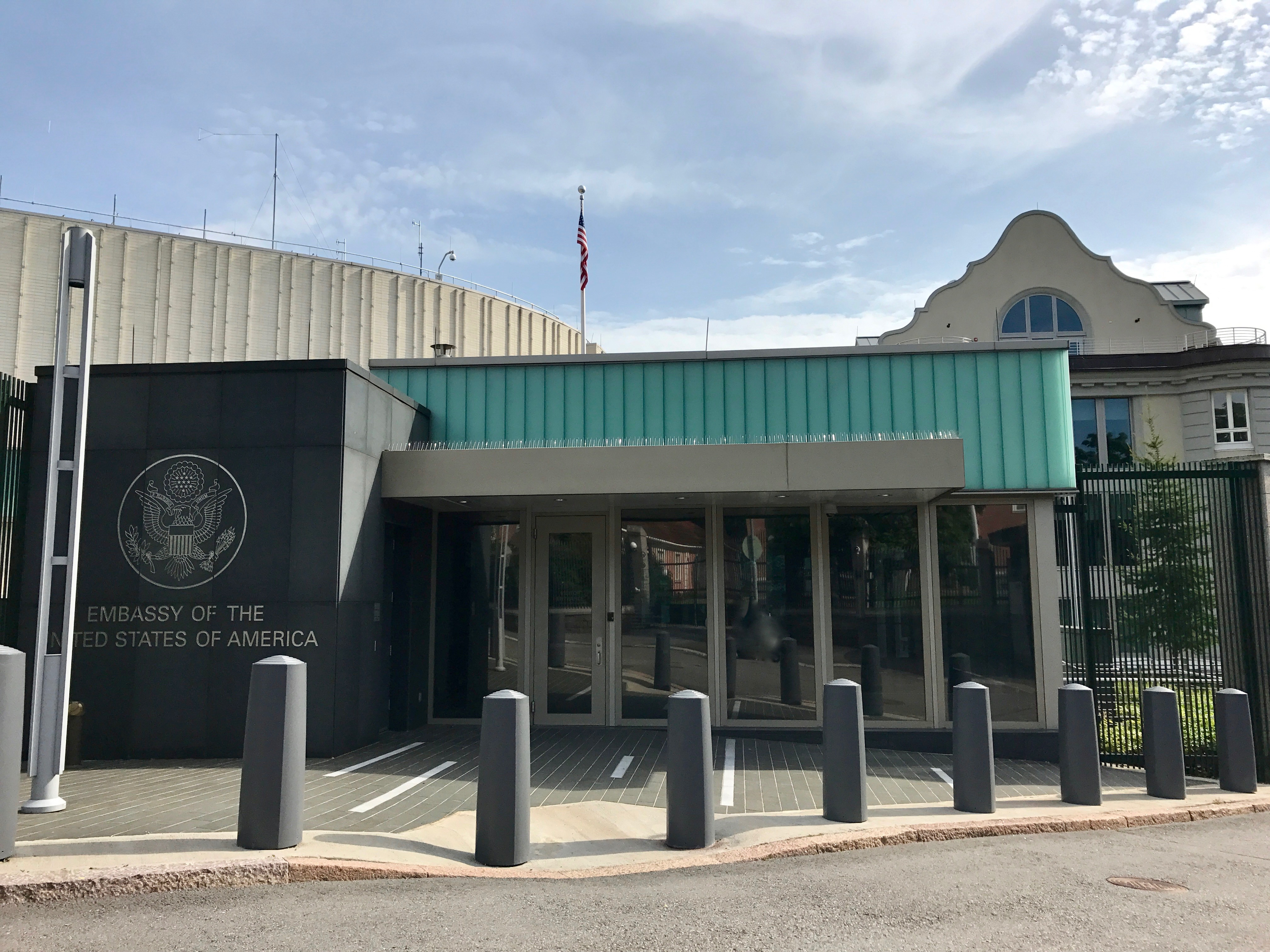
Embassy of the United States in Helsinki

== Public opinion ==
According to the Meridian International Center and Gallup's U.S.-Global Leadership Project, as of 2012, 48% of Finnish people approved of U.S. leadership, with 34% disapproving and 18% uncertain.

== Arctic relations ==
Finland–United States relations on Arctic issues are strong. Addressing these issues is normally done through the Arctic Council, as both countries believe it to be the leading way of cooperation on Arctic issues.

At the 2024 NATO summit, on 11 July 2024, it was decided that the United States, Canada and Finland are to form the ICE Pact, in which Finland will serve as the majority builder of icebreaker vessels.

In October 2025, Alexander Stubb and Donald Trump sign a memorandum of understanding about "icebreaker cooperation".

== Cultural exchange ==
The League of Finnish-American Societies (Finnish: Suomi-Amerikka Yhdistysten Liitto) is a non-profit organization promoting cultural exchange between countries which operates in Finland. It has around 30 chapters in Finland, e.g. those in Helsinki, Turku, Oulu and Kuopio.

Finnish Americans celebrate FinnFest USA, a festival held annually in the United States on the occasion of midsummer.

== Gallery ==
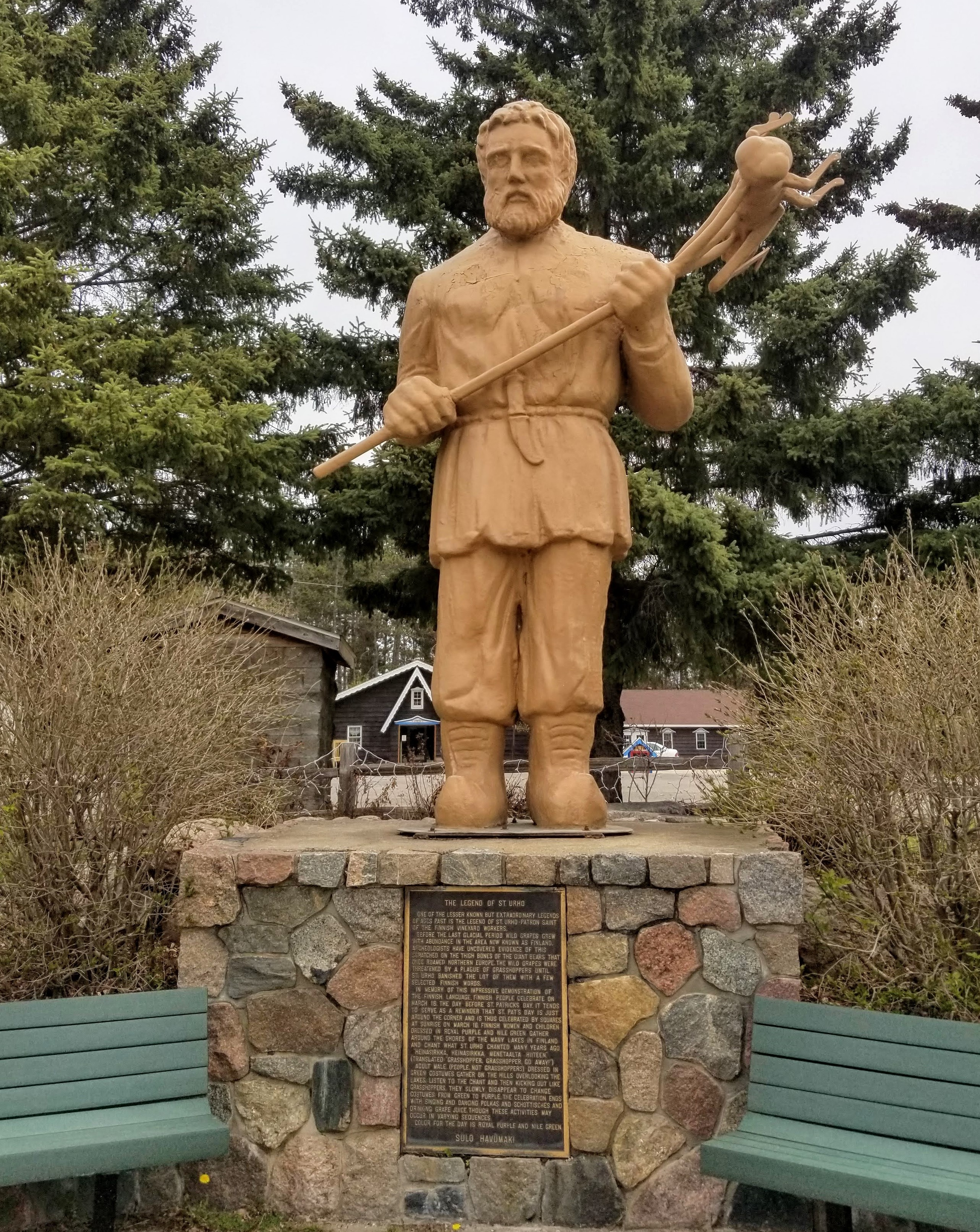
St. Urho, Saint of Finland

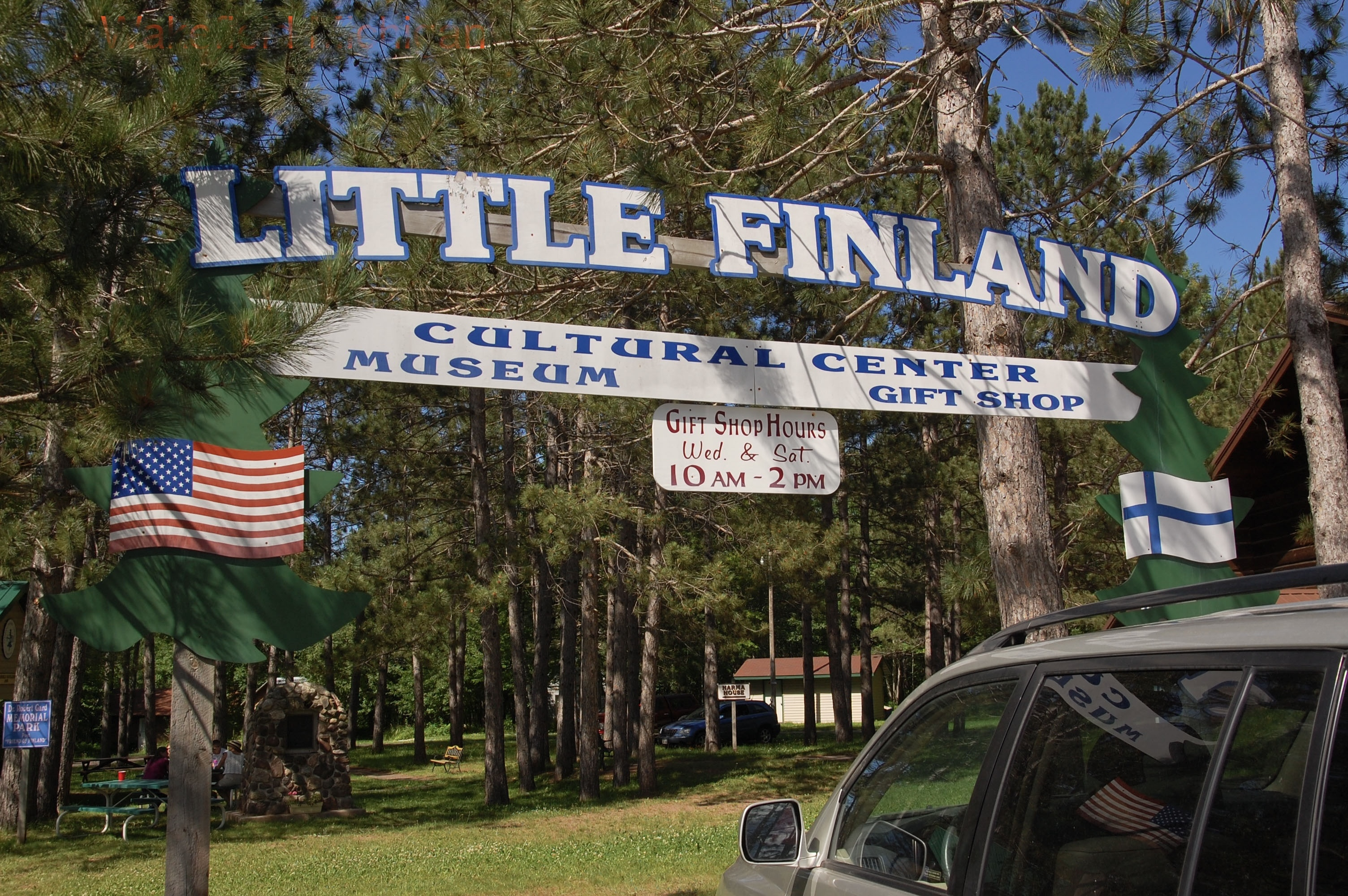
A town of Finnish immigrants in Northern Michigan

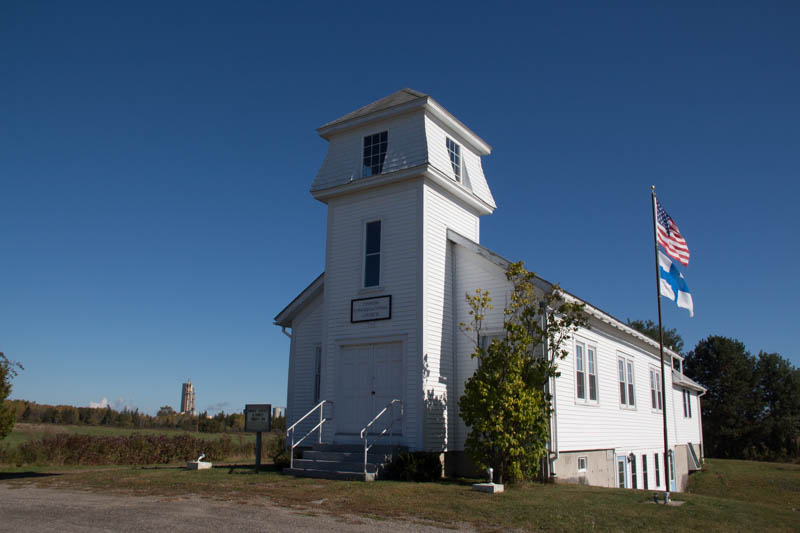
Finnish Congregational Church and Parsonage in South Thomaston, Maine, United States

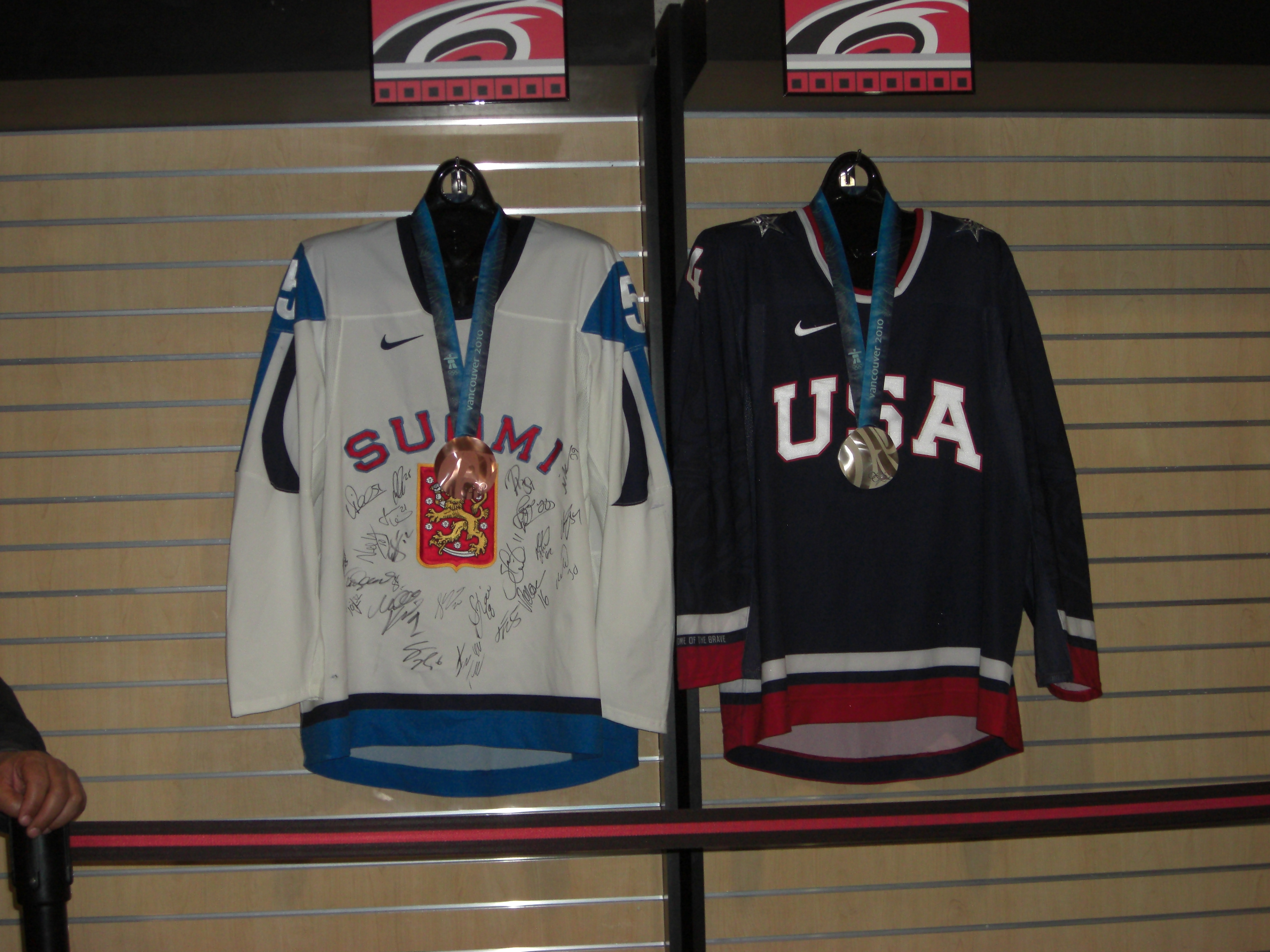
Finland and USA are very at the same level in ice hockey and the matches between the two have always been entertaining

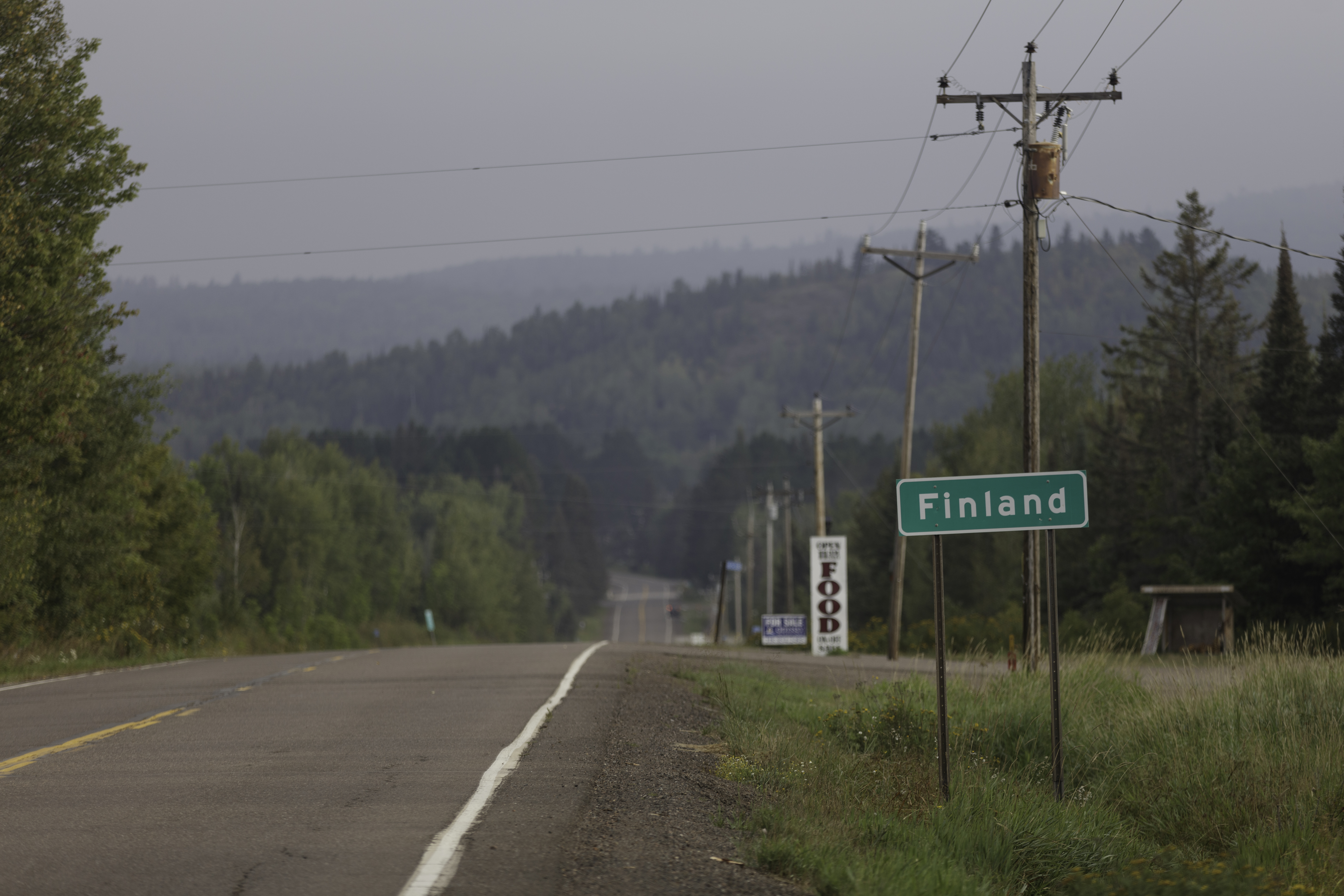
Finland, Minnesota is a village founded by immigrants of Finnish origin

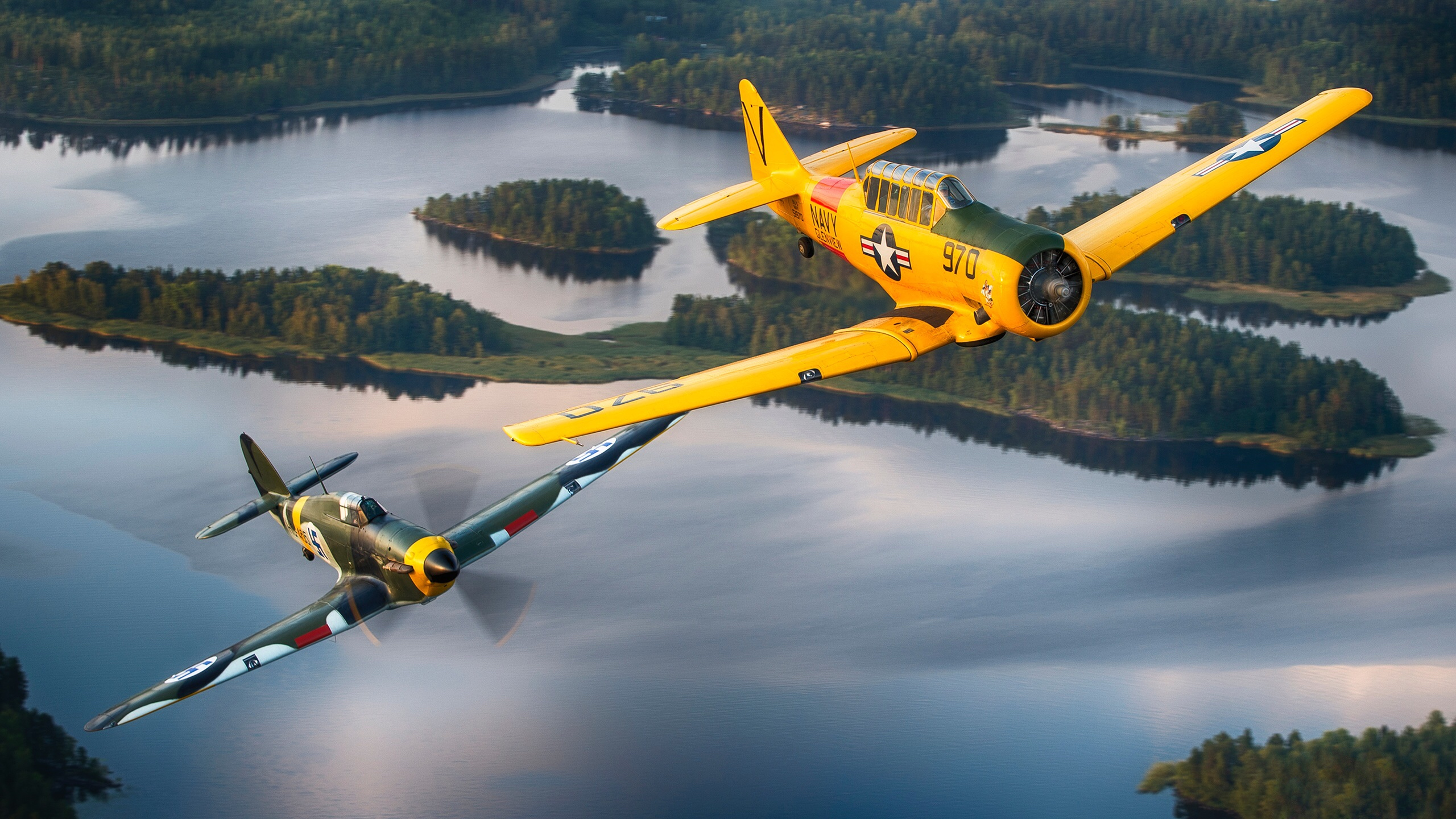
Finnish Air Force Hawker Hurricane warbird with US Navy T-6 Texan warbird in Finland

== See also ==
- Foreign relations of Finland
- Foreign relations of the United States
- US–EU relations
- NATO-EU relations
- Agreement on Defense Cooperation between Finland and the United States of America
- Finnish Americans
