= Anu Saarela =

Finnish lawyer and diplomat (born 1958)

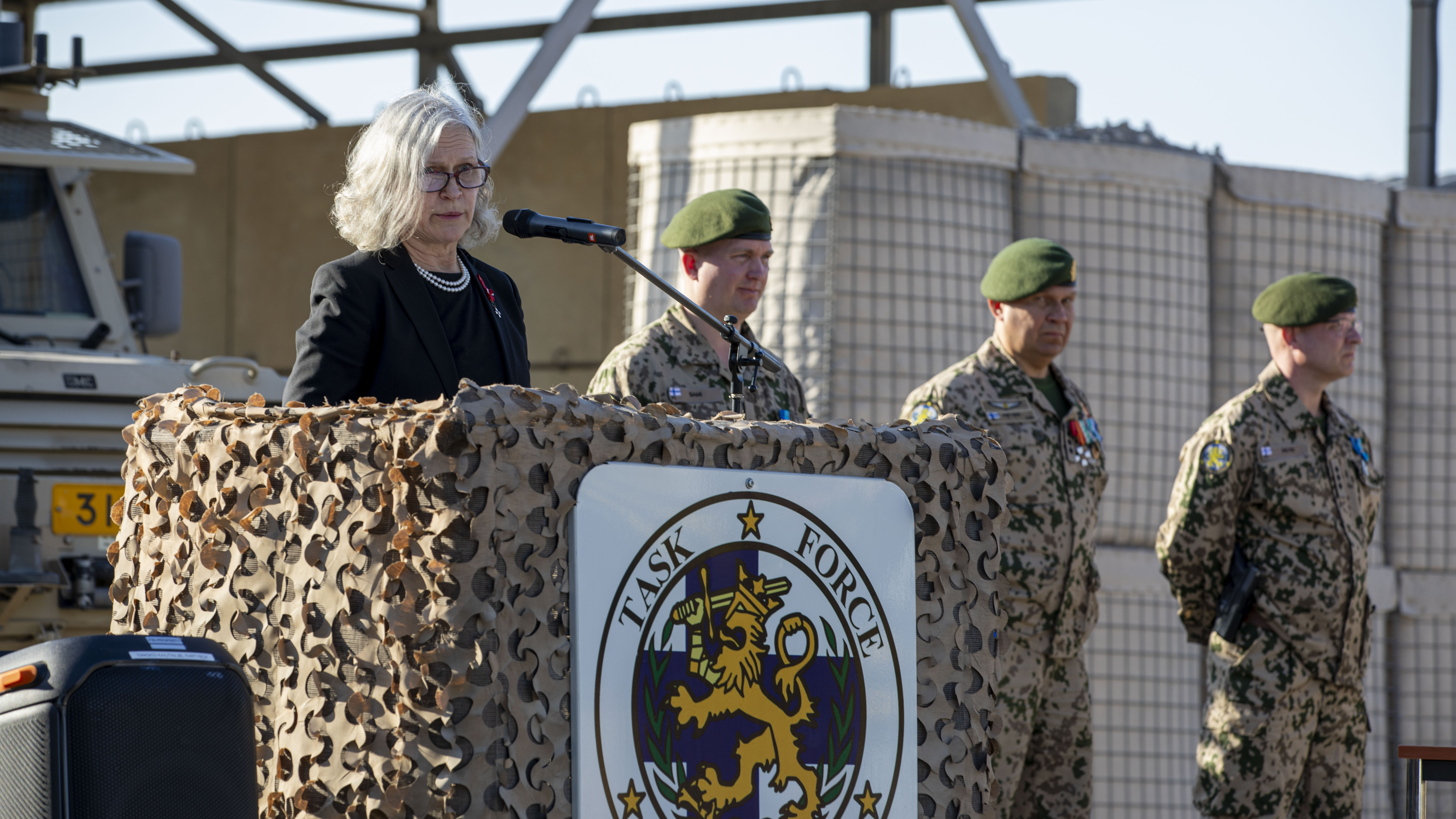
Anu Saarlea on December 6, 2024

Anu-Maija Saarela (born 29 December 1958 in Multia) is a Finnish lawyer and diplomat. She served as the ambassador of Finland to Iraq during 23 March 2023 – 1 September 2025.

Saarela came to the Ministry for Foreign Affairs in 1987. She has previously worked in the Foreign Ministry at the political, commercial, administrative and legal department. Since 2009, she served as the Head of the Department of International Law at the Ministry of Justice. In other foreign missions, Saarela has been in Berlin, Tokyo, Stockholm, Washington and Lagos. She was previously the Ambassador of Finland to Tel Aviv during 2016–2018. Prior to Tel Aviv, from 2012 she was the Ambassador in Nicosia, Cyprus.
