= Kirsti Kauppi =

Finnish diplomat

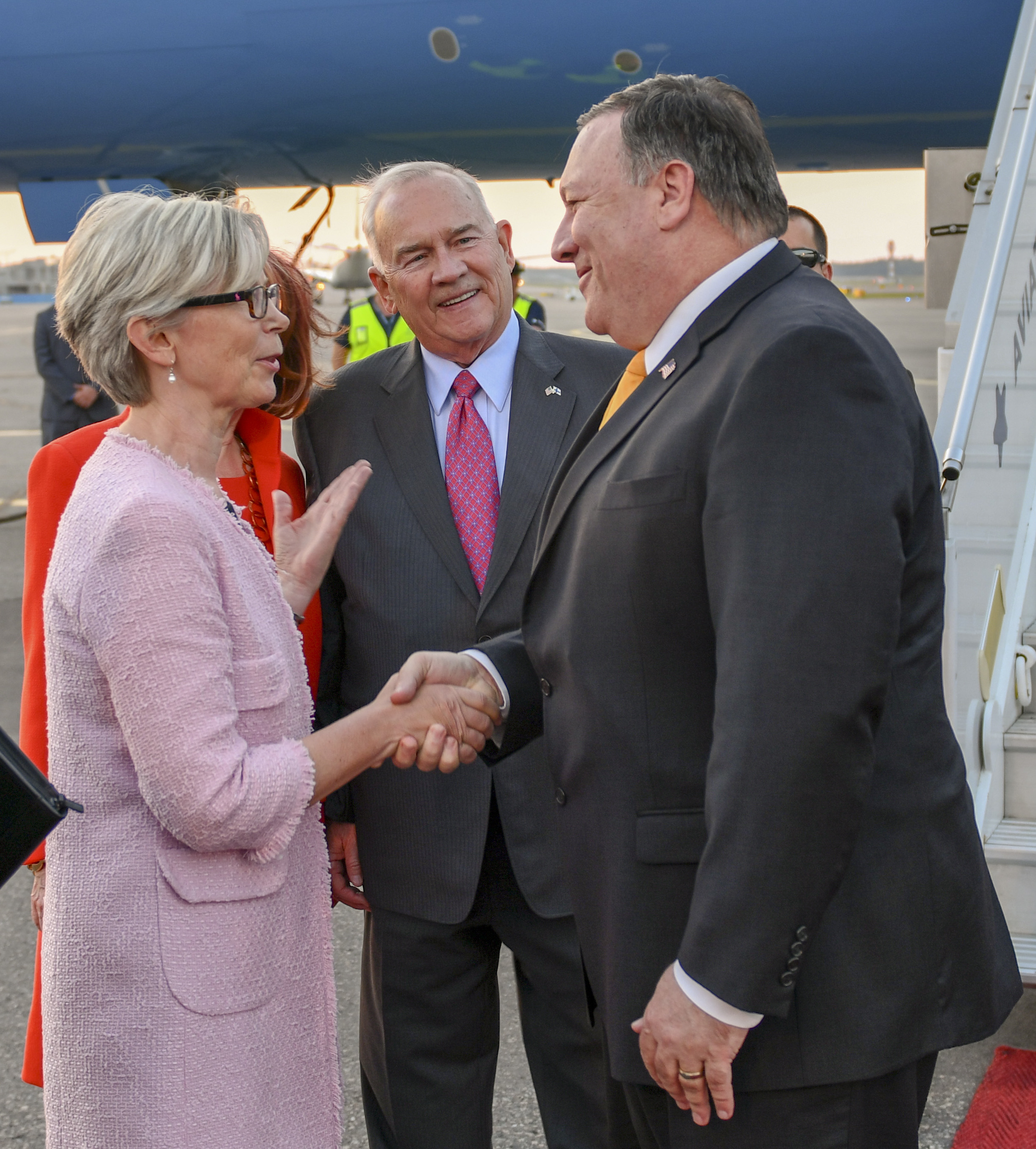
- Kauppi greets Mike Pompeo in Helsinki in 2018

Finnish Ambassador to the United States
- In office January 2015 – 2020
- Preceded by: Ritva Koukku-Ronde
- Succeeded by: Mikko Hautala

Personal details
- Born: 1957 (age 68–69) Oulu, Finland
- Education: Master of Science, Economics
- Alma mater: Helsinki School of Economics

Kirsti Helena Kauppi (born 1957) was the Finnish ambassador to the United States from January 2015 to September 2020. Prior to that she was in the post of Head of the Political Department of the Ministry for Foreign Affairs from 1 April 2012 until the end of 2014. Since 2009, she has served as Head of Division for the Department of Foreign Affairs of Africa and the Middle East. Previously, she has worked at the Ministry's Political Department, for example as Head of the European correspondent network and also in the Development Cooperation Department.

== Early life and education ==
Kauppi born in Oulu in 1957 and holds a Master of Science degree in economics. She graduated from the Helsinki School of Economics in 1981.

== Career ==
Kauppi started working for Finland's Ministry for Foreign Affairs in 1983.

Kauppi served in Vienna from 2005 to 2009 as the ambassador of Finland and Permanent Representative to the IAEA and the UN organizations in Vienna.

In addition to Vienna, Kauppi has served in the Finnish embassy in Berlin from 2003 to 2005 as Deputy Chief of Mission (Minister), as well in Washington, D.C. from 1997 to 2000, and Bangkok (1989–92). Ambassador Kauppi's solid knowledge on European Union affairs builds on her four-year tenure from 1993 to 1997, in the Finnish Permanent Mission to the EU in Brussels. Later on from 2001 to 2003 she was head of EU's Common Foreign and Security Policy coordination in the Ministry for Foreign Affairs in Helsinki. This was after serving in 2000 and 2001 as adviser to the State Secretary.

On 13 May 2016, Kauppi was among the guests invited to the state dinner hosted by U.S. President Barack Obama in honor of Finland’s president Sauli Niinistö and other Nordic leaders Lars Løkke Rasmussen, Sigurður Ingi Jóhannsson and Stefan Löfven at the White House.

== Publications ==
- Why the U.S. and Europe need each other, now more than ever, with Domingos Fezas Vital, The Dallas Morning News, 2019
