= Lintu =

Lintu is a Finnish surname derived from the Finnish word for bird. Notable people with the name include:

- Hannu Lintu (born 1967), Finnish conductor
- Pekka Lintu (born 1947), Finnish diplomat
