= Embassy of the United States, Helsinki =

US Diplomat Building

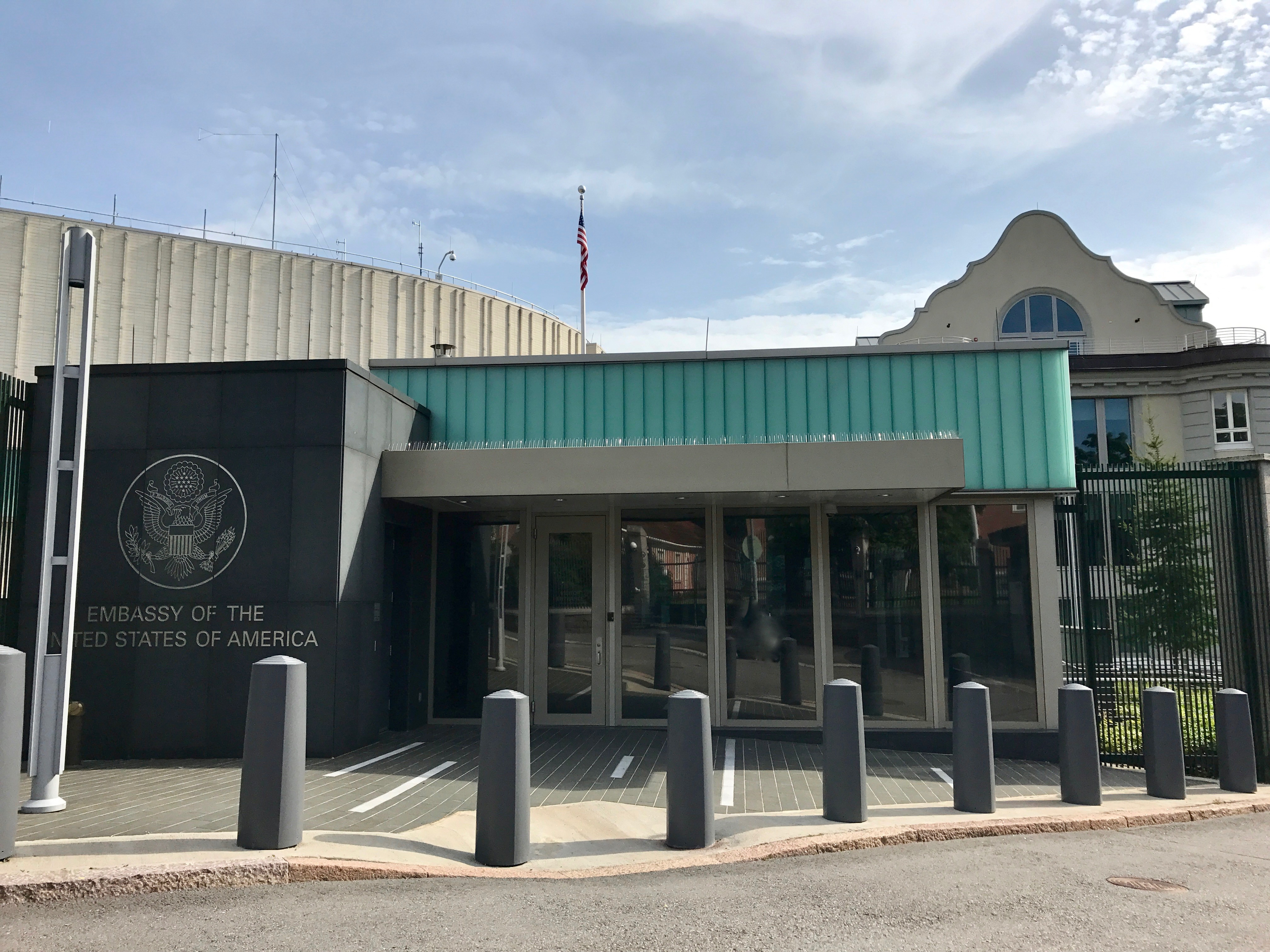
- Location: Helsinki, Finland
- Address: Itäinen Puistotie 14 B, 00140 Helsinki, Finland
- Coordinates: 60°9′25″N 24°57′40″E
- Ambassador: Howard W. Brodie
- Chargé d'affaires: J. Chris Karber
- Website: https://fi.usembassy.gov

The Embassy of the United States in Helsinki (Finnish: Yhdysvaltain suurlähetystö Helsingissä) is the diplomatic mission of the United States to Finland, located at the Kaivopuisto area in Helsinki, Finland.

== History ==
Diplomatic relations between the United States and Finland were established shortly after Finland declared its independence from the Russian Empire on December 6, 1917. The United States officially recognized Finland on May 7, 1919, as communicated in a letter from Secretary of State Robert Lansing to Finnish Foreign Minister Rudolf Holsti, and diplomatic relations were established on May 27, 1919. The first U.S. Legation in Helsinki was established on March 19, 1920, when Chargé d'Affaires pro tem Alexander R. Magruder presented his credentials.

Relations were disrupted during World War II following Finland's alliance with Nazi Germany against the Soviet Union, which led to the closing of the U.S. Legation in Helsinki on June 30, 1944. Informal relations were resumed later in the year after Finland signed an armistice with the Allies and expelled German nationals from its territory.

Formal diplomatic relations were reinstated on September 1, 1945, and the American Legation in Helsinki was reestablished, with Benjamin M. Hulley serving as Chargé d'Affaires ad interim. The legation was later elevated to embassy status with Jack K. McFall assuming the role of Ambassador Extraordinary and Plenipotentiary on November 15, 1952.

The embassy has been on the same site in the Kaivopuisto District since the 1930s, but was renovated and extended in the 2010s. An Innovation Centre was completed in 2013 and a new Chancery, in white brick, was built.

In 2018 WikiLeaks revealed the embassy were using a large warehouse near the now-closed Helsinki-Malmi Airport to receive large amounts of goods flown in from Baghdad.

== See also ==
- Embassy of Finland, Washington, D.C.
- Finland–United States relations
- List of ambassadors of the United States to Finland
