= Olavi Munkki =

Finnish diplomat

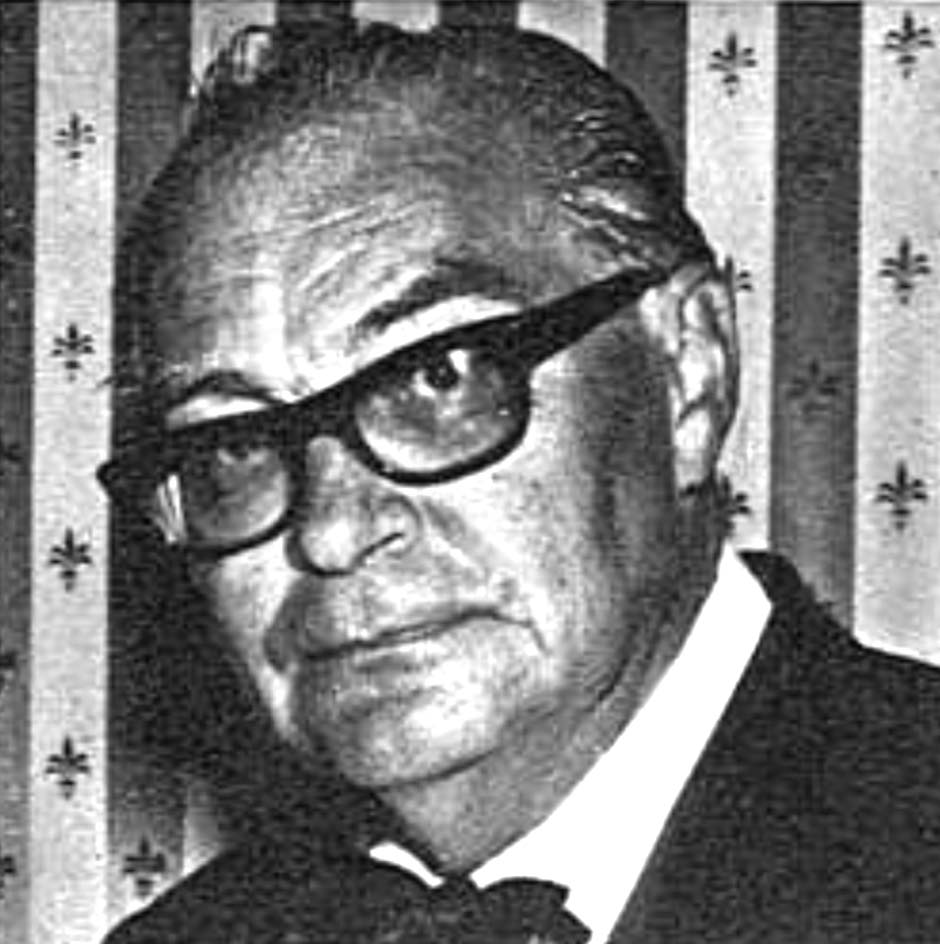
Olavi Munkki in 1970

Olavi Munkki (July 8, 1909 Viipuri – March 4, 1978 Helsinki) was a Finnish diplomat.

Munkki completed his undergraduate degree in 1929 and completed a degree in law in 1936.

Munkki moved to the Finnish Ministry for Foreign Affairs in 1937 and served as Assistant at the Finnish Embassy in London from 1937 to 1942, as Secretary of State for Foreign Affairs from 1942 to 1945, as Secretary of State at the Embassy of Finland in Washington in 1945–1950, as Foreign Minister in 1950–1952 and Consul in Cologne in 1952–1956. He served as the Head of the Department of Commerce of the Ministry of Foreign Affairs from 1956 to 1962 and then Ambassador and Envoy to several countries, in Switzerland 1962–1965, in the United States1965–1972 and Oslo 1973–1976. He conducted negotiations on Finland's observe membership in the European Free Trade Association 1960–1961.

He was granted a diplomatic title of Envoy Extraordinary and Minister Plenipotentiary in 1959.
