= Jaakko Laajava =

Finnish diplomat

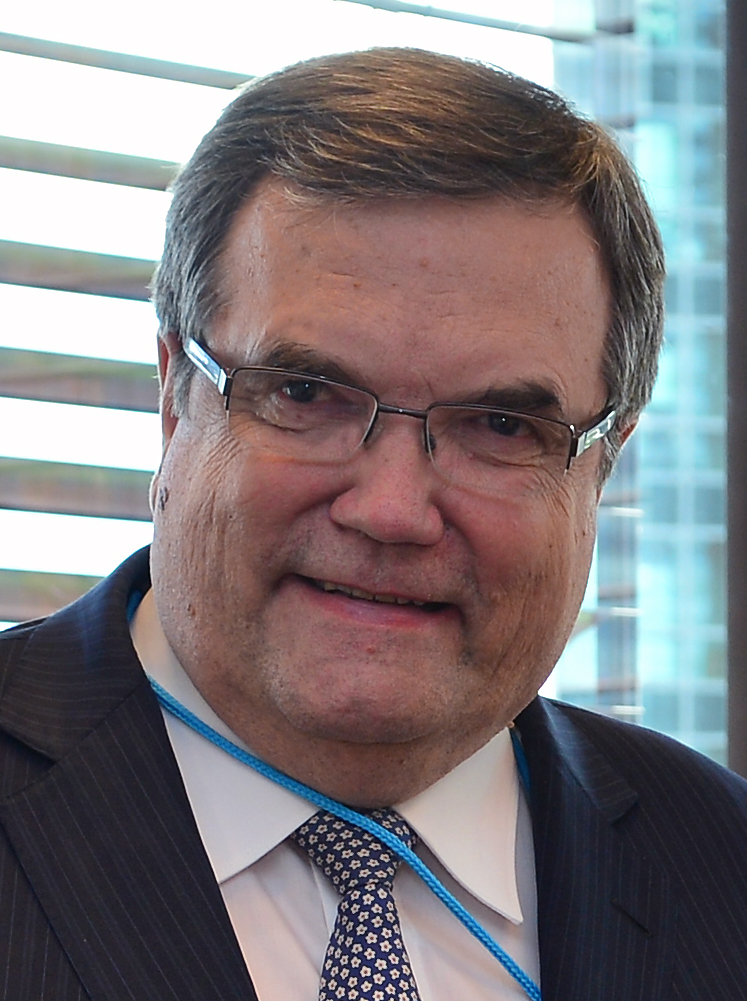
Jaakko Laajava

Jaakko Tapani Laajava (born 23 June 1947 in Joensuu) has served as Foreign Affairs and Security Policy Under-Secretary of State for Foreign Affairs for Finland from 1 April 2010. Prior to that, he served as Ambassador to the United Kingdom in 2005.

== Career ==
Between 2001 and 2004, Laajava worked as the political under-secretary of the Ministry of Foreign Affairs. Laajava has been an Ambassador in the United States in 1996–2001. He moved there as Deputy Director General of the Political Department of the Ministry of Foreign Affairs and as Head of the 1990–1996. He was Deputy Minister of Foreign Affairs and Ambassador to the Embassy of Finland in 1986–1990.

For the first time in 1971, he was employed by the Foreign Service. In the 1970s, he worked as a broadcaster, assistant secretary and secretary of state in Switzerland, Poland, Yugoslavia and Spain.

In 2011, Laajava was chosen as the facilitator of the Conference on the Middle East Nuclear Non-Proliferation Conference.

== Other activities ==
In the early 1970s Laajava was represented by the Finnish Student Union in the DDR Recognition Committee. In that case, he was a member of the Liberal People's Party.

The bachelor's degree is bachelor's degree (B.A.) from the Stockholm University in 1972 and a master's degree (M.A.) from the University of Helsinki for the same year.
