= Mikko Hautala =

Finnish diplomat

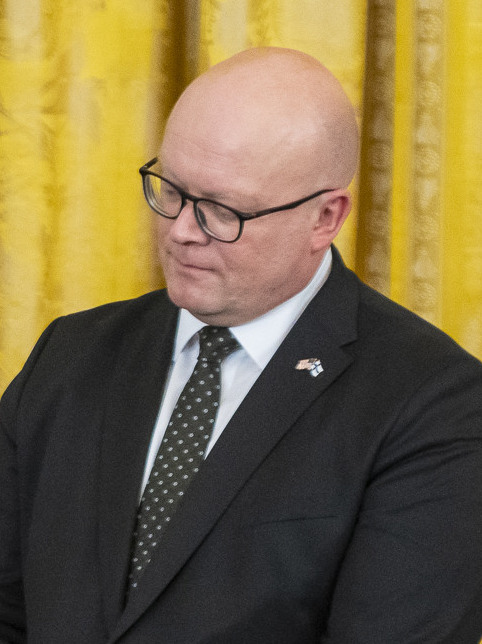
Hautala on August 9, 2022

Mikko Tapani Hautala (born 10 May 1972 Seinäjoki, Finland) is a Finnish diplomat. Since September 2020 he has worked as the Finnish ambassador to the United States.

== Education ==
Hautala has two master's degrees from the University of Helsinki, one in political science and one in Slavic philology.

He wrote his master's thesis in political science in 2000, with the title Promoting exports or foreign policy? Finnish relations to Ukraine as a political and economic question during 1917–1919 (164 pages). His thesis in Slavic philology was completed in 2006, with the title The Polish period of changes in 1980–1981 as described by the journal Kultura (114 pages). Both theses were written in Finnish.

Hautala speaks fluent Finnish, English, Swedish, Russian, Ukrainian and Polish.

== Diplomatic career ==
Hautala began his diplomatic career as an attaché in the Finnish embassy in Kyiv during 1998–2001. During the latter mentioned year he began his service properly with the Finnish Foreign Ministry, where during 2001–02 he worked as an attaché. During 2002–07 he worked at the Finnish representation in the EU in Brussels, and during 2007–2011 he worked as a diplomatic advisor in the Foreign Ministry in Helsinki.

During 2012–16 Hautala worked as a foreign policy advisor for the President of Finland, Sauli Niinistö. In this capacity, he was among the guests invited to the state dinner hosted by U.S. President Barack Obama in honor of Niinistö as well as other Nordic leaders Lars Løkke Rasmussen, Sigurður Ingi Jóhannsson, Erna Solberg and Stefan Löfven at the White House on 13 May 2016.

From 2011 Hautala worked as the deputy head of the Finnish embassy in Moscow. During 2016–2020 he worked in Moscow as the Finnish ambassador to Russia.

== Other activities ==
Hautala writes columns for the Finnish newsmagazine Suomen Kuvalehti with the title of Näkökulma (transl. Point of View).

== Views on the war between Russia and Ukraine ==
According to Hautala, an independent Ukraine is an impossible idea to the Russian leadership. Unfortunate for Ukraine, Russia has usurped her early history and made it part of the Russian mythical beginning. He believes that, for Russia, no separate Ukraine can exist. During the Tsarist Russia, the state repressed heavily the Ukrainian national culture, the Ukrainians were not granted any national institutions or their own educational system. Neither did the Russian regime take the Ukrainian national ideas seriously later. “Ukraine in a sense cannot exist, because it is in contradiction with the Russian idea of history, it is an insult to it. An independent Ukraine is also in contradiction with the Russian idea of Russia as a superpower. It is felt that Russia without Ukraine is too small a player on the international scene.”
