= Leonard Åström =

Finnish diplomat

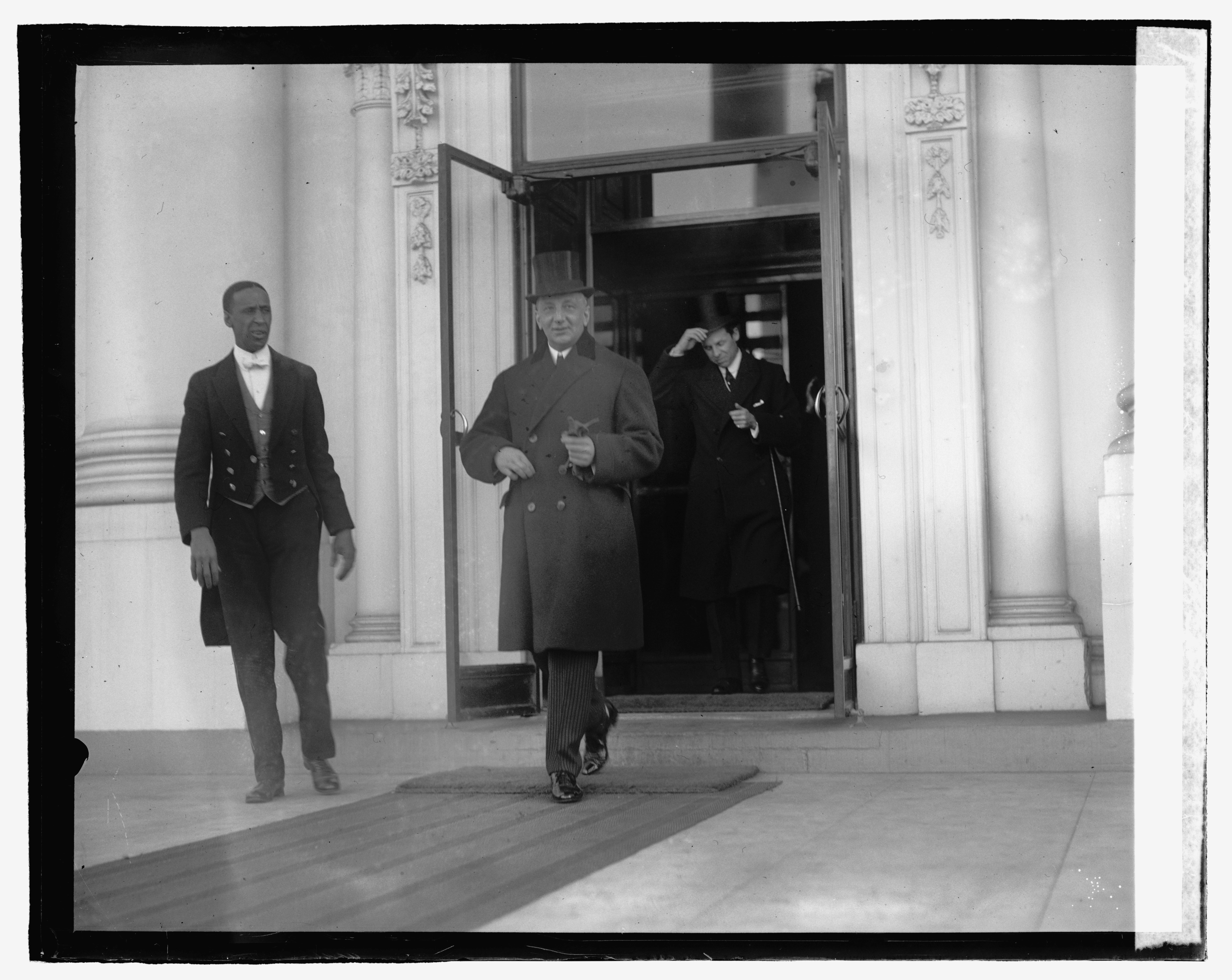
Astrom at the White House.

Aksel Leonard "Lenna" Åström (7 March 1883 – 16 May 1939) was a Finnish diplomat.

== Early life ==
Åström was born in Oulu. His parents were my sea captain Axel Mikael Åström and Maria Åström. He graduated from the Oulu Swedish Lyceum in 1902 and studied at the University of Helsinki completing Bachelor of Philosophy in 1909 and Mastering in 1910.

== Career ==
Åström was a journalist and shareholder of the Oulu newspaper Kaleva in 1904–1906, as a teacher at the Business College in Kotka in 1910–1916 and in Tampere in 1916–1917, and as a representative of the Tampere Chamber of commerce in 1918.

He served as the Senior Inspector of Trade and Industrial Governance in 1919 and the Trade Policy Department of the Foreign Ministry 1919–1921. This was followed by Åström as Envoy in Washington, D.C. from 1921 to 1934, and also as Envoy to Havana from 1929 to 1934. While in Washington, D.C., he negotiated Finnish debt with Secretary Andrew Mellon.

Åström was an Envoy in The Hague and Brussels from 1938 to 1939. He shot himself in Brussels in May 1939.
