= Armas Saastamoinen =

Finnish businessman, MP and envoy (1886–1932)

Armas Herman Saastamoinen
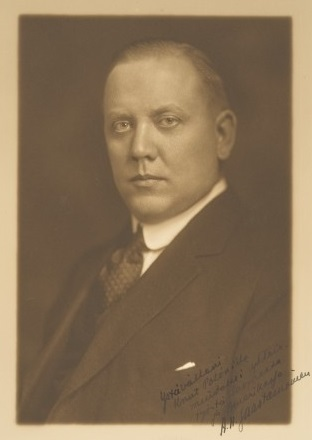
- Armas Saastamoinen as Finnish Minister in Washington, D.C.
- Born: Armas Herman Saastamoinen; 14 April 1886; Kuopio, Grand Duchy of Finland
- Died: 20 October 1932 (aged 46); London, United Kingdom
- Occupations: Businessman, diplomat, politician
- Known for: Finnish envoy to Copenhagen, Washington and London
- Spouse: Edla Emilia (Emily) Carssen (m. 1909)
- Parent(s): Herman Saastamoinen; Alexandra Sofia Tengman

Armas Herman Saastamoinen (14 April 1886 – 20 October 1932) was a Finnish businessman, diplomat and politician. The eldest son of industrialist Herman Saastamoinen, he was one of the organisers of the Jäger movement during the First World War and participated in the Finnish Civil War on the White side. After Finnish independence he represented Finland as envoy in Copenhagen, Washington and London, and served as a Member of Parliament for the National Coalition Party from 1924 to 1926.

== Biography ==
=== Early life and Jäger movement ===
A. H. Saastamoinen was the eldest son of commercial Counselor Herman Saastamoinen and Alexandra Sofia Tengman. His spouse since 1909 was Edla Emilia (Emily) Carssen. Saastamoinen participated in the activities of the Jäger movement in North Savo. He also visited the Lockstedt Jaeger camp in Hohenlockstedt.

Saastamoinen was the head of the Savo District Civil Guard in 1917 and chief of staff of the Northern Savo and Kainuu military district during the Finnish Civil War in 1918.

=== Diplomatic career ===
After the war, Saastamoinen became Finland's first envoy to Copenhagen from April 1918, receiving the rank of minister in October 1918. He was selected for the post on account of his business contacts in Scandinavia, his language skills, his political suitability and his personal wealth. His most important task was to help alleviate Finland's food supply situation in the difficult post-war period.

He was then appointed envoy to Washington in May 1919. His appointment was due to his command of English, his earlier stay in North America and his knowledge of economic affairs. His principal task was to procure food and other goods and to raise loans to finance the purchases. He returned to Finland in 1920 following the death of his father; his departure was also influenced by the victory of President Ståhlberg's centrist policy, which Saastamoinen found difficult to accept.

Saastamoinen was appointed Finland's envoy to London and The Hague in January 1926, serving until his death.

=== Return to Finland and later life ===
He returned to Finland in 1920 to work in his family business H. Saastamoinen Ltd, H. Saastamoinen & Pojat Oy and Saastamoinen Oy, continuing until 1926. He was a Member of Parliament from 1924 to 1926 for the National Coalition Party.

Saastamoinen suffered his first heart attack in 1930 and a second in 1932, from which he did not recover. He died in London in October 1932.
