= Johan Nykopp =

Finnish diplomat

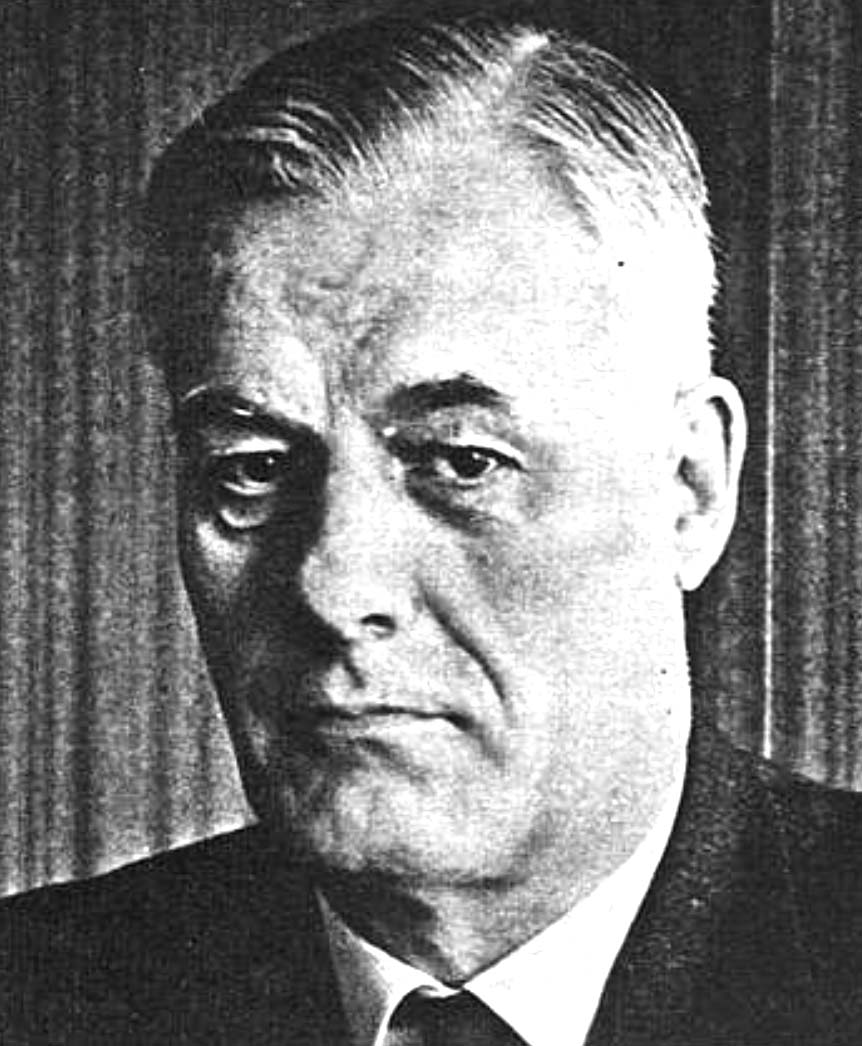
Johan Nykopp in 1964

Johan Albert Nykopp (27 May 1906, Le Vésinet, France – 28 April 1993) was a long-time Finnish diplomat and vuorineuvos. Towards the end of the 1950s he entered the world of business first as the CEO of the Finnish Employers' Union and then as managing director of Oy Tampella Ab from 1962 to 1972.

== Career ==
Nykopp served for a long time diplomat in the 1930s in the Soviet Union, first as a delegation assistant in Moscow from 1931 to 1935, and later as a Finnish Consul to Leningrad from 1935 to 1937.

In February–March 1939, Nykopp was a member of the Finnish trade delegation. In the autumn of 1939, he participated in the Moscow negotiations before the Winter War with J. K. Paasikivi as secretary to the Finnish delegation. After the war years, Nykopp served as deputy head of the Department for Trade Policy at the Ministry of Foreign Affairs from 1945 to 1947, and as head of division until 1951. Nykopp returned from the Moscow trade negotiations on February 24, 1950. He was replaced by Uuno Takki.

In the 1950s he served as Finnish Envoy to the United States from 1951 to 1954, and was ambassador from 1954 to 1958. He was ambassador to Cuba from 1951 to 1958, to Colombia from 1954 to 1958, to Venezuela from 1954 to 1958, and to Mexico from 1951 to 1958. He died in Helsinki, aged 86.
