= Leena-Kaisa Mikkola =

Finnish diplomat

Leena-Kaisa Mikkola is a Finnish diplomat. She was Finnish Ambassador to Tel Aviv from 1 September 2011 to 30 August 2016. She joined the Ministry for Foreign Affairs in 1992. Before that, Mikkola worked at the Finnish Red Cross.

Prior to her work as an ambassador Mikkola was the Head of Unit at the Political Department of the Foreign Ministry at the EU Common Foreign and Security Policy Unit, where she was from 2007 to 2011. Currently, Mikkola is the Director General of the Africa Middle East Department at the Ministry for Foreign Affairs.

In January 2021 Mikkola was named as the next Finnish Ambassador to China and she will be assigned to Beijing on Autumn 2021.

Since September 2024, Mikkola has been the Finnish ambassador to the United States of America.
