= Ritva Koukku-Ronde =

Finnish diplomat

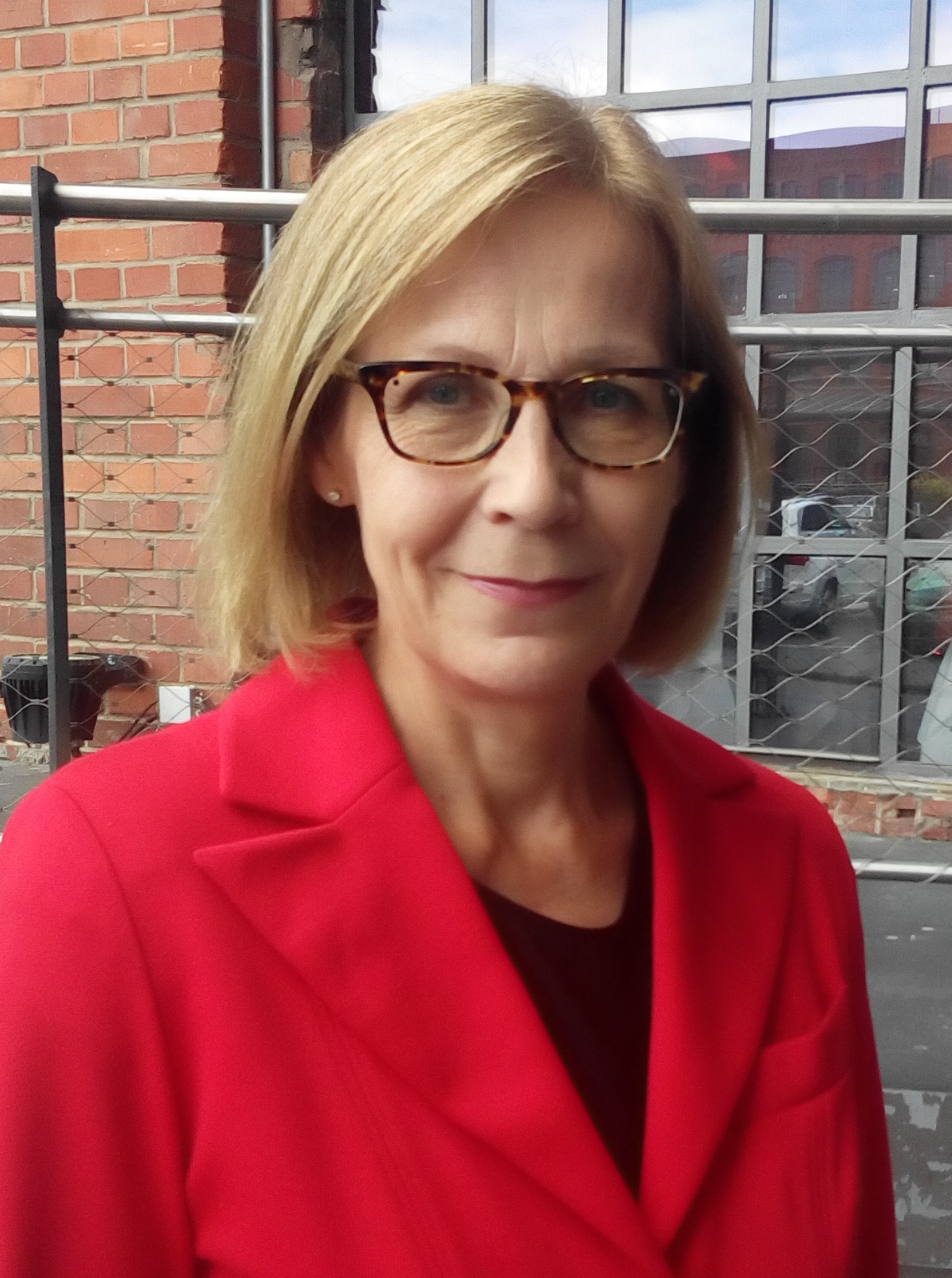
Ritva Koukku-Ronde (2016)

Ritva Inkeri Koukku-Ronde (née Koukku, s. 15 April 1956 Lahti) is a Finnish diplomat. She started as Ambassador to Berlin on September 1, 2015. Prior to being as Ambassador to Washington since 2011.

== Early life and education ==
Koukku-Ronde completed her undergraduate degree in 1976. She graduated from the University of Tampere in 1982 where she studied history and information. In her thesis, Koukku-Ronde addressed the women's voting right in Britain 1906–1918.

== Career ==
Between 1982 and 1985 Koukku-Ronde worked as a freelance journalist.

Between 1983 and 1984 Hook-Ronde worked as secretary of the Embassy of the Hague of Finland. She joined the Ministry for Foreign Affairs in 1985. She has worked in several positions at the Ministry and the Hague, Bonn, Nairobi and Berlin Representatives.

Between 2003 and 2005, Koukku-Ronde served as Deputy Director General of the European Department of the Ministry for Foreign Affairs, 2005–2009 Head of the Development Policy Department and 2009–2011 as Under-Secretary of State for Development and Development Co-operation.

Since 2019, Ronde has served as the Ambassador of Finland to India, and has sparked active work in the fields of 5G, 6G, AI, Quantum Computing and much more. She is currently also the European Union Gender Champion in 2021.

== Other activities ==
- African Development Bank (AfDB), Ex-Officio Member of the Board of Governors (2009-2011)

== Personal life ==
Koukku-Ronde's spouse is a Doctor of Technology Dutch -born Hidde Ronde. They have two children.
