= Pekka Lintu =

Finnish diplomat

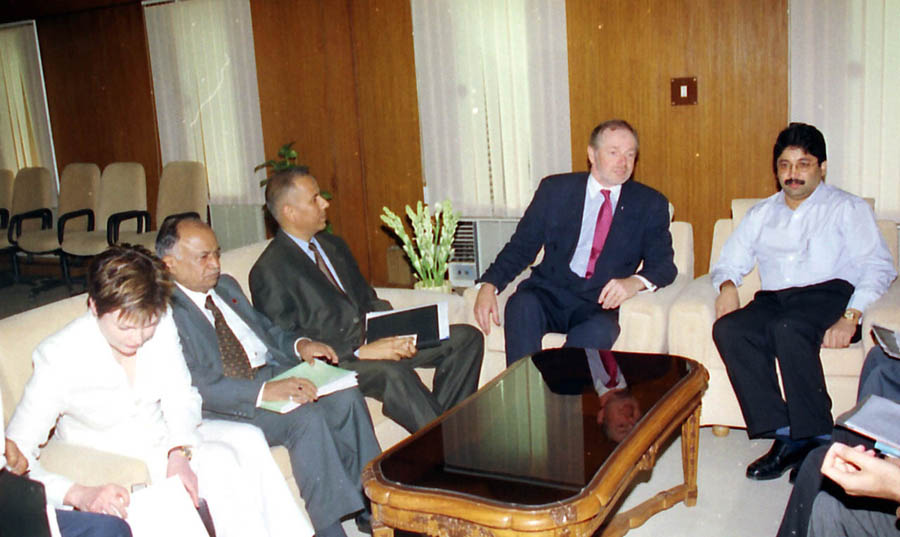
Pekka Lintu with Dayanidhi Maran

Pekka Lintu (born 1947) is a Finnish diplomat. He has served as Finland's ambassador to Greece since 2011.

He is also accredited from Athens to Albania. Between 2006 and 2011, Lintu served as Ambassador in Washington, D.C., US. Between 1994 and 2001 he was an ambassador in Tokyo, Japan.

Lintu joined the Ministry for Foreign Affairs in 1972. He worked in 1975–1979 at the Finnish Permanent Representation in Geneva. Between 1984 and 1987, he was Counselor at the OECD delegation in Paris. In addition, he has worked at the Ministry of Foreign Affairs in several trade policy positions and in the Development Policy Department.

Lintu is a Licentiate of Law
