= List of diplomatic missions of Finland =

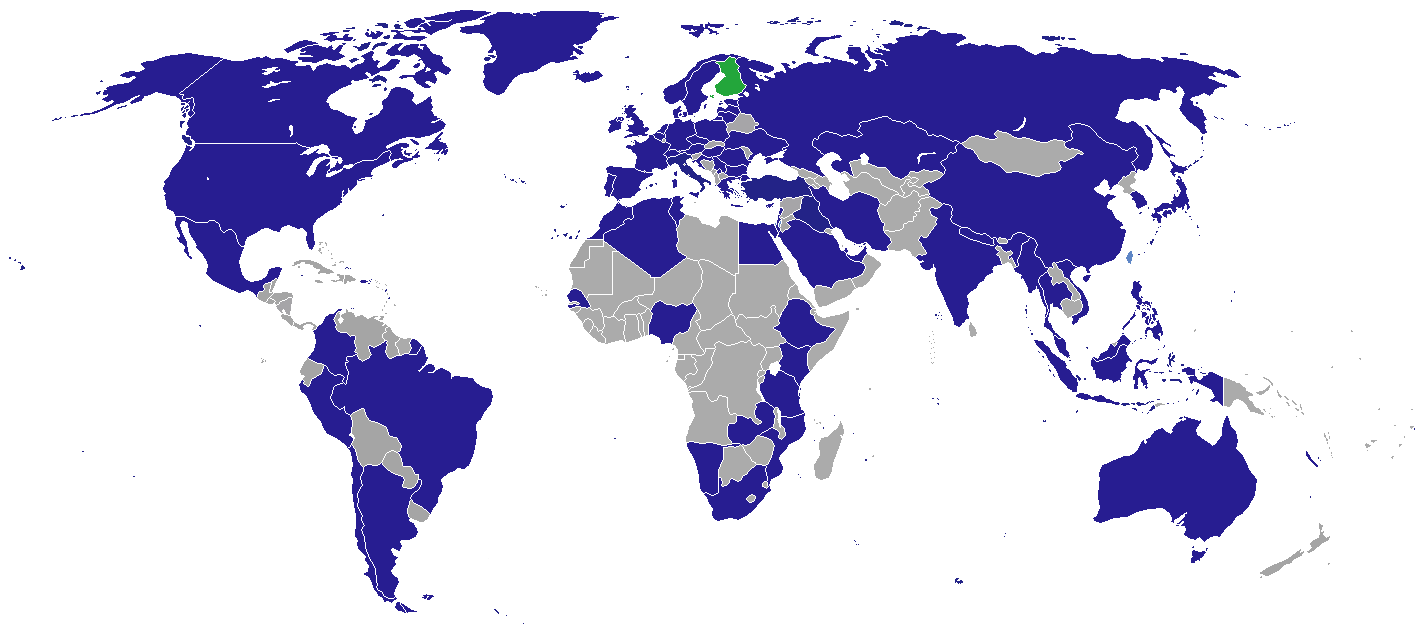
Finnish diplomatic missions

Finland's foreign affairs ministry was established shortly after its independence in 1917. To encourage its international recognition and promote its frontier, trade and maritime interests, Finland had commissioned twelve diplomatic missions abroad by the end of 1918. By the time the Second World War broke out there were 20 Finnish embassies (of which four were outside Europe) and six consulates.

As of 2026, the modern-day Republic of Finland has a streamlined diplomatic network that consists of 72 embassies, 6 consulates-general, 1 consulate, 7 permanent missions or representations to multilateral organizations, and two separate offices: a liaison office in Belarus and a representative office in Palestine.

In countries without Finnish representation, Finnish citizens can seek assistance from public officials in the foreign services of any of the other Nordic countries, in accordance with the Helsinki Treaty.

== Current missions ==
=== Africa ===
Host country	Host city	Mission	Concurrent accreditation	Ref.
Algeria	Algiers	Embassy		
Egypt	Cairo	Embassy	Countries: Sudan	
Ethiopia	Addis Ababa	Embassy	Countries: Djibouti; South Sudan; Multilateral Organizations: African Union (Note: Accredited as an observer mission.)	
Kenya	Nairobi	Embassy	Countries: Eritrea; Seychelles; Somalia; Uganda; Multilateral Organizations: United Nations; United Nations Environment Programme; United Nations Human Settlements Programme	
Morocco	Rabat	Embassy	Countries: Mauritania	
Mozambique	Maputo	Embassy	Countries: Angola; Eswatini; Madagascar	
Namibia	Windhoek	Embassy		
Nigeria	Abuja	Embassy	Countries: Benin; Ghana; Liberia; Multilateral Organizations: Economic Community of West African States	
Senegal	Dakar	Embassy	Countries: Ivory Coast; Gambia	
South Africa	Pretoria	Embassy	Countries: Botswana; Lesotho; Mauritius	
Tanzania	Dar es Salaam	Embassy	Countries: Burundi; Rwanda	
Tunisia	Tunis	Embassy	Countries: Libya	
Zambia	Lusaka	Embassy	Countries: Congo-Kinshasa; Malawi; Zimbabwe	

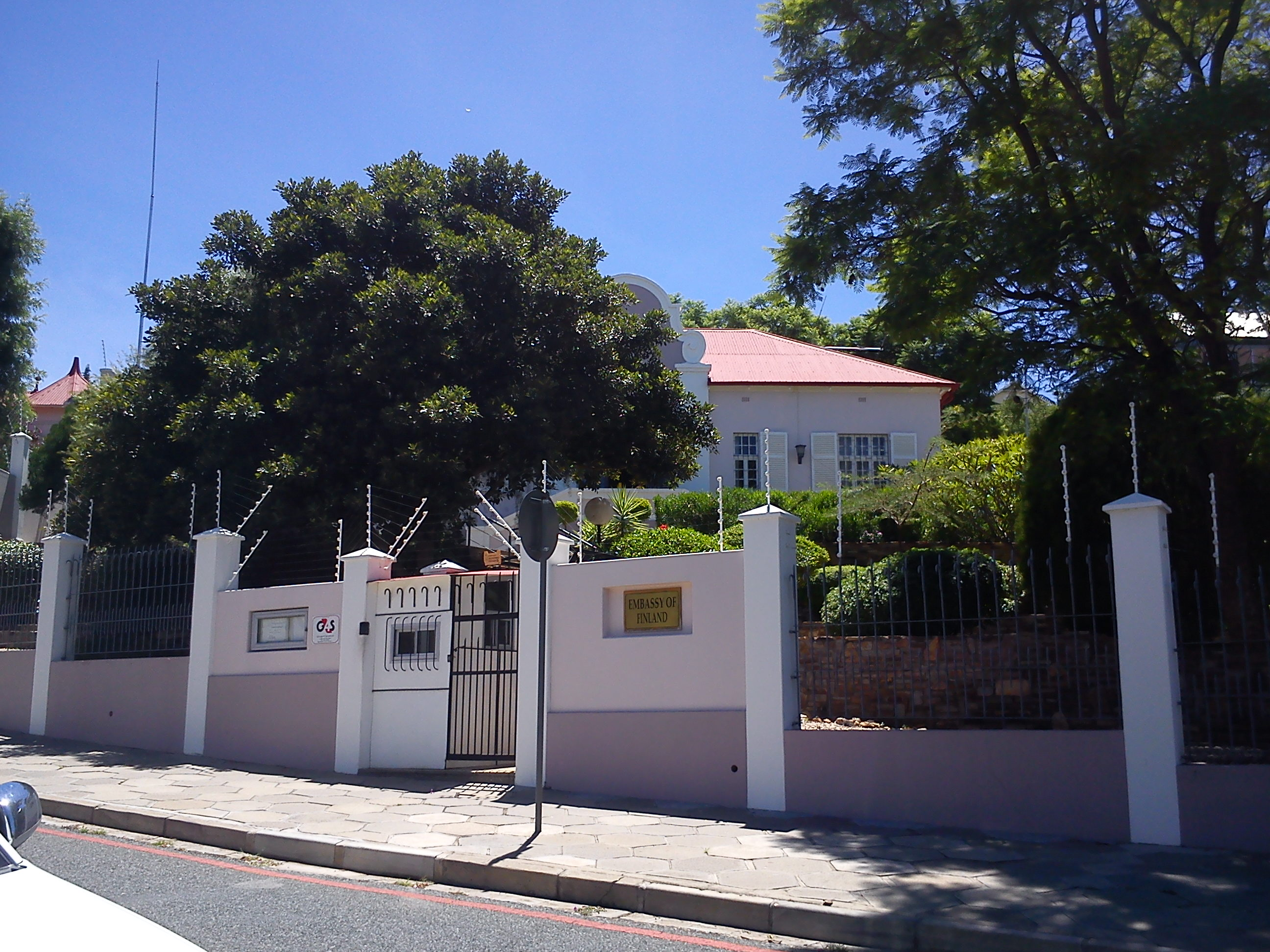
Embassy in Windhoek

=== Americas ===
Host country	Host city	Mission	Concurrent accreditation	Ref.
Argentina	Buenos Aires	Embassy	Countries: Paraguay; Uruguay	
Brazil	Brasília	Embassy		
Brazil	São Paulo	Consulate		
Canada	Ottawa	Embassy		
Chile	Santiago de Chile	Embassy		
Colombia	Bogotá	Embassy	Countries: Dominican Republic; Panama; Venezuela	
Mexico	Mexico City	Embassy	Countries: Costa Rica; Cuba; El Salvador; Guatemala; Honduras; Nicaragua	
Peru	Lima	Embassy	Countries: Bolivia; Ecuador	
United States	Washington, D.C.	Embassy	Multilateral Organizations: Organization of American States	
United States	Houston	Consulate-General	Multilateral Organizations: Organization of American States	
United States	Los Angeles	Consulate-General	Multilateral Organizations: Organization of American States	
United States	New York City	Consulate-General	Multilateral Organizations: Organization of American States	

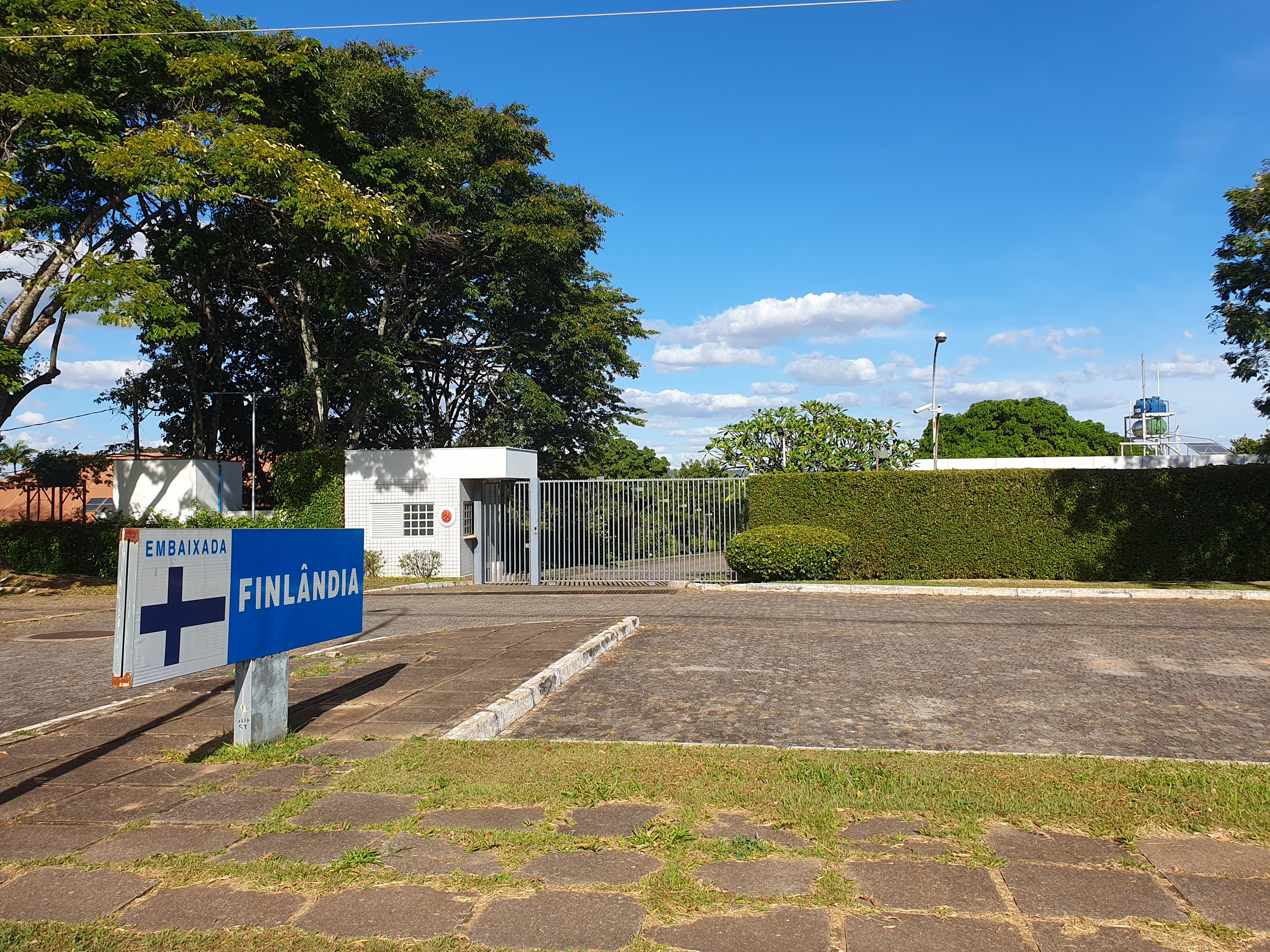
Embassy in Brasília

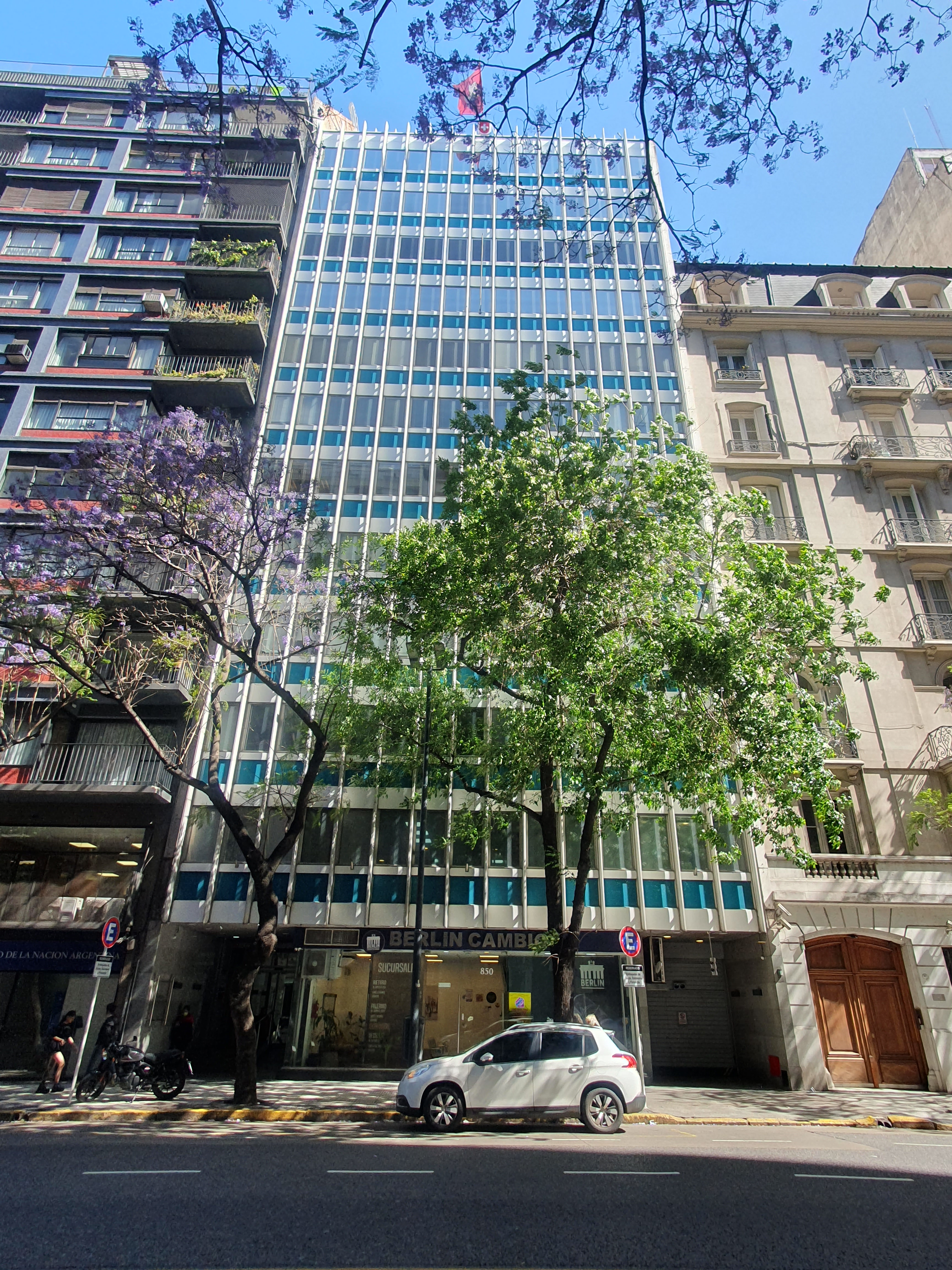
Building hosting the Embassy in Buenos Aires

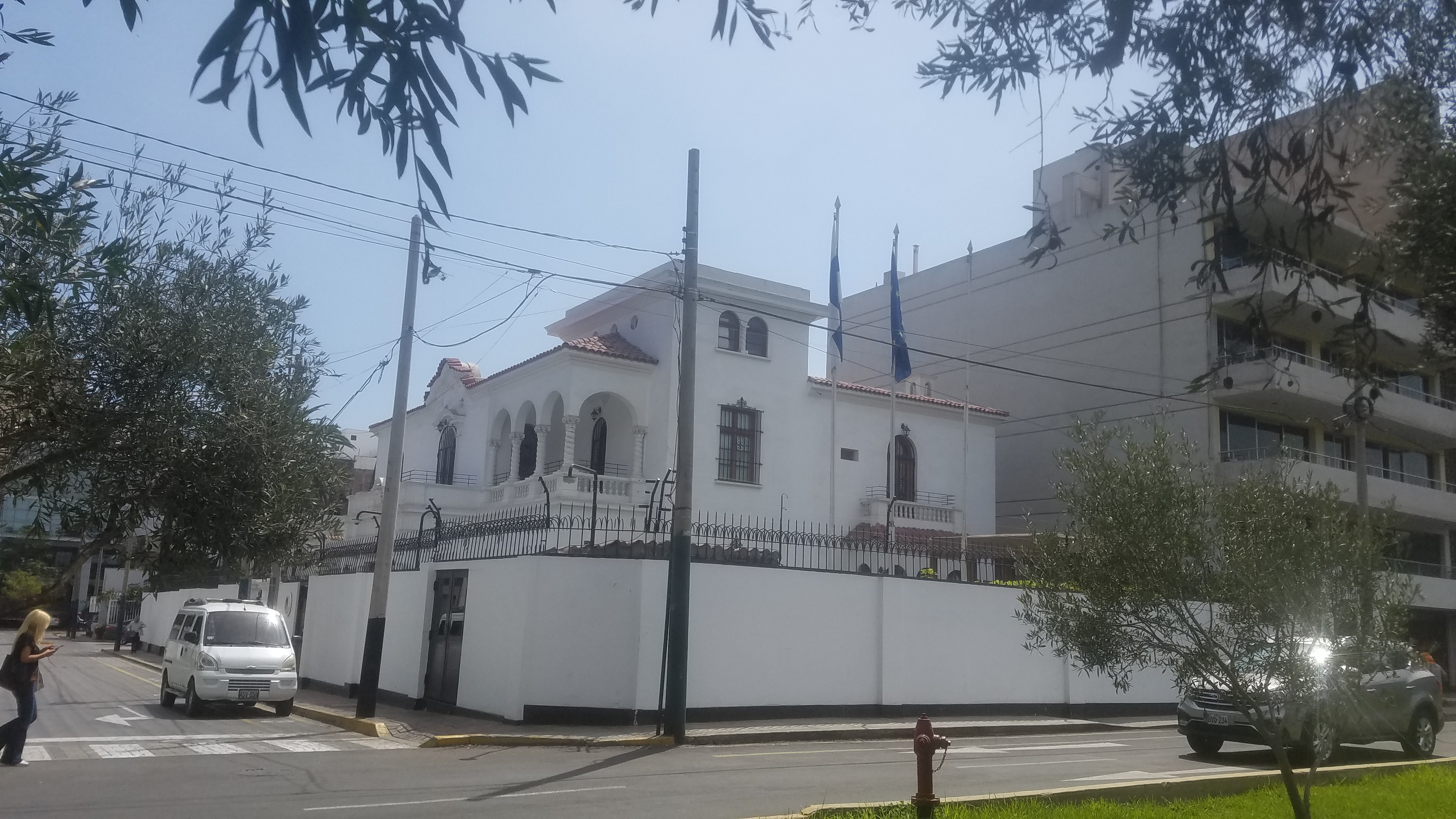
Embassy in Lima

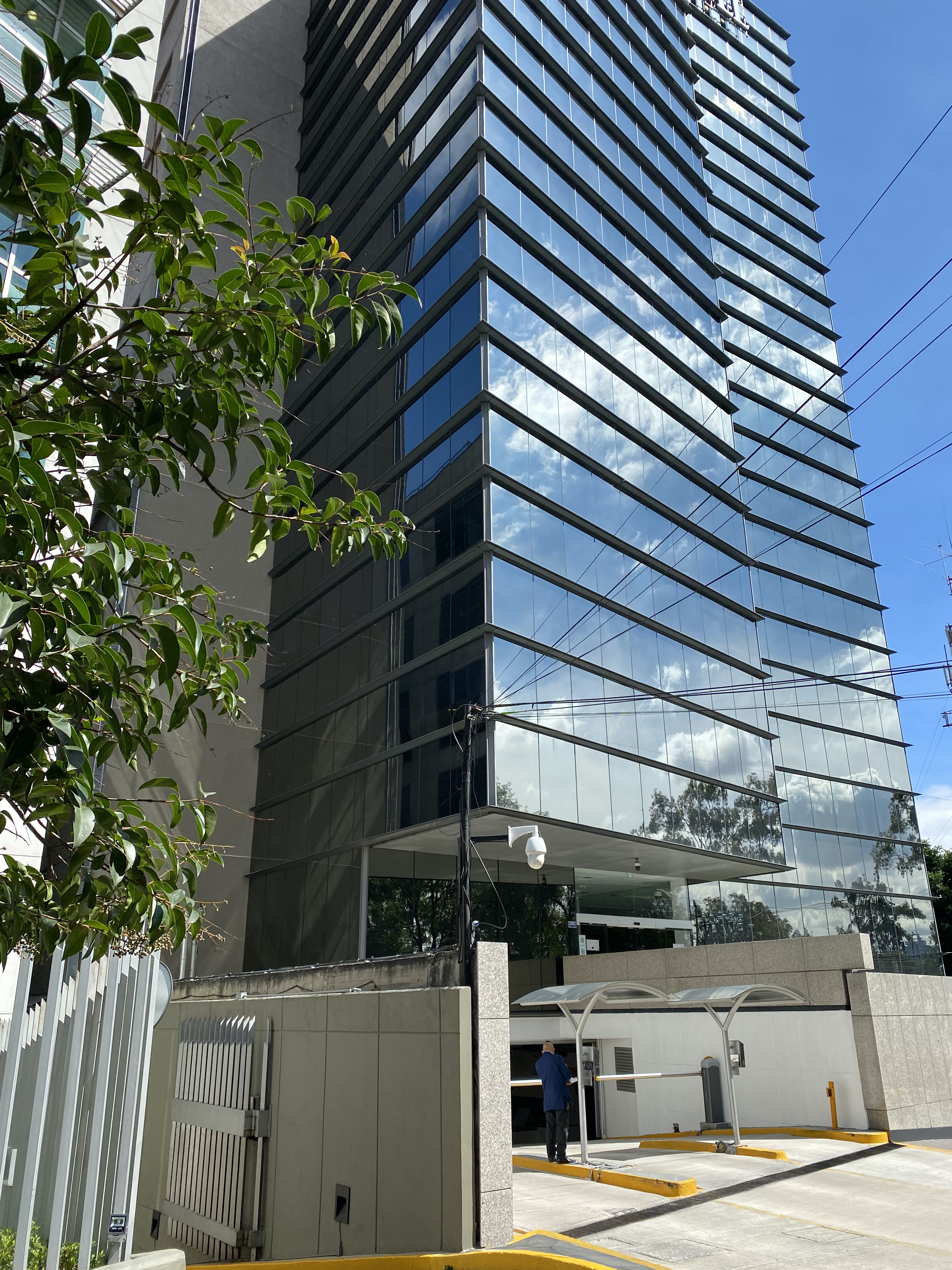
Building hosting the embassy in Mexico City

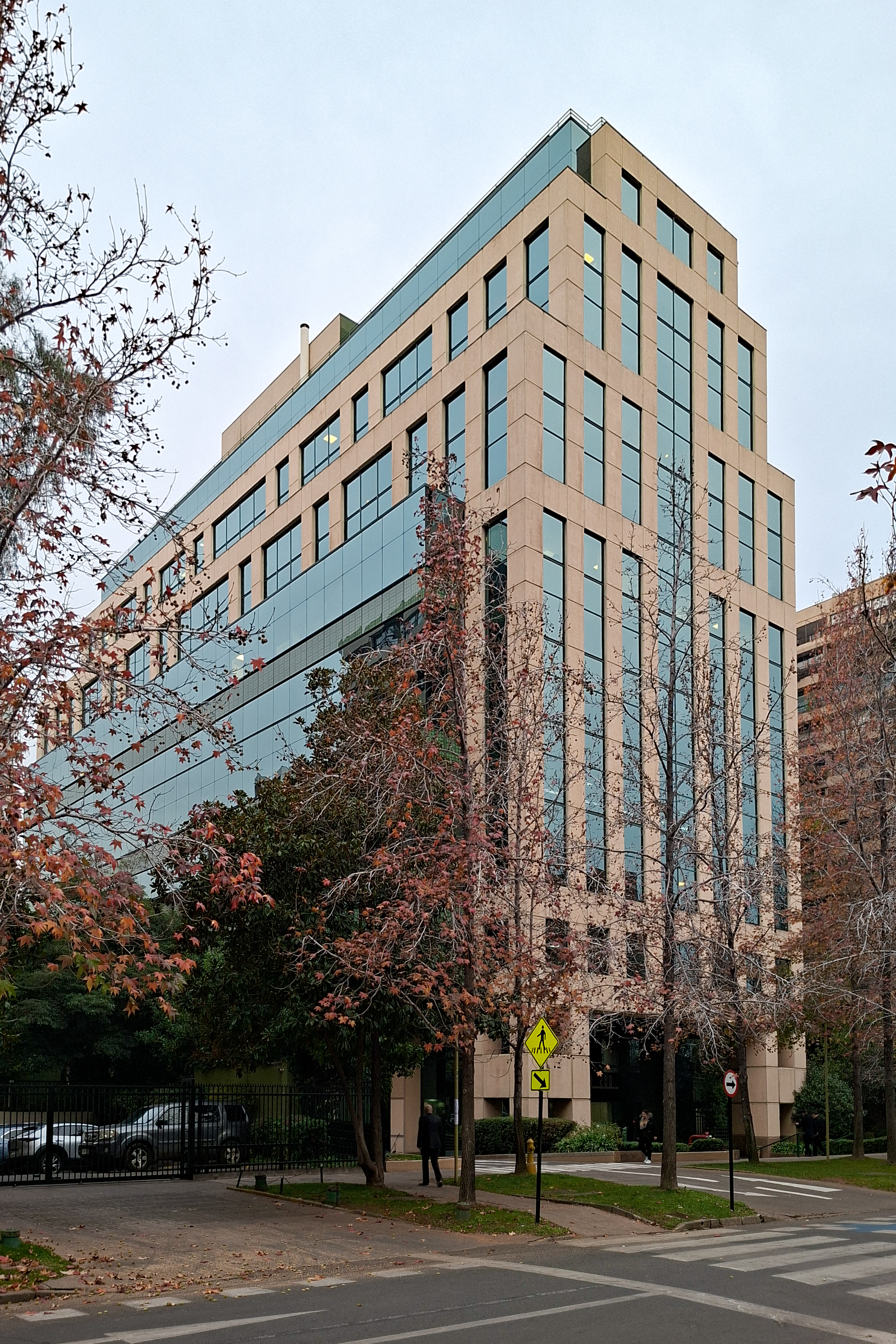
Building hosting the Embassy in Santiago

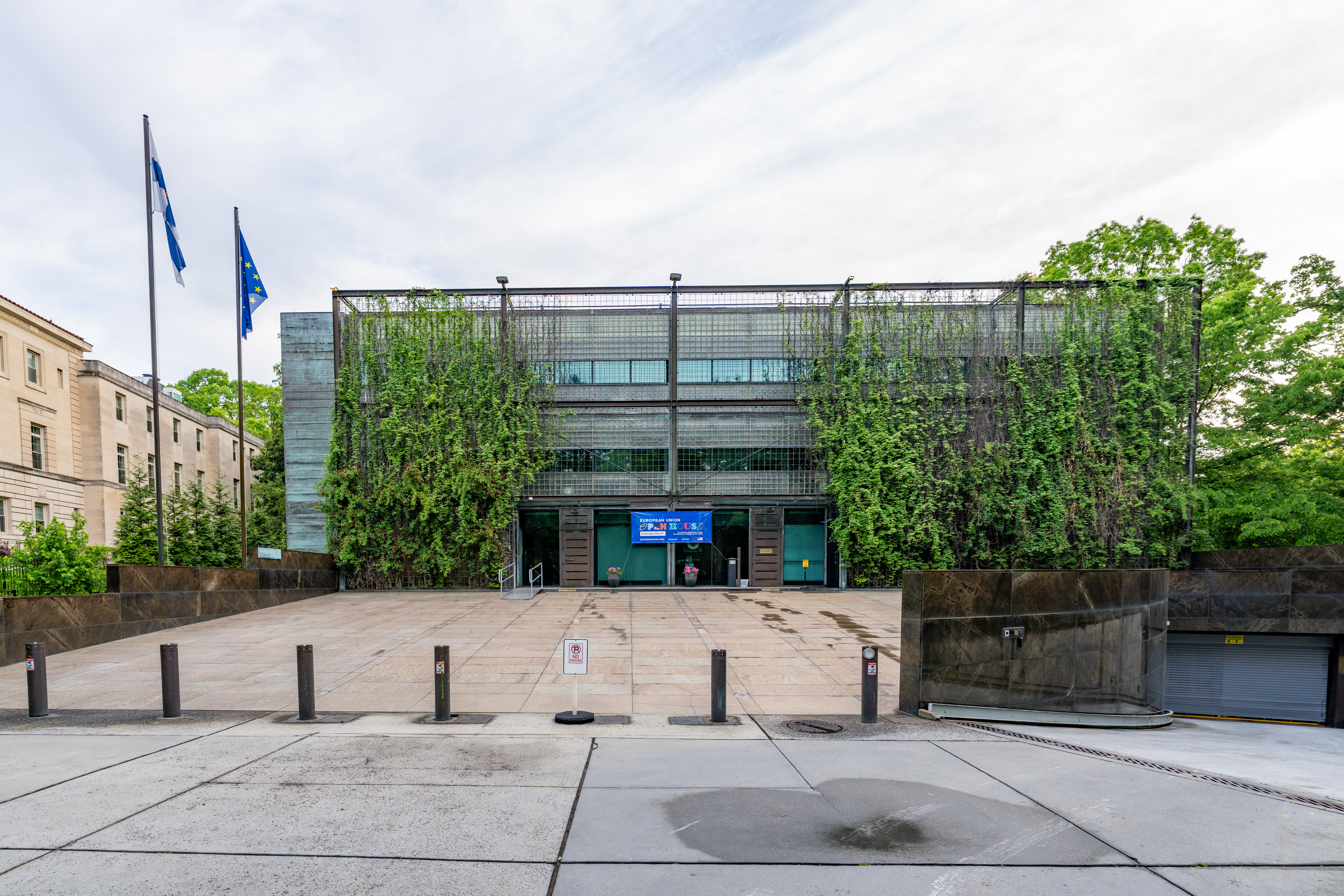
Embassy in Washington, D.C.

=== Asia ===
Host country	Host city	Mission	Concurrent accreditation	Ref.
China	Beijing	Embassy	Countries: Mongolia	
China	Hong Kong	Consulate-General	Countries: Mongolia	
China	Shanghai	Consulate-General	Countries: Mongolia	
India	New Delhi	Embassy	Countries: Bangladesh; Bhutan; Maldives; Sri Lanka	
India	Mumbai	Consulate-General	Countries: Bangladesh; Bhutan; Maldives; Sri Lanka	
Indonesia	Jakarta	Embassy	Countries: Timor-Leste; Multilateral Organizations: Association of Southeast Asian Nations	
Iran	Tehran	Embassy		
Iraq	Baghdad	Embassy		
Israel	Tel Aviv	Embassy		
Japan	Tokyo	Embassy	Countries: Marshall Islands; Micronesia; Palau	
Kazakhstan	Astana	Embassy	Countries: Kyrgyzstan	
Lebanon	Beirut	Embassy	Countries: Jordan; Syria	
Malaysia	Kuala Lumpur	Embassy	Countries: Brunei	
Nepal	Kathmandu	Embassy		
Palestine	Ramallah	Representative Office		
Philippines	Manila	Embassy		
Qatar	Doha	Embassy	Countries: Kuwait	
Saudi Arabia	Riyadh	Embassy	Countries: Oman; Yemen	
Singapore	Singapore	Embassy		
South Korea	Seoul	Embassy	Countries: North Korea	
Republic of China (Taiwan)	Taipei	Trade Center		
Thailand	Bangkok	Embassy	Countries: Cambodia; Myanmar; Multilateral Organizations: UN Economic and Social Commission for Asia and the Pacific	
Turkey	Ankara	Embassy		
United Arab Emirates	Abu Dhabi	Embassy	Countries: Bahrain; Multilateral Organizations: International Renewable Energy Agency	
Vietnam	Hanoi	Embassy	Countries: Laos	

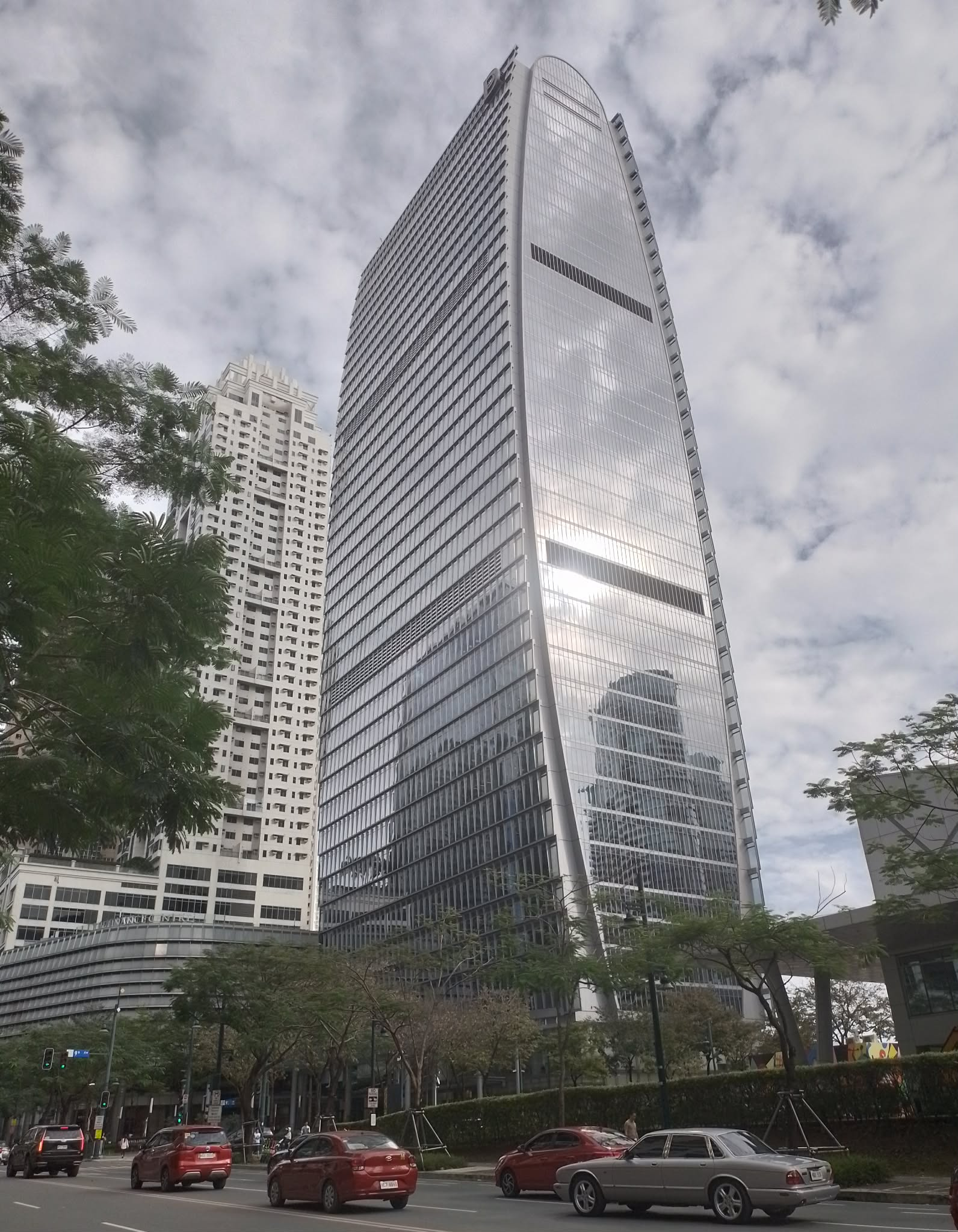
Building hosting the Embassy in Manila

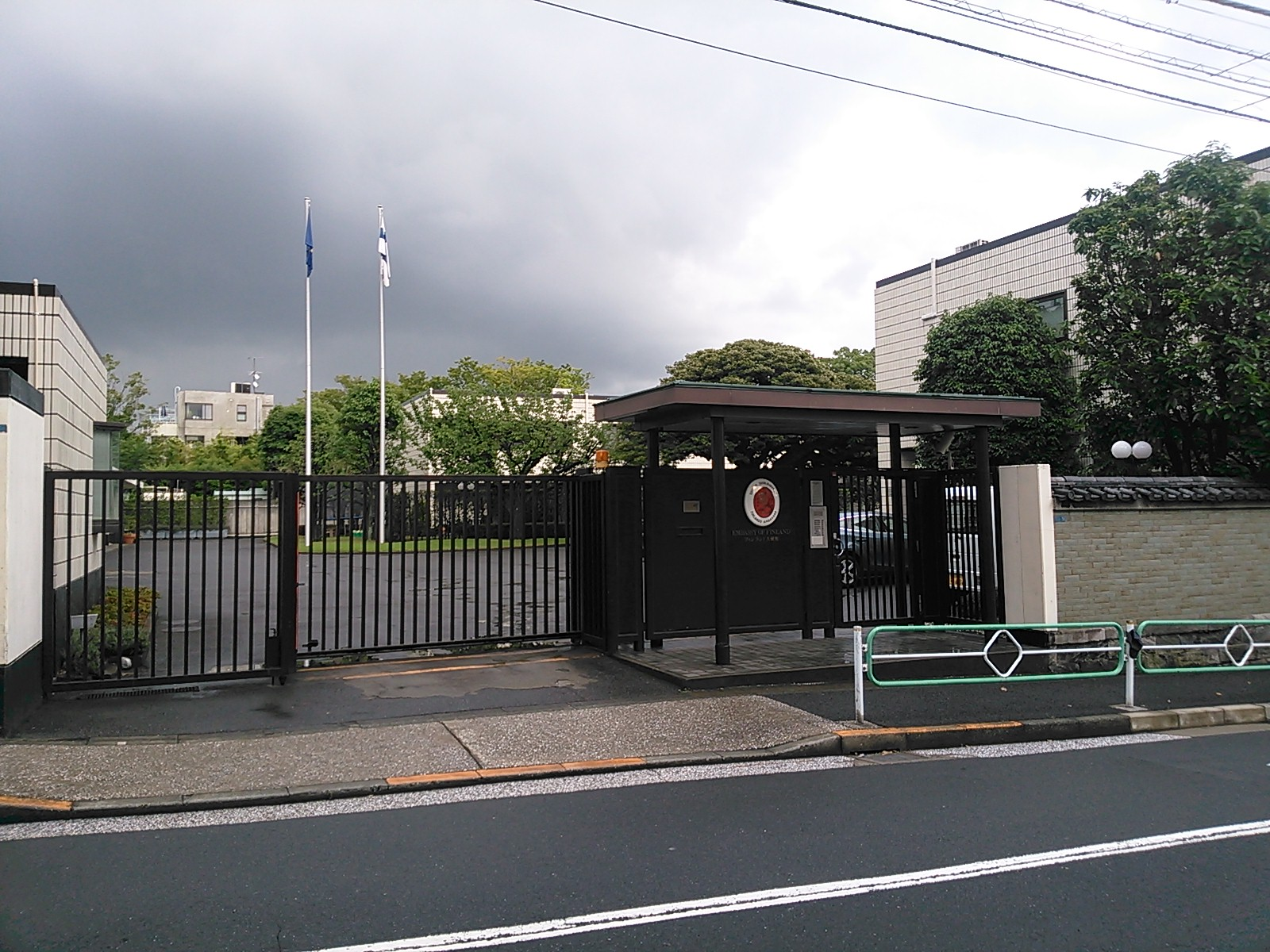
Embassy in Tokyo

=== Europe ===
Host country	Host city	Mission	Concurrent accreditation	Ref.
Austria	Vienna	Embassy	Multilateral Organizations: United Nations; International Atomic Energy Agency; UNIDO	
Belarus	Minsk	Liaison office		
Belgium	Brussels	Embassy	Countries: Luxembourg	
Bulgaria	Sofia	Embassy		
Croatia	Zagreb	Embassy	Countries: Bosnia and Herzegovina; Holy See	
Cyprus	Nicosia	Embassy		
Czechia	Prague	Embassy	Countries: Slovakia	
Denmark	Copenhagen	Embassy		
Estonia	Tallinn	Embassy		
France	Paris	Embassy	Countries: Monaco	
Germany	Berlin	Embassy		
Greece	Athens	Embassy	Countries: Albania	
Hungary	Budapest	Embassy	Countries: Slovenia	
Iceland	Reykjavík	Embassy		
Ireland	Dublin	Embassy		
Italy	Rome	Embassy	Countries: Malta; San Marino; Multilateral Organizations: Food and Agriculture Organization; World Food Programme; International Fund for Agricultural Development	
Kosovo	Pristina	Embassy		
Latvia	Riga	Embassy		
Lithuania	Vilnius	Embassy		
Netherlands	The Hague	Embassy	Multilateral Organizations: Organisation for the Prohibition of Chemical Weapons	
Norway	Oslo	Embassy		
Poland	Warsaw	Embassy		
Portugal	Lisbon	Embassy	Countries: Cape Verde	
Romania	Bucharest	Embassy	Countries: Moldova	
Russia	Moscow	Embassy		
Serbia	Belgrade	Embassy	Countries: Montenegro; North Macedonia	
Spain	Madrid	Embassy	Countries: Andorra	
Sweden	Stockholm	Embassy		
Switzerland	Bern	Embassy	Countries: Liechtenstein	
Ukraine	Kyiv	Embassy		
United Kingdom	London	Embassy		

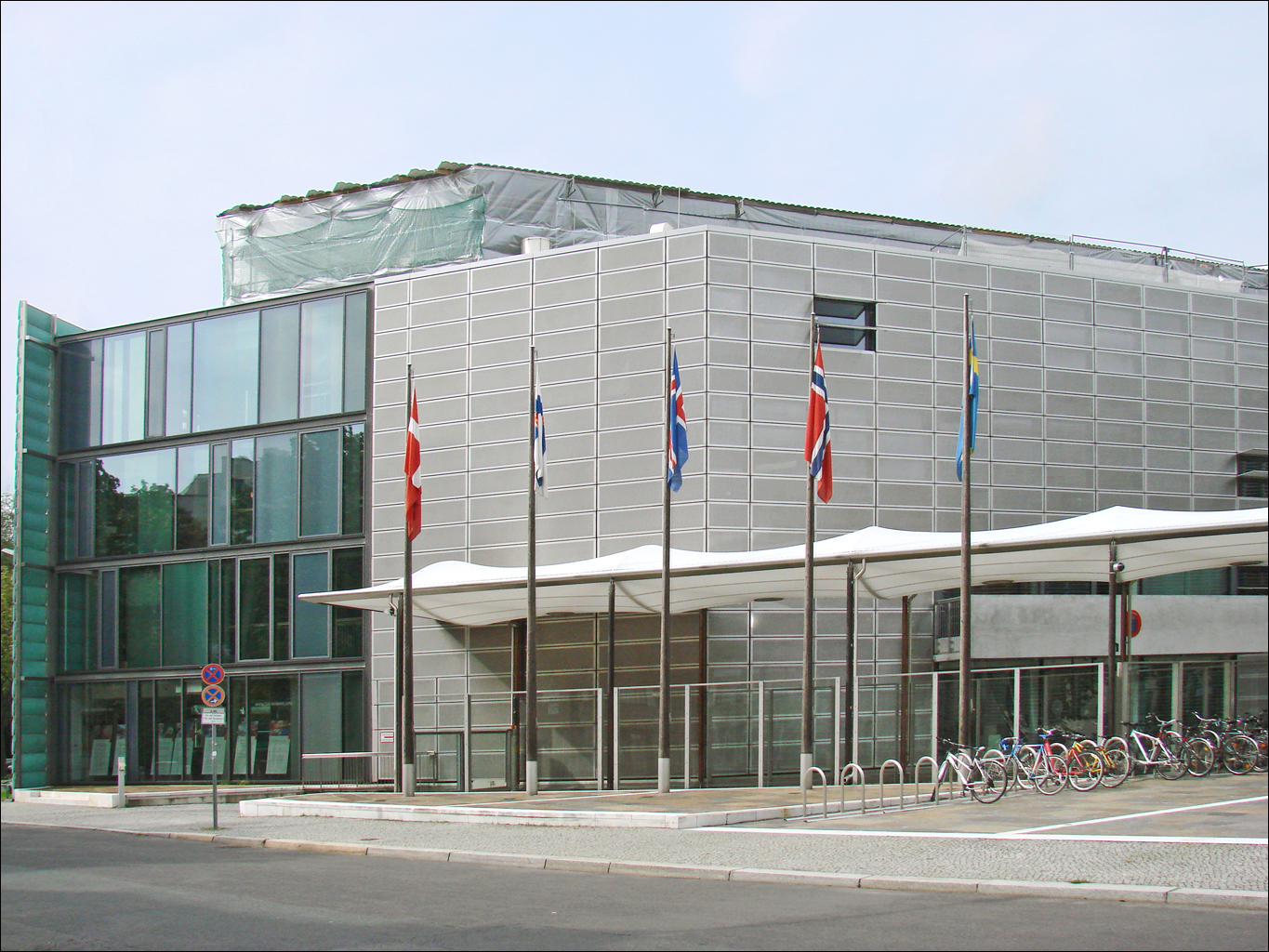
Embassy in Berlin

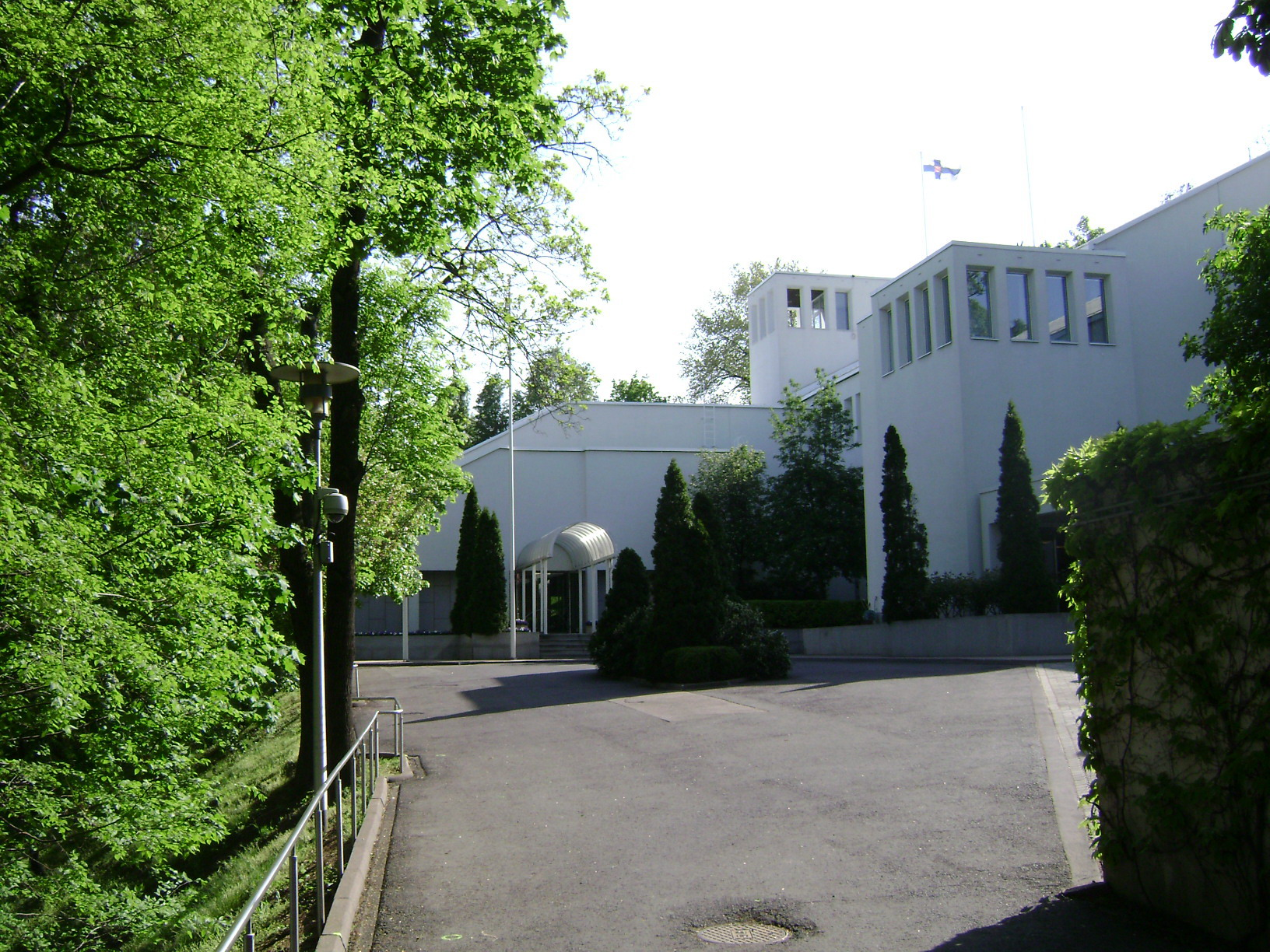
Embassy in Budapest

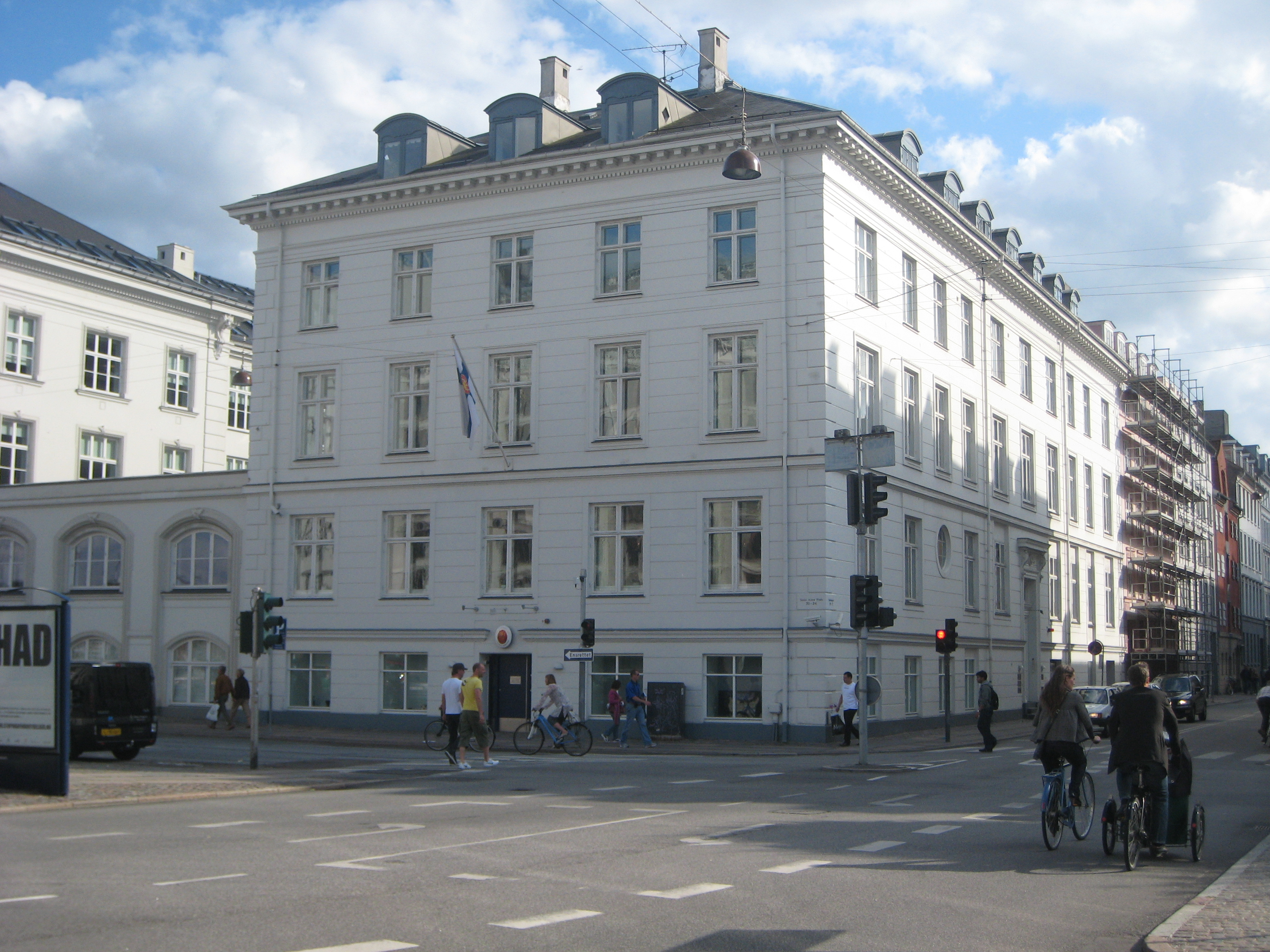
Embassy in Copenhagen

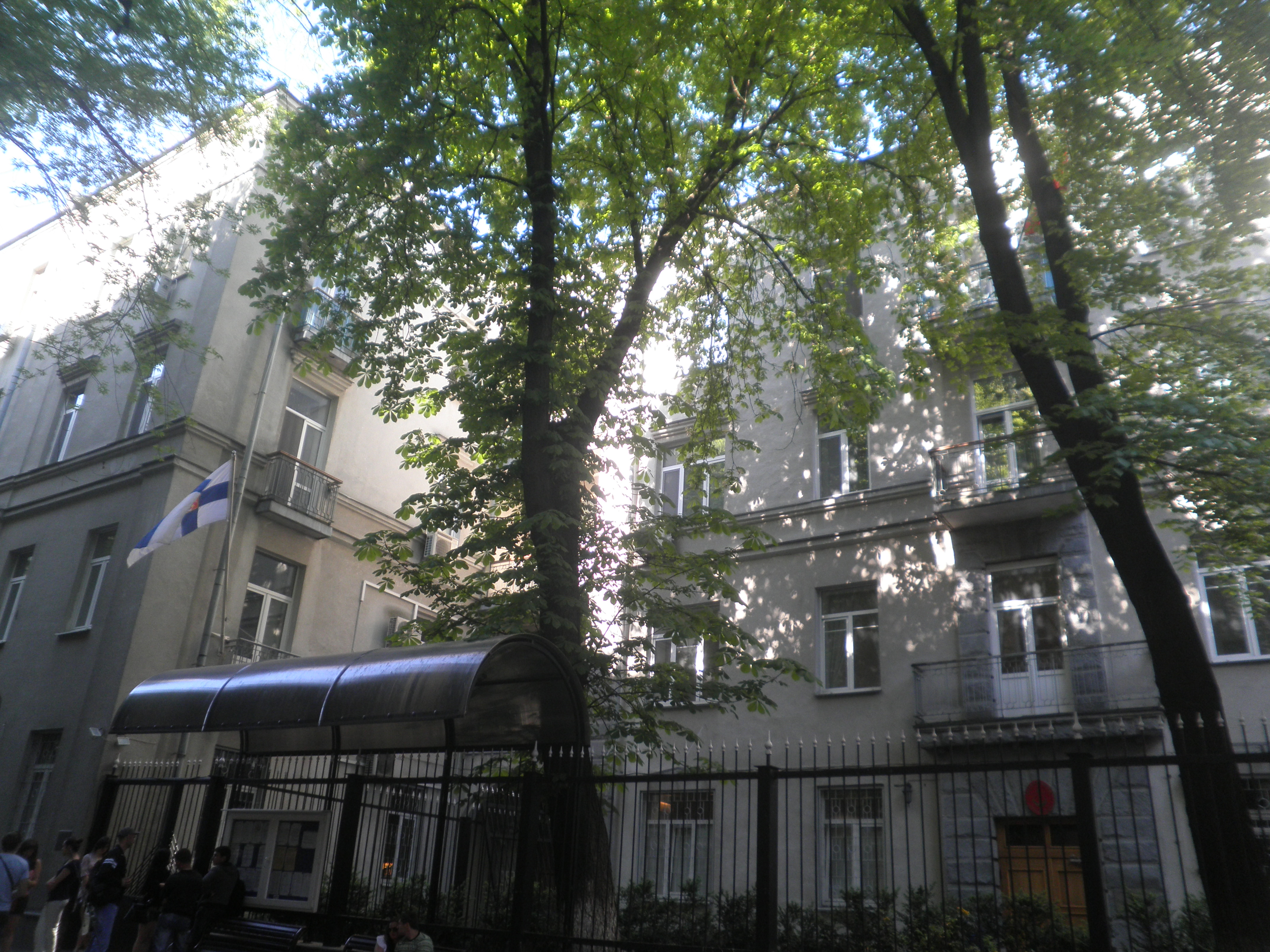
Embassy in Kyiv

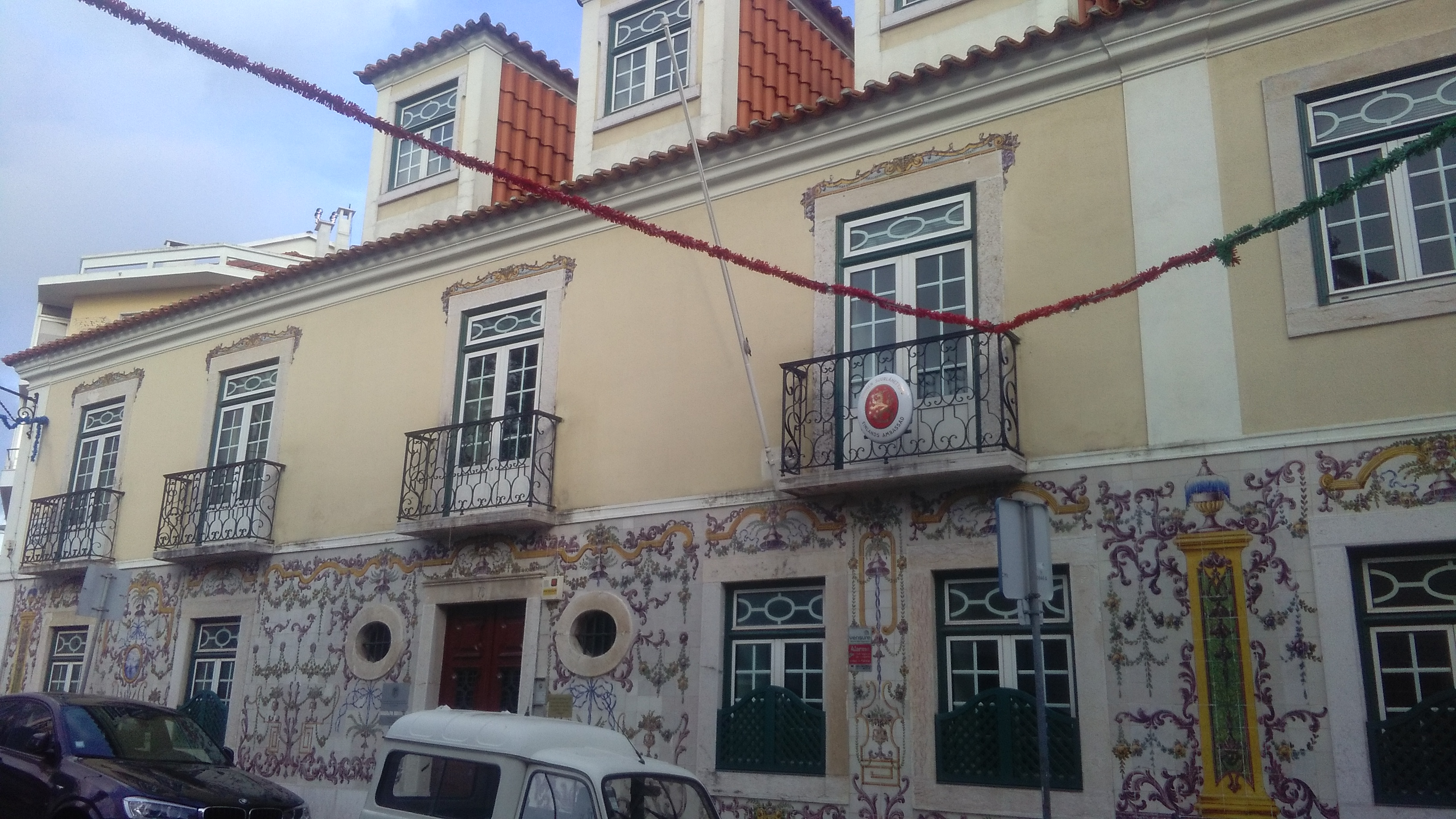
Embassy in Lisbon

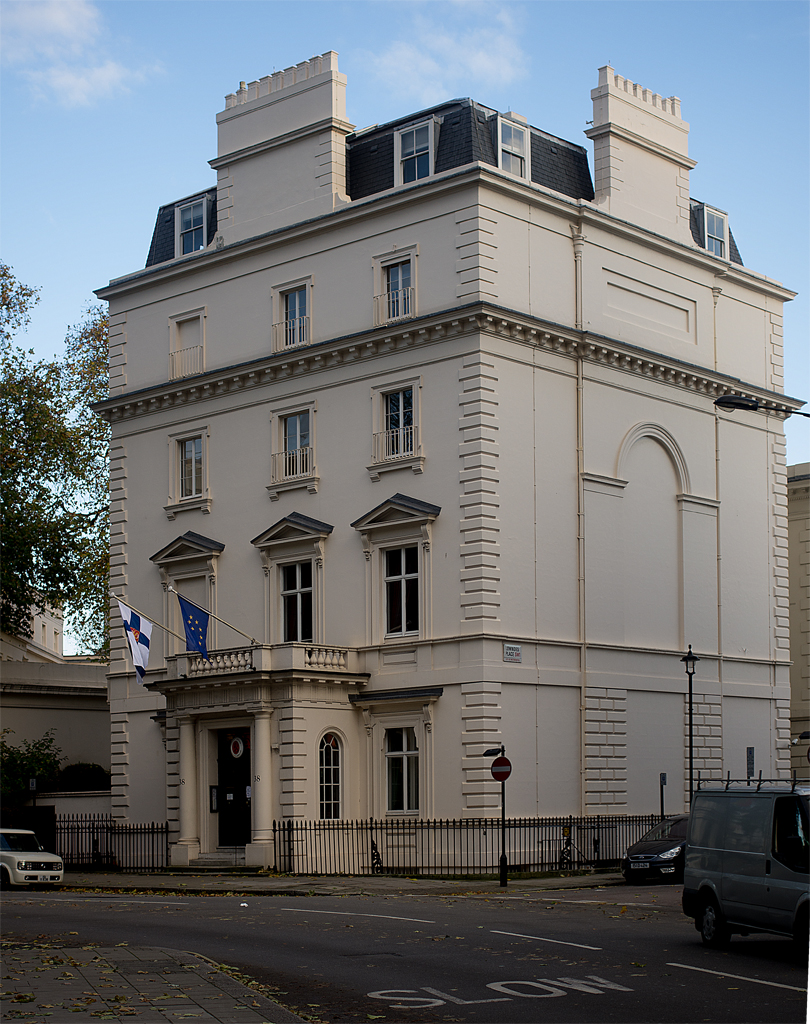
Embassy in London

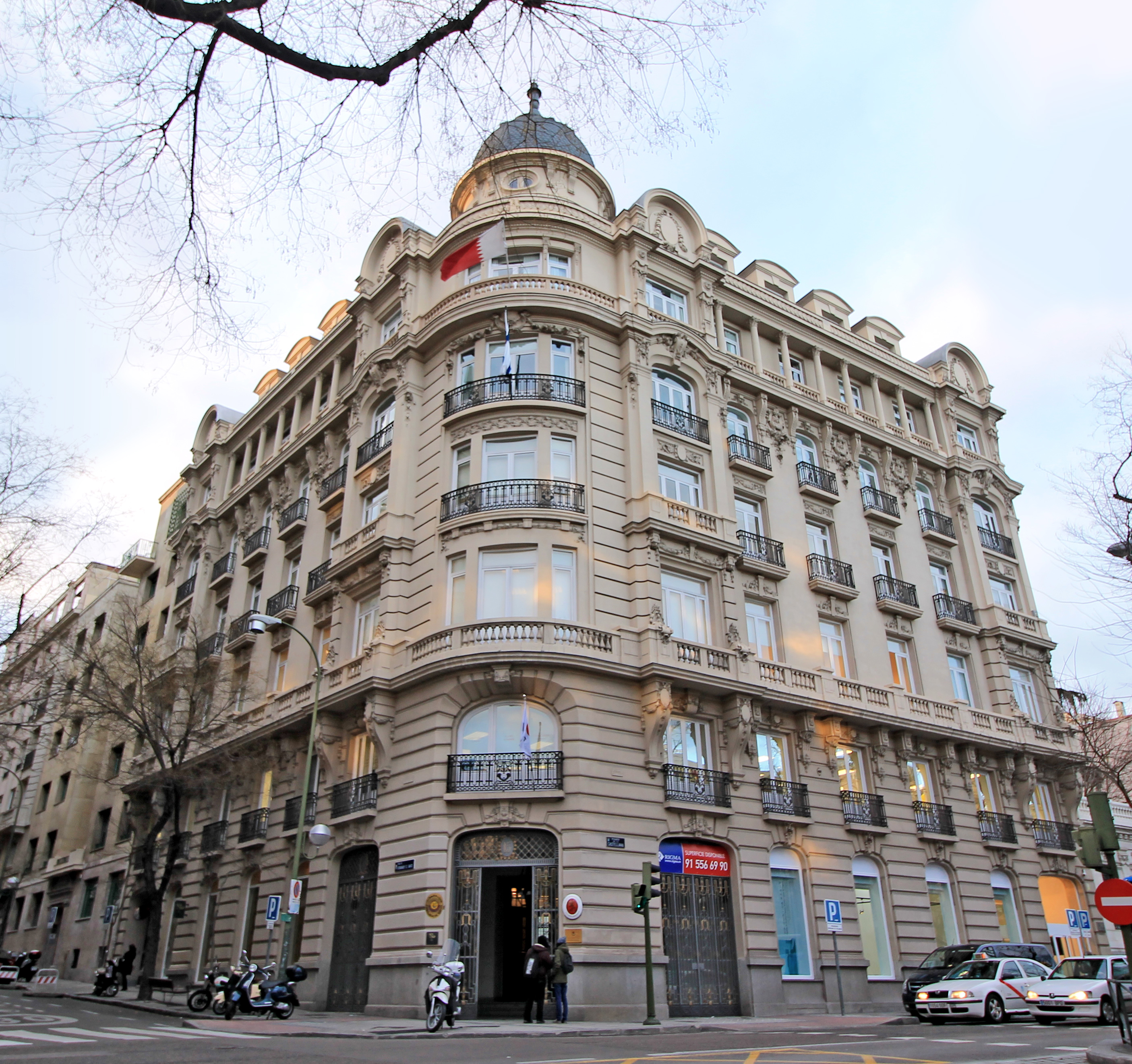
Building hosting the Embassy in Madrid

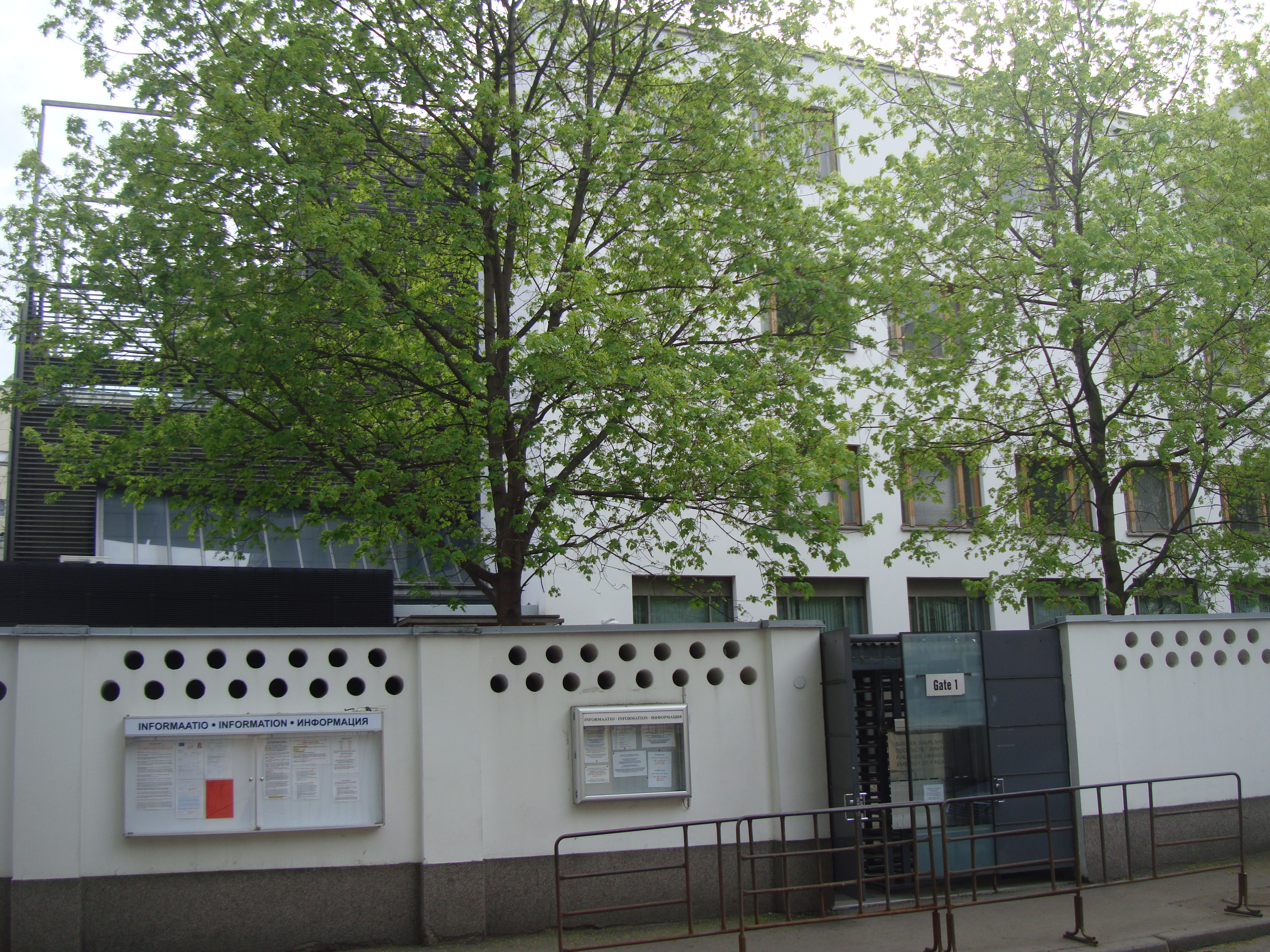
Embassy in Moscow

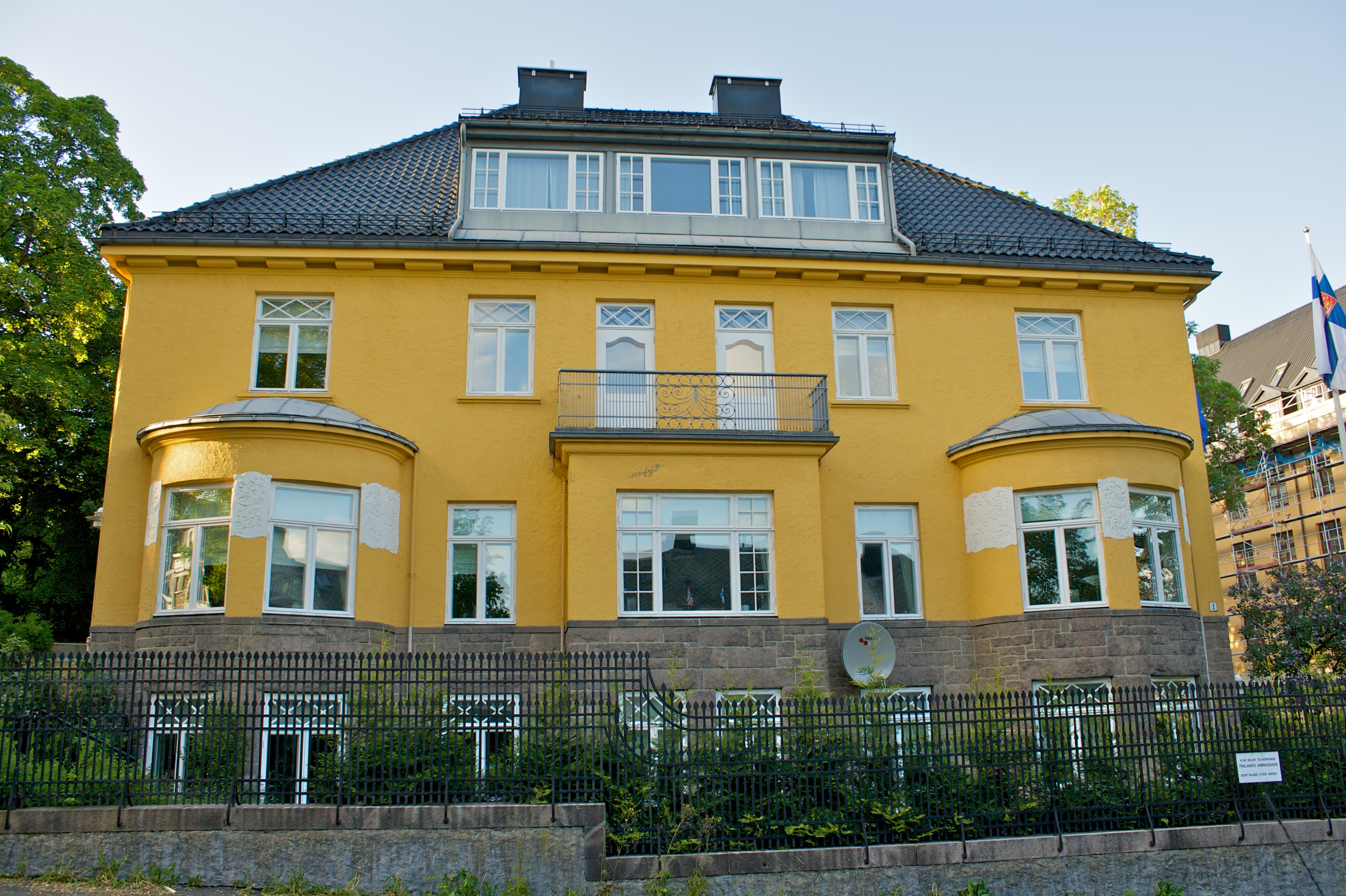
Embassy in Oslo

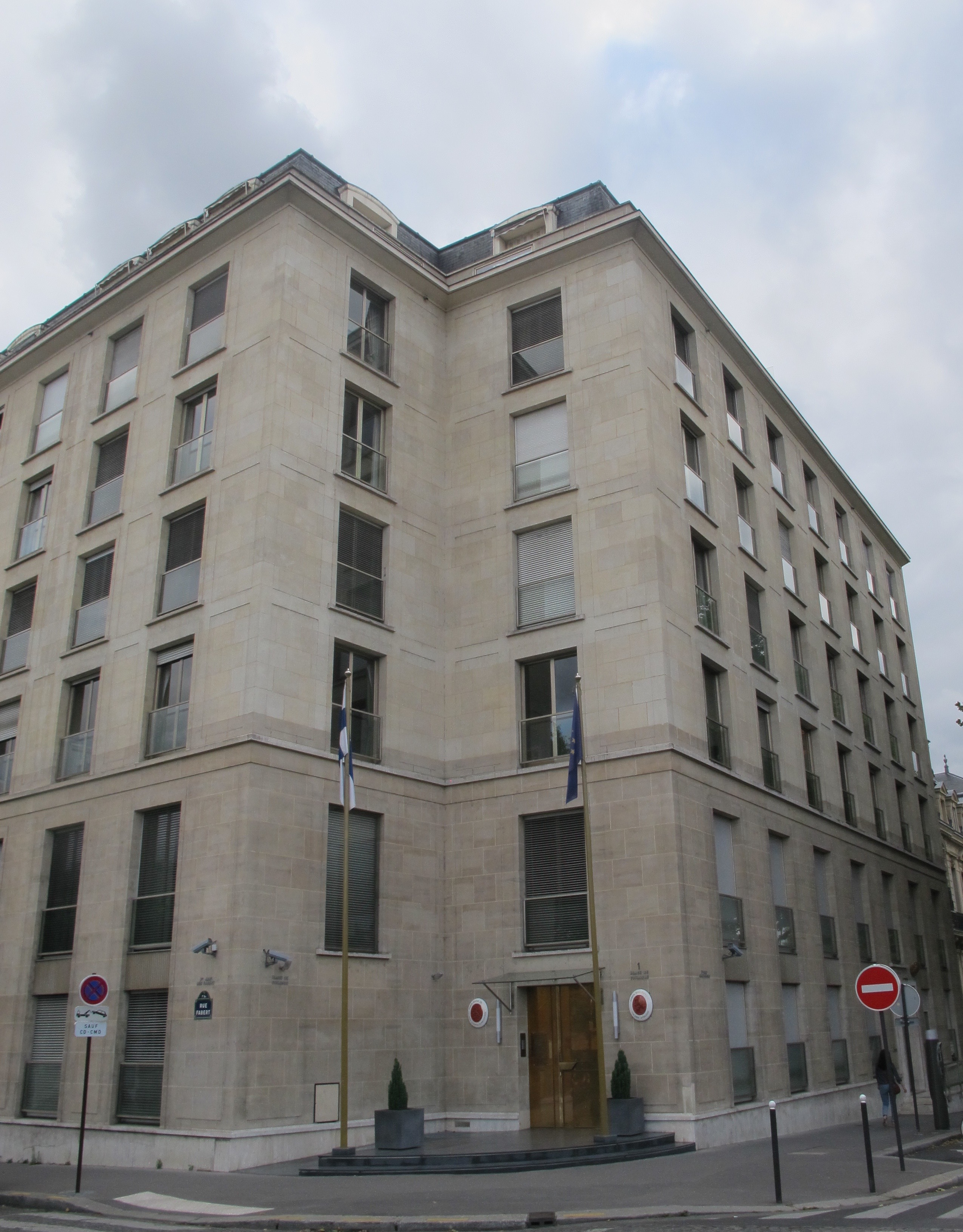
Embassy in Paris

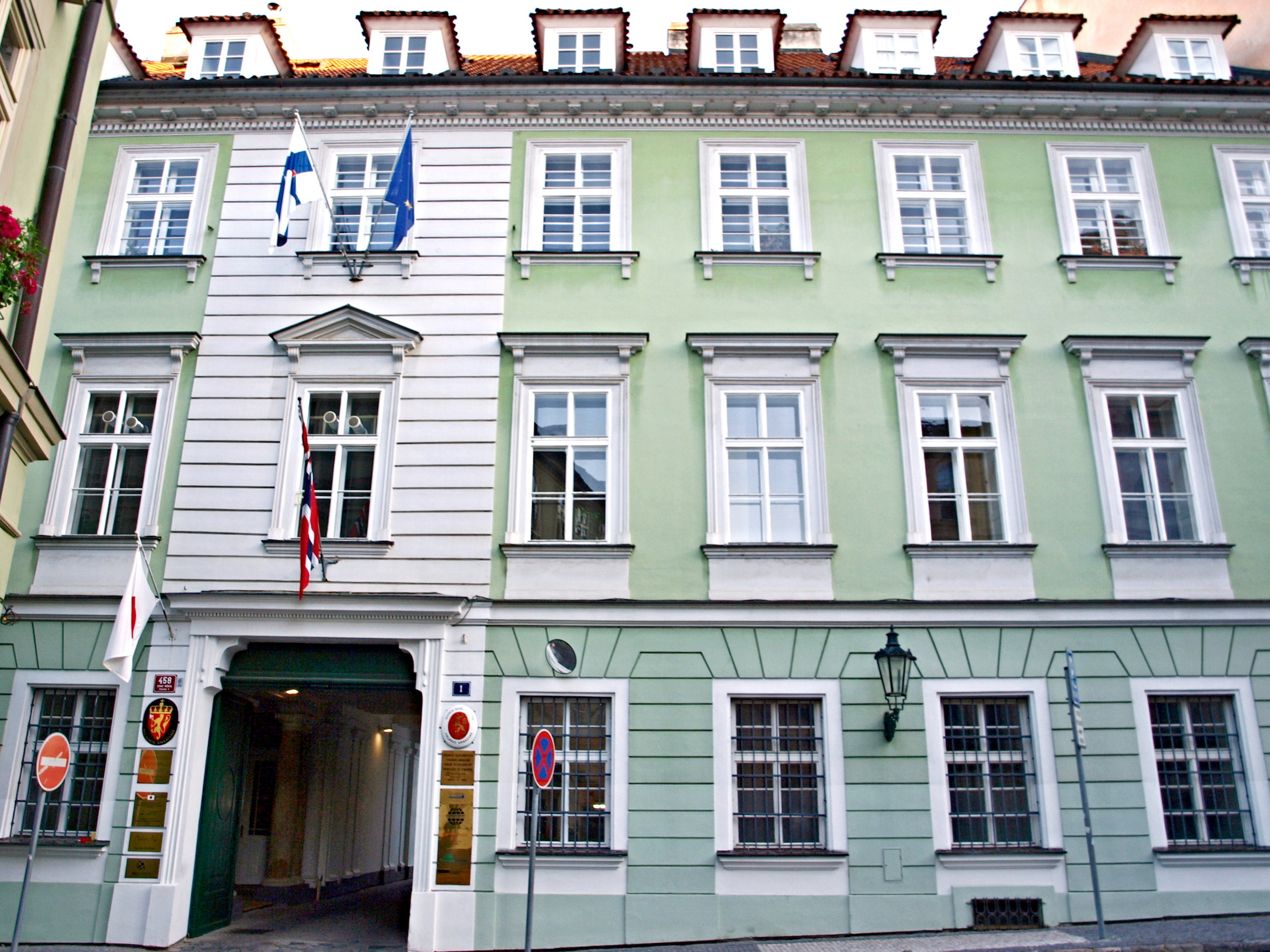
Embassy in Prague

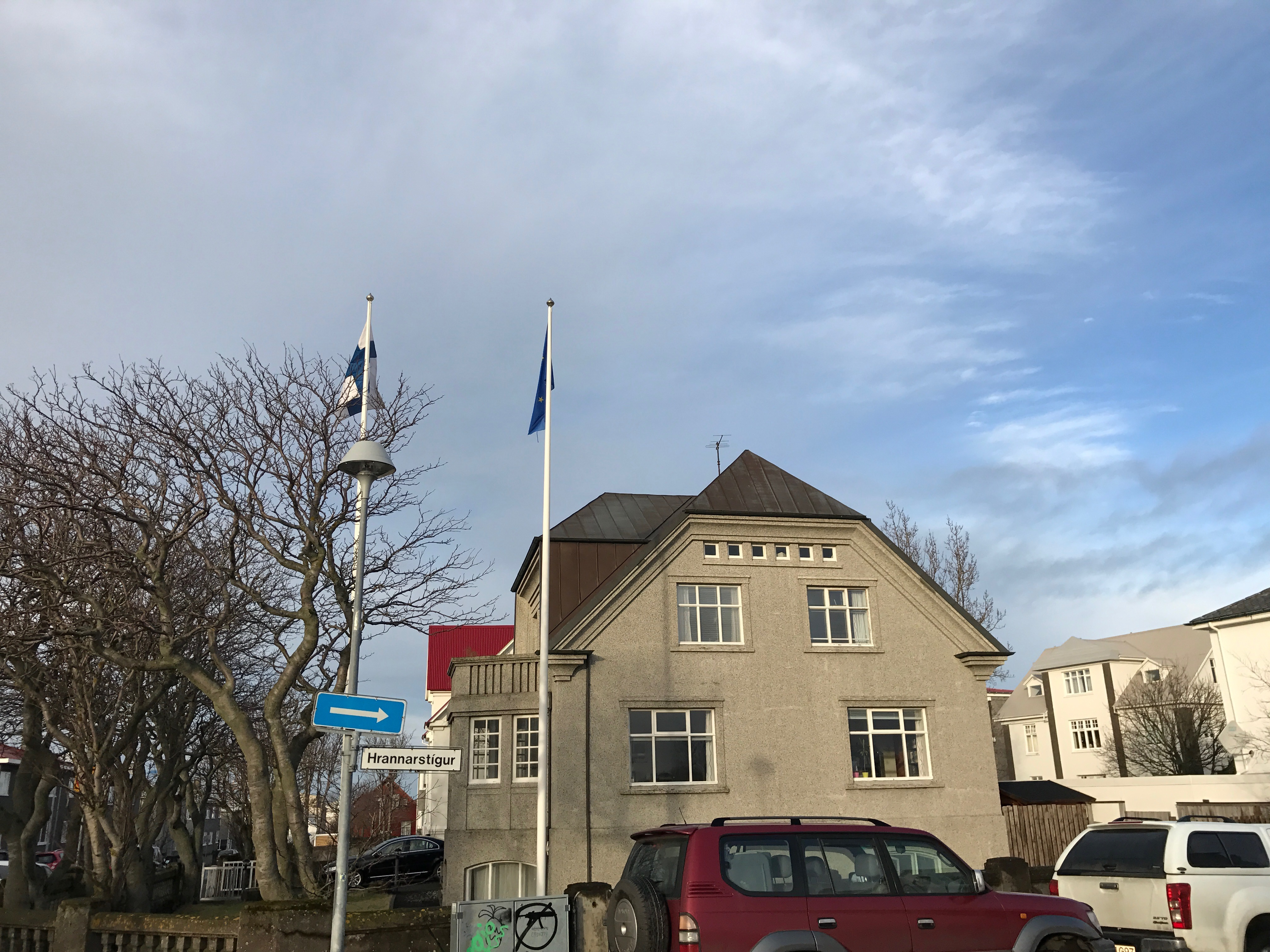
Embassy in Reykjavík

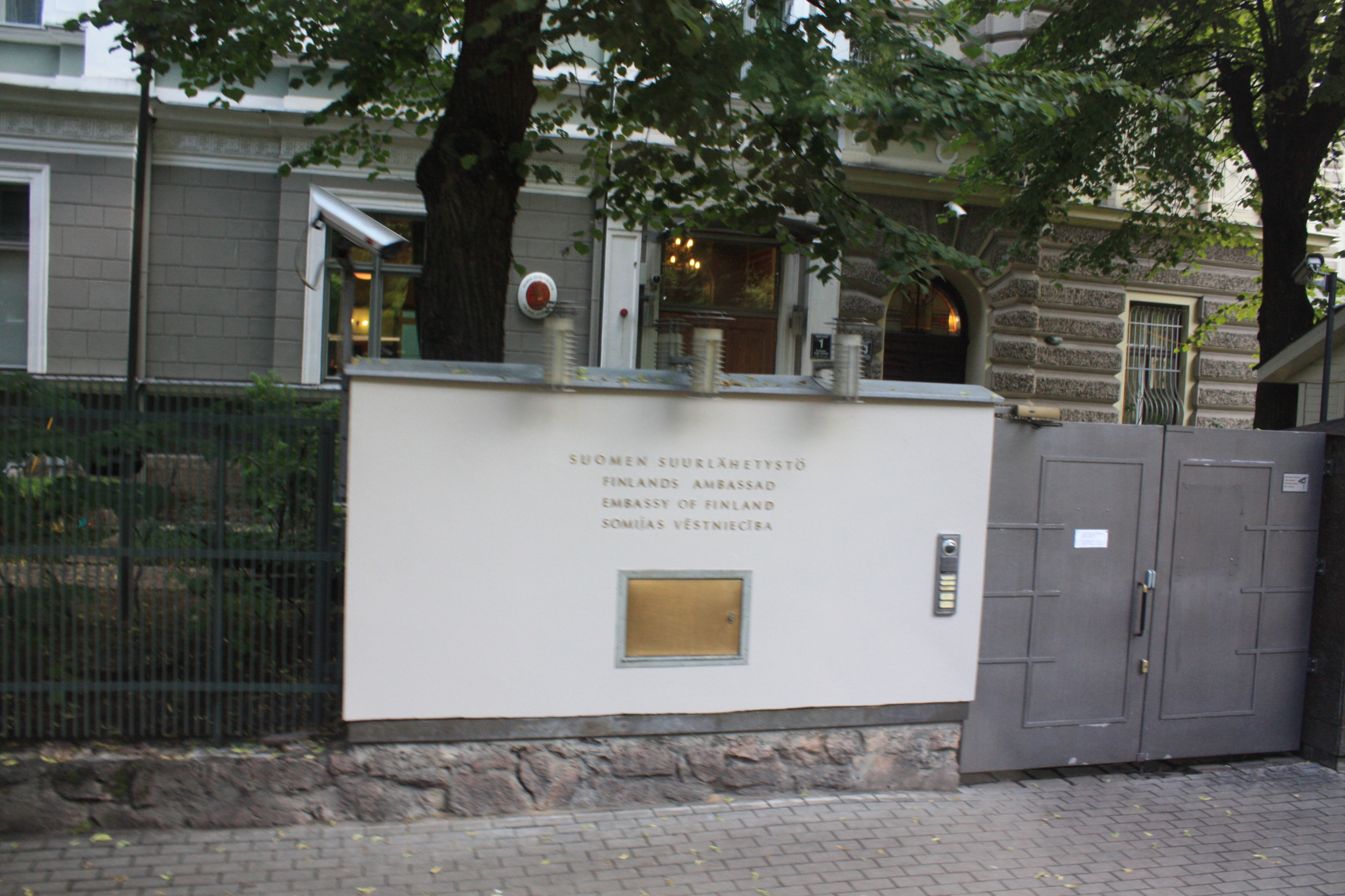
Embassy in Riga

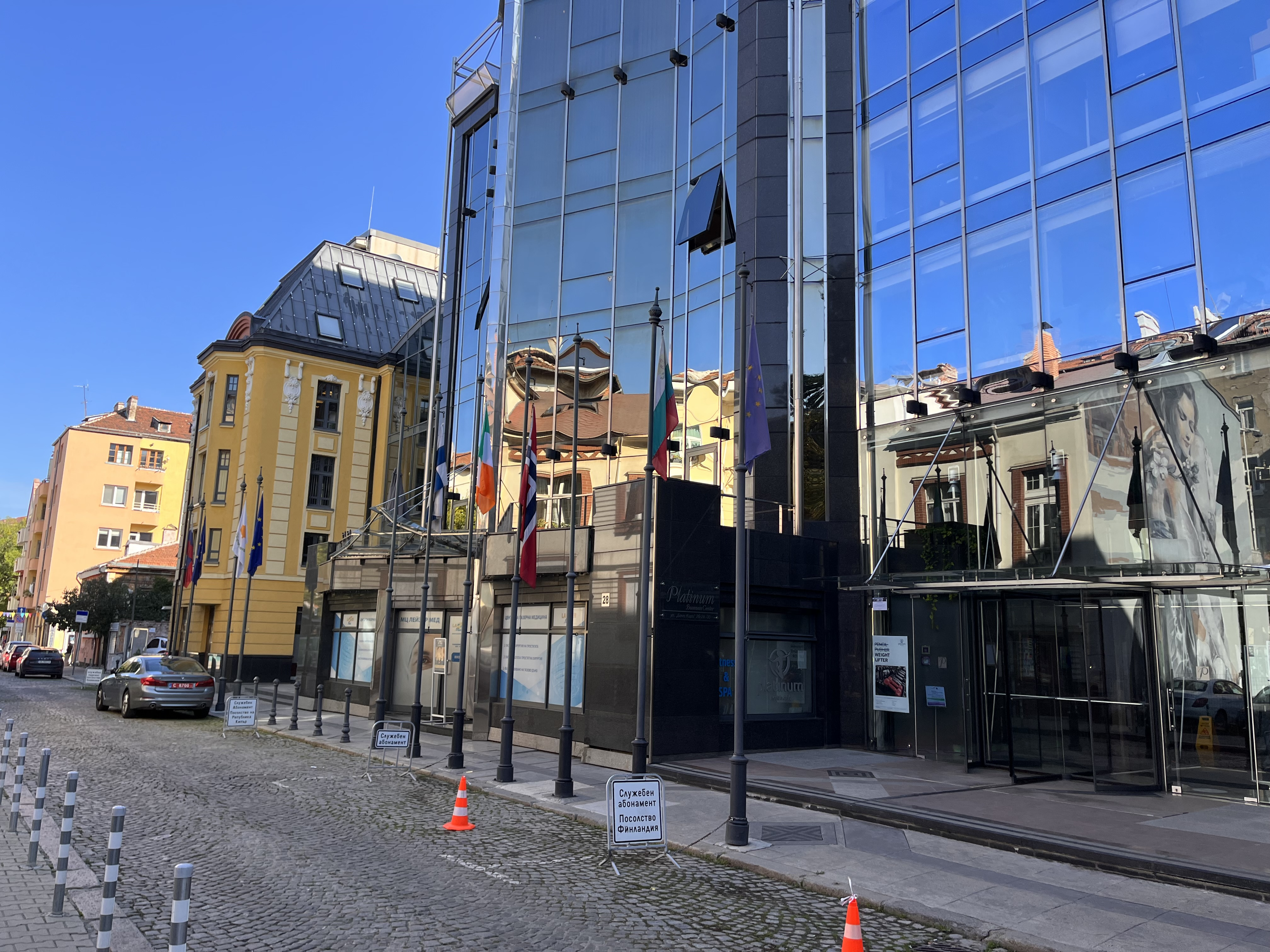
Embassy in Sofia

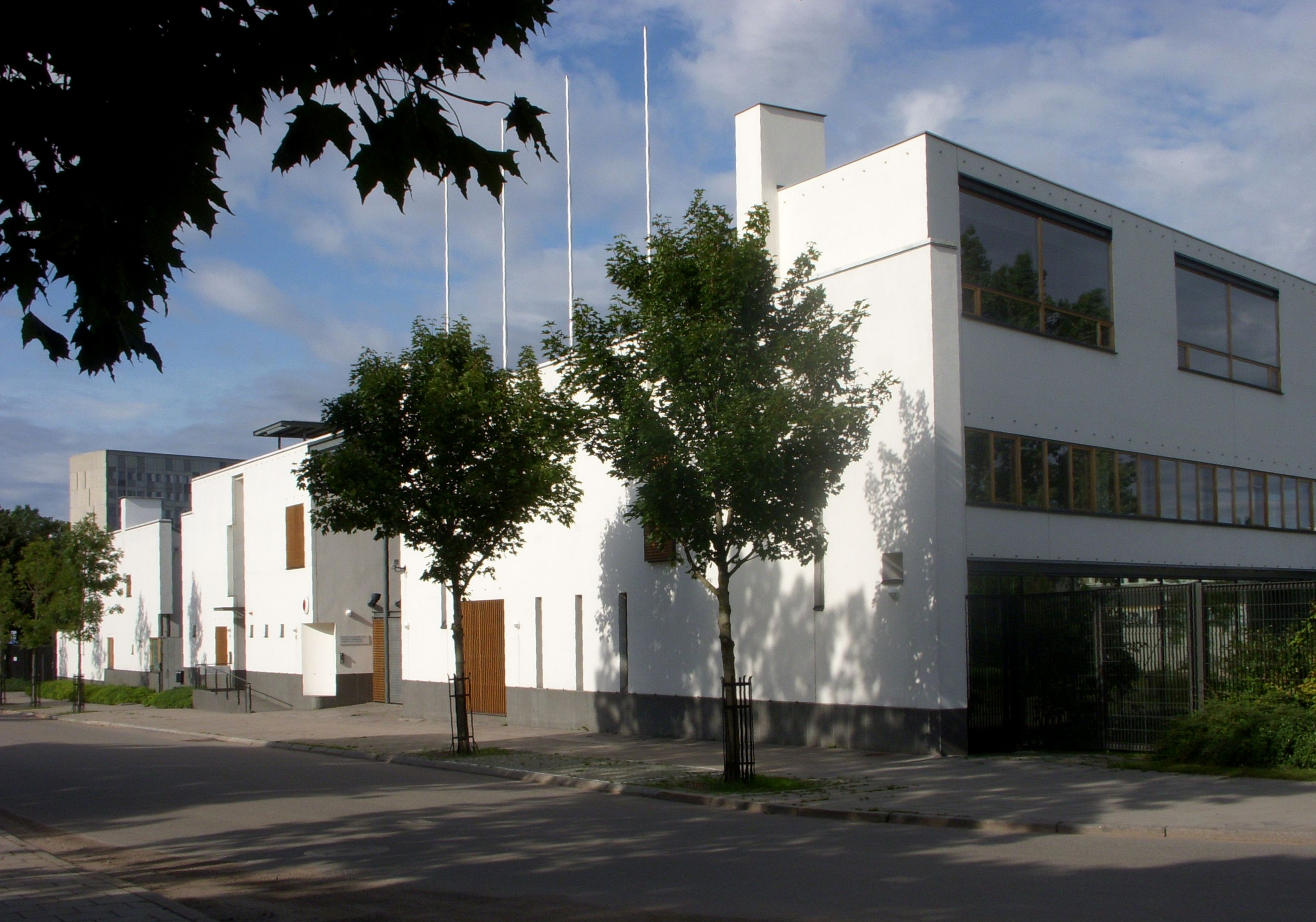
Embassy in Stockholm

Embassy in Tallinn

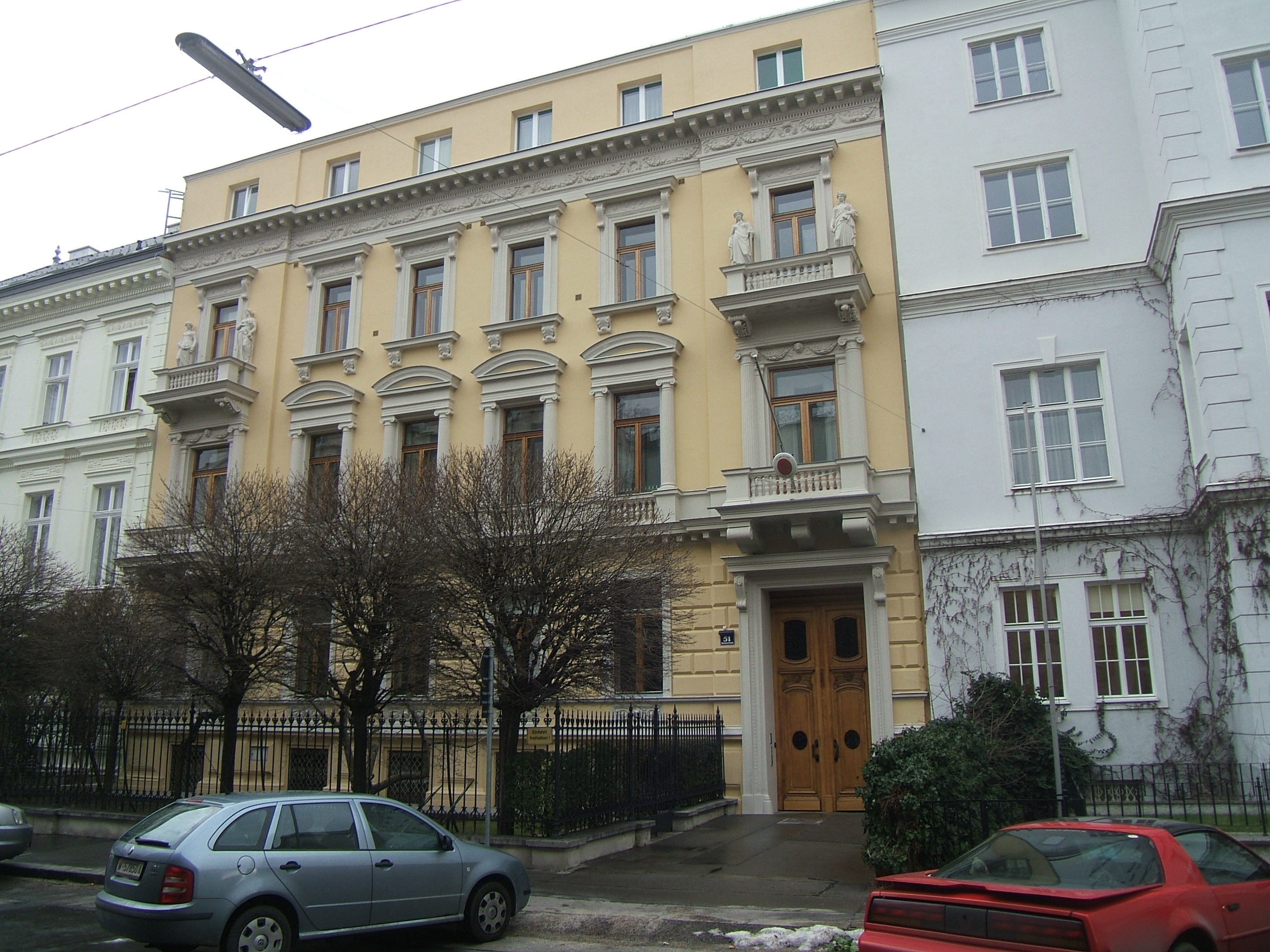
Embassy in Vienna

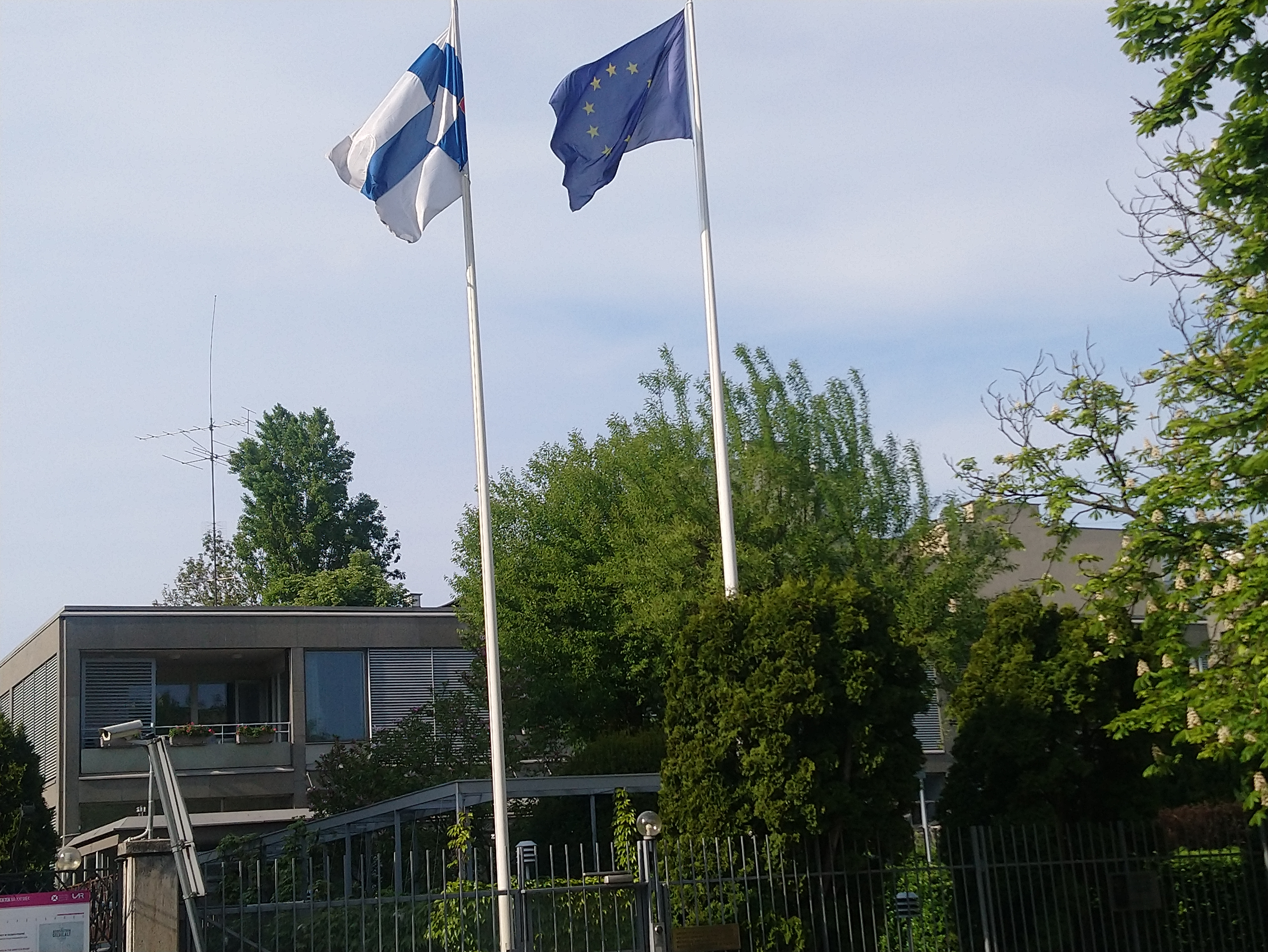
Embassy in Warsaw

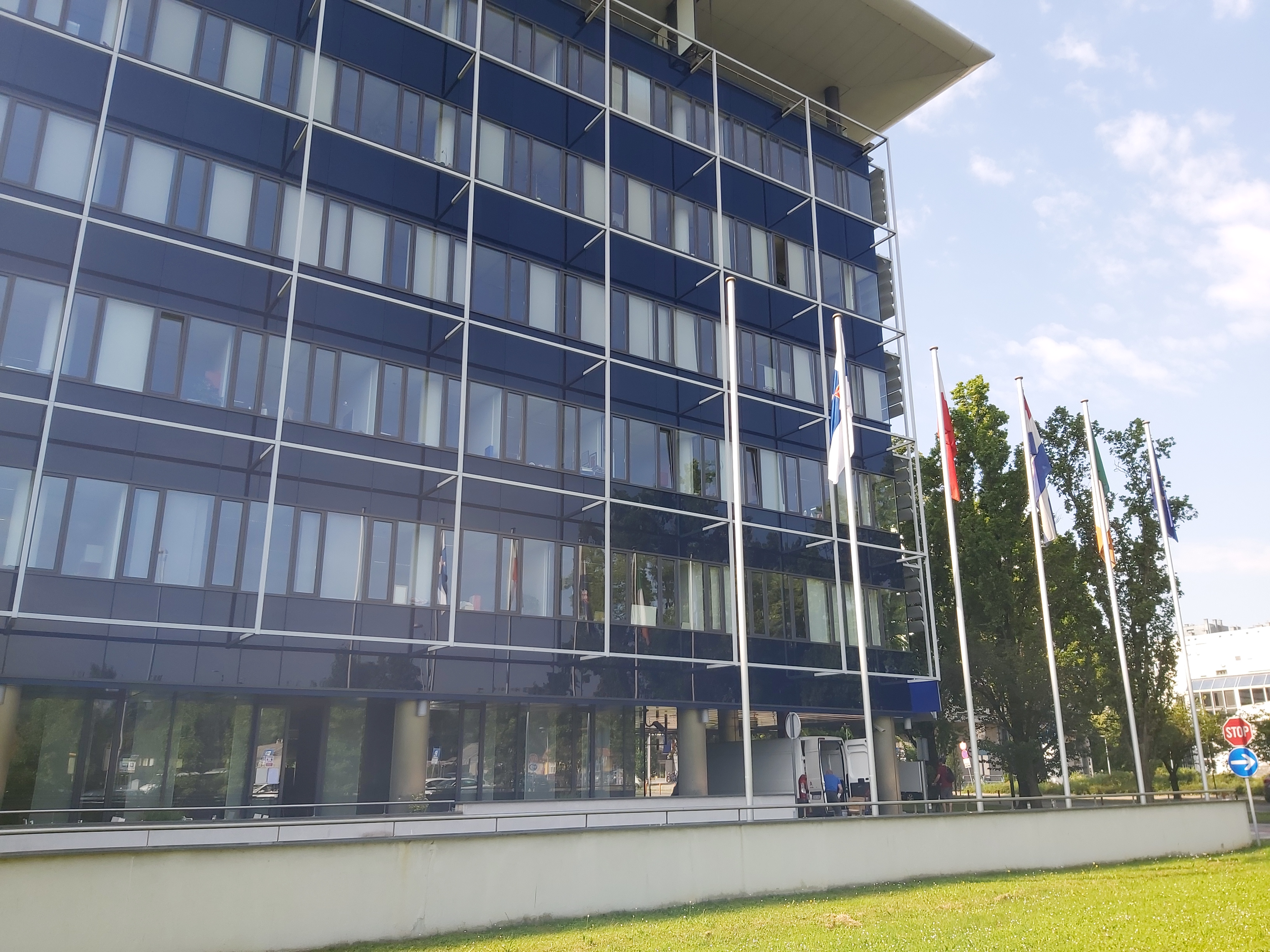
Embassy in Zagreb

=== Oceania ===
Host country	Host city	Mission	Concurrent accreditation	Ref.
Australia	Canberra	Embassy	Countries: Fiji; New Zealand; Papua New Guinea; Samoa; Solomon Islands; Tonga; Vanuatu	

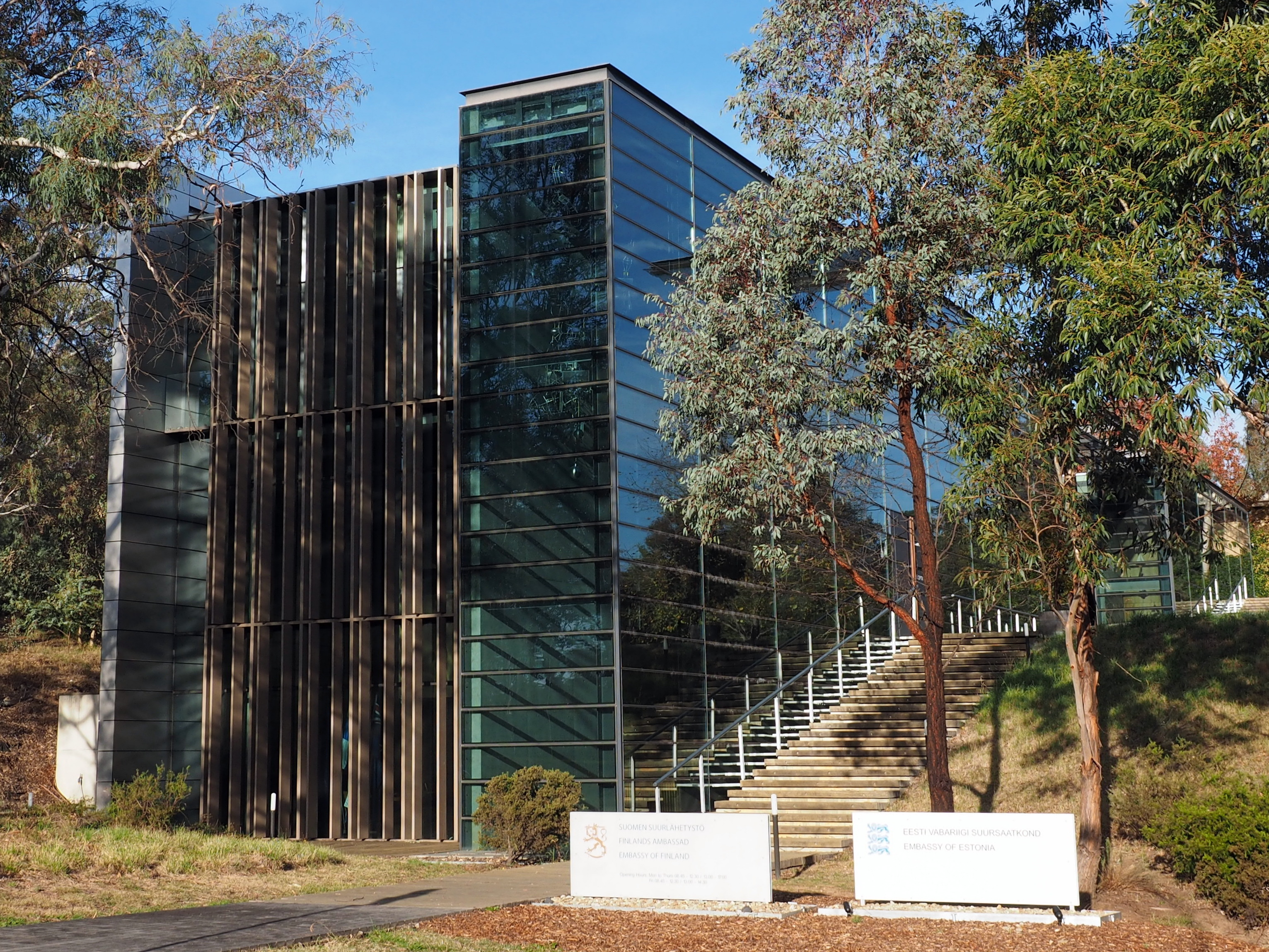
Embassy in Canberra

=== Multilateral organizations ===
Organization	Host city	Host country	Mission	Concurrent accreditation	Ref.
Council of Europe	Strasbourg	France	Permanent Representation		
European Union	Brussels	Belgium	Permanent Mission		
NATO	Brussels	Belgium	Permanent Representation		
Organisation for Economic Co-operation and Development	Paris	France	Permanent Delegation	Multilateral Organizations: UNESCO	
Organization for Security and Co-operation in Europe	Vienna	Austria	Permanent Delegation		
United Nations	New York City	United States	Permanent Mission		
United Nations	Geneva	Switzerland	Permanent Mission	Multilateral Organizations: Conference on Disarmament; International Labour Organization; World Health Organization; World Trade Organization	

== Closed missions ==
=== Africa ===
Host country	Host city	Mission	Year closed	Ref.
Libya	Tripoli	Embassy	2003	
South Africa	Cape Town	Embassy branch office	2011	
Zimbabwe	Harare	Embassy	2002	

=== Americas ===
Host country	Host city	Mission	Year closed	Ref.
Nicaragua	Managua	Embassy	2013	
Venezuela	Caracas	Embassy	2011	

=== Asia ===
Host country	Host city	Mission	Year closed	Ref.
Afghanistan	Kabul	Embassy	2021 (Note: Temporarily closed in 2021 in the midst of the fall of Kabul to the Taliban; will be permanently closed in 2026.)	
China	Guangzhou	Consulate-General	2012	
Kuwait	Kuwait City	Embassy	2003	
Pakistan	Islamabad	Embassy	2026	
Syria	Damascus	Embassy	2012	
Myanmar	Yangon	Embassy	2026	

=== Europe ===
Host country	Host city	Mission	Year closed	Ref.
Germany	Hamburg	Consulate-General	2013	
Luxembourg	Luxembourg City	Embassy	2015	
Russia	Saint Petersburg	Consulate-General	2023	
Russia	Murmansk	Consulate-General branch office	2023	
Russia	Petrozavodsk	Consulate-General branch office	2023	
Slovakia	Bratislava	Embassy	2015	
Slovenia	Ljubljana	Embassy	2015	
Spain	Las Palmas de Gran Canaria	Consulate	2012	
Sweden	Gothenburg	Consulate	2011	

=== Oceania ===
Host country	Host city	Mission	Year closed	Ref.
Australia	Sydney	Consulate-General	2012	

== See also ==
- Foreign relations of Finland
- List of current ambassadors of Finland
- List of diplomatic missions of the Nordic countries
- List of diplomatic missions in Finland
- Visa policy of the Schengen Area
