= Embassy of Finland, Prague =

Diplomatic mission of Finland to the Czech Republic

Embassy of Finland in Prague
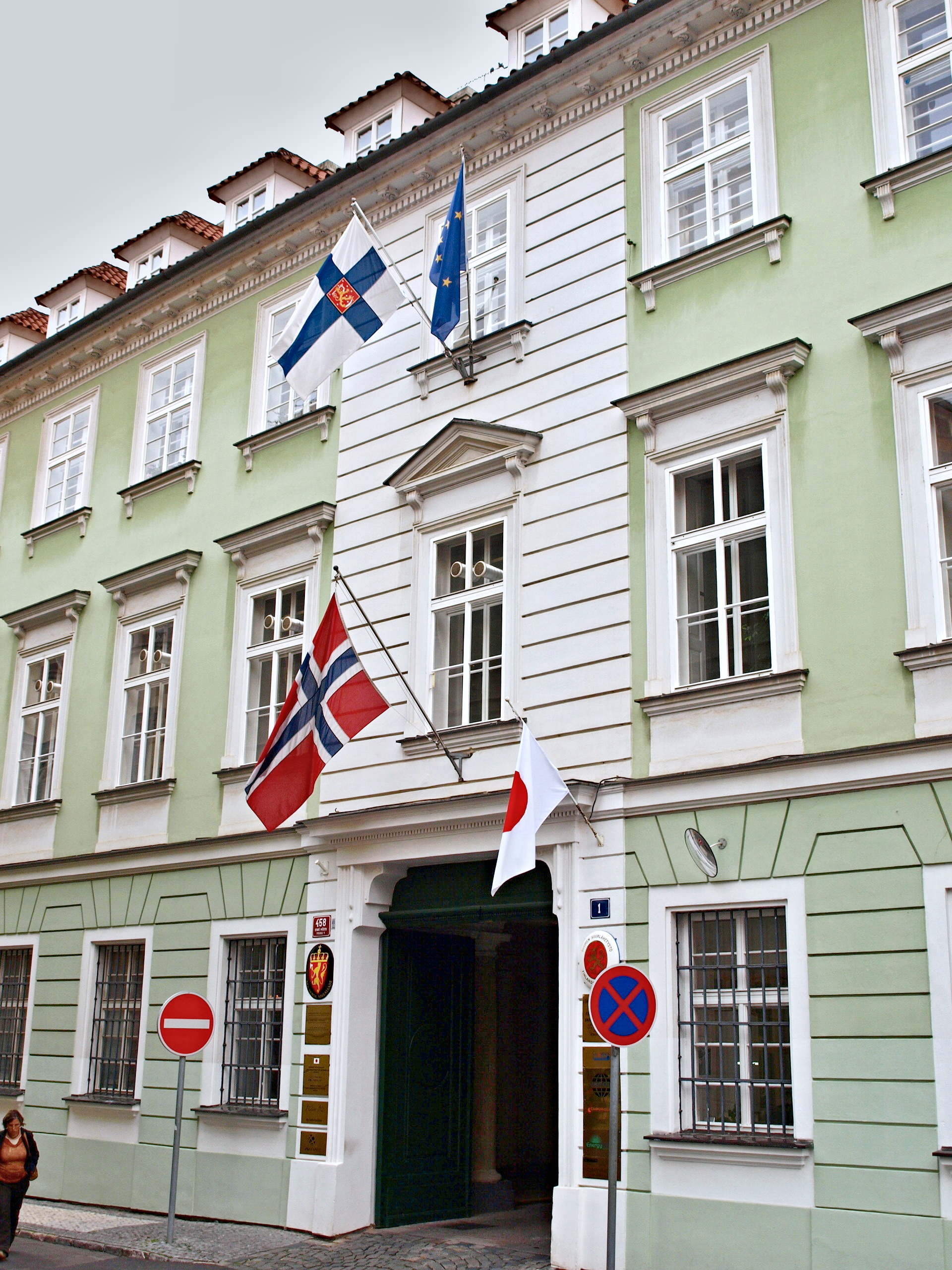
- Location: Prague
- Address: Hellichova 1, 11800 Prague 1
- Coordinates: 50.08425°N 14.40577°E
- Ambassador: Pasi Tuominen

The Finnish Embassy in Prague is Finland's diplomatic mission to the Czech Republic. Since 2022, the embassy has been led by ambassador Pasi Tuominen.

Czechoslovakia recognized Finland's independence on 15 July 1920. Diplomatic relations were formalized in 1927. Finland recognized the Czech Republic in the beginning of 1993; diplomatic relations were established at the same time.

== See also ==
- Foreign relations of the Czech Republic
- Foreign relations of Finland
- List of diplomatic missions of Finland
- List of diplomatic missions of the Czech Republic
