= List of current ambassadors of Finland =

This is a list of current ambassadors from Finland. Note that some ambassadors are responsible for more than one country while others are directly accredited from Helsinki or other capital city.

== Current ambassadors to other countries ==
=== Africa ===
Country	Host City	Type of mission	Ambassador/Head of Mission
Algeria	Algiers	Embassy	Pekka Hyvönen
Cape Verde	Lisbon	Ambassador accredited from Portugal	Christian Lindholm
Egypt	Cairo	Embassy	Riikka Eela
Sudan	Cairo	Ambassador accredited from Egypt	Riikka Eela
Ethiopia	Addis Ababa	Embassy	Sinikka Antila
Djibouti	Addis Ababa	Ambassador accredited from Ethiopia	Sinikka Antila
South Sudan	Addis Ababa	Ambassador accredited from Ethiopia	Sinikka Antila
Kenya	Nairobi	Embassy	Riina-Riikka Heikka
Uganda	Nairobi	Ambassador accredited from Kenya	Riina-Riikka Heikka
Eritrea	Nairobi	Ambassador accredited from Kenya	Riina-Riikka Heikka
Seychelles	Nairobi	Ambassador accredited from Kenya	Riina-Riikka Heikka
Morocco	Rabat	Embassy	Marjaana Sall
Mauritania	Rabat	Ambassador accredited from Morocco	Marjaana Sall
Mozambique	Maputo	Embassy	Satu Lassila
Angola	Maputo	Ambassador accredited from Mozambique	Satu Lassila
Swaziland	Maputo	Ambassador accredited from Mozambique	Satu Lassila
Madagascar	Maputo	Ambassador accredited from Mozambique	Satu Lassila
Namibia	Windhoek	Embassy	Katja Kalamäki
Nigeria	Abuja	Embassy	Sanna Selin
Benin	Abuja	Ambassador accredited from Nigeria	Sanna Selin
Ghana	Abuja	Ambassador accredited from Nigeria	Sanna Selin
Liberia	Abuja	Ambassador accredited from Nigeria	Sanna Selin
Senegal	Dakar	Embassy	Katja Ahlfors
Gambia	Dakar	Ambassador accredited from Senegal	Katja Ahlfors
Ivory Coast	Dakar	Ambassador accredited from Senegal	Katja Ahlfors
South Africa	Pretoria	Embassy	Pekka Metso
Botswana	Pretoria	Ambassador accredited from South Africa	Pekka Metso
Lesotho	Pretoria	Ambassador accredited from South Africa	Pekka Metso
Mauritius	Pretoria	Ambassador accredited from South Africa	Pekka Metso
Tanzania	Dar es Salaam	Embassy	Theresa Zitting
Burundi	Dar es Salaam	Ambassador accredited from Tanzania	Theresa Zitting
Rwanda	Dar es Salaam	Ambassador accredited from Tanzania	Theresa Zitting
Tunisia	Tunis	Embassy	Teemu Sepponen
Libya	Tunis	Ambassador accredited from Tunisia	Teemu Sepponen
Zambia	Lusaka	Embassy	Saana Halinen
Congo-Kinshasa	Lusaka	Ambassador accredited from Zambia	Saana Halinen
Malawi	Lusaka	Ambassador accredited from Zambia	Saana Halinen
Zimbabwe	Lusaka	Ambassador accredited from Zambia	Saana Halinen

=== Asia ===
Country	Host City	Type of mission	Ambassador/Head of Mission
Armenia	Helsinki	Roving Ambassador for the South Caucasus, accredited from Helsinki	Kirsti Narinen
Azerbaijan	Helsinki	Roving Ambassador for the South Caucasus, accredited from Helsinki	Kirsti Narinen
Georgia	Helsinki	Roving Ambassador for the South Caucasus, accredited from Helsinki	Kirsti Narinen
China	Beijing	Embassy	Mikko Kinnunen
Mongolia	Beijing	Ambassador accredited from China	Mikko Kinnunen
India	New Delhi	Embassy	Kimmo Lähdevirta
Bangladesh	New Delhi	Ambassador accredited from India	Kimmo Lähdevirta
Bhutan	New Delhi	Ambassador accredited from India	Kimmo Lähdevirta
Maldives	New Delhi	Ambassador accredited from India	Kimmo Lähdevirta
Sri Lanka	New Delhi	Ambassador accredited from India	Kimmo Lähdevirta
Indonesia	Jakarta	Embassy	Pekka Kaihilahti
Timor-Leste	Jakarta	Ambassador accredited from Indonesia	Pekka Kaihilahti
Iran	Tehran	Embassy	Jani Raappana
Iraq	Beirut	Baghdad	Antti Putkonen
Israel	Tel Aviv	Embassy	Nina Nordström
Japan	Tokyo	Embassy	Tanja Jääskeläinen
Kazakhstan	Astana	Embassy	Janne Heiskanen
Kyrgyzstan	Astana	Ambassador accredited from Kazakhstan	Janne Heiskanen
Lebanon	Beirut	Embassy	Anne Meskanen
Jordan	Beirut	Ambassador accredited from Lebanon	Anne Meskanen
Syria	Beirut	Ambassador accredited from Lebanon	Anne Meskanen
Malaysia	Kuala Lumpur	Embassy	Anne Vasara
Brunei	Kuala Lumpur	Ambassador accredited from Malaysia	Anne Vasara
Nepal	Katmandu	Embassy	Petri Puhakka
Pakistan	Islamabad	Embassy	Hannu Ripatti
Philippines	Manila	Embassy	Saija Nurminen
Qatar	Doha	Embassy	Juha Mustonen
Kuwait	Doha	Ambassador accredited from Qatar	Juha Mustonen
Saudi Arabia	Riyadh	Embassy	Anu-Eerika Viljanen
Oman	Riyadh	Ambassador accredited from Saudi Arabia	Anu-Eerika Viljanen
Yemen	Riyadh	Ambassador accredited from Saudi Arabia	Anu-Eerika Viljanen
Singapore	Singapore	Embassy	Juha Markkanen
South Korea	Seoul	Embassy	Jyri Järviaho
North Korea	Seoul	Ambassador accredited from South Korea	Jyri Järviaho
Tajikistan	Helsinki	Roving Ambassador to Central Asia, accredited from Helsinki	Ilkka Räisänen
Turkmenistan	Helsinki	Roving Ambassador to Central Asia, accredited from Helsinki	Ilkka Räisänen
Uzbekistan	Helsinki	Roving Ambassador to Central Asia, accredited from Helsinki	Ilkka Räisänen
Thailand	Bangkok	Embassy	Kristiina Kuvaja-Xanthopoulos
Cambodia	Bangkok	Ambassador accredited from Thailand	Kristiina Kuvaja-Xanthopoulos
Turkey	Ankara	Embassy	Pirkko Hämäläinen
United Arab Emirates	Abu Dhabi	Embassy	Tuula Yrjölä
Bahrain	Abu Dhabi	Ambassador accredited from United Arab Emirates	Tuula Yrjölä
Vietnam	Hanoi	Embassy	Pekka Voutilainen
Laos	Hanoi	Ambassador accredited from Vietnam	Pekka Voutilainen

=== Oceania ===
Country	Host City	Type of mission	Ambassador/Head of Mission
Australia	Canberra	Embassy	Arto Haapea
Fiji	Canberra	Ambassador accredited from Australia	Arto Haapea
Papua New Guinea	Canberra	Ambassador accredited from Australia	Arto Haapea
New Zealand	Canberra	Ambassador accredited from Australia	Arto Haapea
Samoa	Canberra	Ambassador accredited from Australia	Arto Haapea
Solomon Islands	Canberra	Ambassador accredited from Australia	Arto Haapea
Tonga	Canberra	Ambassador accredited from Australia	Arto Haapea
Vanuatu	Canberra	Ambassador accredited from Australia	Arto Haapea
Marshall Islands	Tokyo	Ambassador accredited from Japan	Tanja Jääskeläinen
Micronesia	Tokyo	Ambassador accredited from Japan	Tanja Jääskeläinen
Palau	Tokyo	Ambassador accredited from Japan	Tanja Jääskeläinen

=== Europe ===
Country	City (location)	Type of mission	Ambassador
Austria	Vienna	Embassy	Nina Vaskunlahti
Belgium	Brussels	Embassy	Jouko Leinonen
Luxembourg	Brussels	Ambassador accredited from Belgium	Jouko Leinonen
Bulgaria	Sofia	Embassy	Kirsti Pohjankukka
Croatia	Zagreb	Embassy	Sirpa Oksanen
Bosnia and Herzegovina	Zagreb	Ambassador accredited from Croatia	Sirpa Oksanen
Holy See	Zagreb	Ambassador accredited from Croatia	Sirpa Oksanen
Cyprus	Nicosia	Embassy	Päivi Peltokoski
Czechia	Prague	Embassy	Pasi Tuominen
Slovakia	Prague	Ambassador accredited from Czechia	Pasi Tuominen
Denmark	Copenhagen	Embassy	Jukka Siukosaari
Estonia	Tallinn	Embassy	Vesa Vasara
France	Paris	Embassy	Kirsikka Lehto-Asikainen
Monaco	Paris	Ambassador accredited from France	Kirsikka Lehto-Asikainen
Germany	Berlin	Embassy	Kai Sauer
Greece	Athens	Embassy	Leena Pylvänäinen
Albania	Athens	Ambassador accredited from Greece	Leena Pylvänäinen
Hungary	Budapest	Embassy	Pertti Anttinen
Slovenia	Budapest	Ambassador accredited from Hungary	Pertti Anttinen
Iceland	Reykjavík	Embassy	Ville Cantell
Ireland	Dublin	Embassy	Leena Gardemeister
Italy	Rome	Embassy	Matti Lassila
Malta	Rome	Ambassador accredited from Italy	Matti Lassila
San Marino	Rome	Ambassador accredited from Italy	Matti Lassila
Kosovo	Pristina	Embassy	Eevamari Laaksonen
Latvia	Riga	Embassy	Anne Saloranta
Lithuania	Vilnius	Embassy	Jaakko Lehtovirta
Belarus	Vilnius	Ambassador accredited from Lithuania	Jaakko Lehtovirta
Netherlands	The Hague	Embassy	Ilkka-Pekka Similä
Norway	Oslo	Embassy	Teemu Tanner
Portugal	Lisbon	Embassy	Christian Lindholm
Poland	Warsaw	Embassy	Päivi Laine
Romania	Bucharest	Embassy	Leena Liukkonen
Moldova	Bucharest	Ambassador accredited from Romania	Leena Liukkonen
Russia	Moscow	Embassy	Marja Liivala
Serbia	Belgrade	Embassy	Niklas Lindqvist
Montenegro	Belgrade	Ambassador accredited from Serbia	Niklas Lindqvist
North Macedonia	Belgrade	Ambassador accredited from Serbia	Niklas Lindqvist
Spain	Madrid	Embassy	Jari Luoto
Andorra	Madrid	Ambassador accredited from Spain	Jari Luoto
Sweden	Stockholm	Embassy	Olli Kantanen
Switzerland	Bern	Embassy	Okko-Pekka Salmimies
Liechtenstein	Bern	Ambassador accredited from Switzerland	Okko-Pekka Salmimies
Ukraine	Kyiv	Embassy	Tarja Fernández
United Kingdom	London	Embassy	Teemu Turunen

=== Americas ===
Country	Host City	Type of mission	Ambassador/Head of Mission
Antigua and Barbuda	Helsinki	Roving Ambassador for the Caribbean, accredited from Helsinki	Pertti Ikonen
Barbados	Helsinki	Roving Ambassador for the Caribbean, accredited from Helsinki	Pertti Ikonen
Bahamas	Helsinki	Roving Ambassador for the Caribbean, accredited from Helsinki	Pertti Ikonen
Belize	Helsinki	Roving Ambassador for the Caribbean, accredited from Helsinki	Pertti Ikonen
Dominica	Helsinki	Roving Ambassador for the Caribbean, accredited from Helsinki	Pertti Ikonen
Grenada	Helsinki	Roving Ambassador for the Caribbean, accredited from Helsinki	Pertti Ikonen
Guyana	Helsinki	Roving Ambassador for the Caribbean, accredited from Helsinki	Pertti Ikonen
Haiti	Helsinki	Roving Ambassador for the Caribbean, accredited from Helsinki	Pertti Ikonen
Jamaica	Helsinki	Roving Ambassador for the Caribbean, accredited from Helsinki	Pertti Ikonen
Saint Kitts and Nevis	Helsinki	Roving Ambassador for the Caribbean, accredited from Helsinki	Pertti Ikonen
Saint Lucia	Helsinki	Roving Ambassador for the Caribbean, accredited from Helsinki	Pertti Ikonen
Saint Vincent and the Grenadines	Helsinki	Roving Ambassador for the Caribbean, accredited from Helsinki	Pertti Ikonen
Suriname	Helsinki	Roving Ambassador for the Caribbean, accredited from Helsinki	Pertti Ikonen
Trinidad and Tobago	Helsinki	Roving Ambassador for the Caribbean, accredited from Helsinki	Pertti Ikonen
Argentina	Buenos Aires	Embassy	Veikko Kiljunen
Paraguay	Buenos Aires	Ambassador accredited from Argentina	Veikko Kiljunen
Uruguay	Buenos Aires	Ambassador accredited from Argentina	Veikko Kiljunen
Brazil	Brasília	Embassy	Antti Kaski
Canada	Ottawa	Embassy	Hanna-Leena Korteniemi
Chile	Santiago de Chile	Embassy	Johanna Kotkajärvi
Colombia	Bogotá	Embassy	Eija Rotinen
Dominican Republic	Bogotá	Ambassador accredited from Colombia	
Panama	Bogotá	Ambassador accredited from Colombia	
Venezuela	Bogotá	Ambassador accredited from Colombia	
Mexico	Mexico City	Embassy	Ari Mäki
Costa Rica	Mexico City	Ambassador accredited from Mexico	Ari Mäki
Cuba	Mexico City	Ambassador accredited from Mexico	Ari Mäki
El Salvador	Mexico City	Ambassador accredited from Mexico	Ari Mäki
Guatemala	Mexico City	Ambassador accredited from Mexico	Ari Mäki
Honduras	Mexico City	Ambassador accredited from Mexico	Ari Mäki
Nicaragua	Mexico City	Ambassador accredited from Mexico	Ari Mäki
Peru	Lima	Embassy	Lasse Keisalo
Bolivia	Lima	Ambassador accredited from Peru	Lasse Keisalo
Ecuador	Lima	Ambassador accredited from Peru	Lasse Keisalo
United States	Washington, D.C.	Embassy	Leena-Kaisa Mikkola

== Current ambassadors to international organisations ==
International Organisation	City (location)	Country (location)	Ambassador
North Atlantic Treaty Organization (NATO)	Brussels	Belgium	Piritta Asunmaa
Council of Europe (COE)	Strasbourg	France	Pekka Hyvönen
European Union (EU)	Brussels	Belgium	Pilvi-Sisko Vierros-Villeneuve
Caribbean Community (CARICOM)	Georgetown	Guyana	Mikko Pyhälä
Organization for Security and Co-operation in Europe (OSCE)	Vienna	Austria	Katja Pehrman
Organisation for Economic Co-operation and Development (OECD)	Paris	France	Pasi-Heikki Vaaranmaa
United Nations Organization (UN)	New York City	United States	Kai Sauer
United Nations Organization	Geneva	Switzerland	Heidi Schroderus-Fox
United Nations Organization	Vienna	Austria	Anu Laamanen
Association of Southeast Asian Nations (ASEAN)	Jakarta	Indonesia	Kai Sauer
United Nations Educational, Scientific and Cultural Organization (UNESCO)	Paris	France	Antti Kuosmanen
International Atomic Energy Agency (IAEA)	Vienna	Austria	Anu Laamanen
Organisation for the Prohibition of Chemical Weapons (OPCW)	The Hague	Netherlands	Liisa Talonpoika
Arab League	Cairo	Egypt	Tuula Yrjölä
African Union (AU)	Addis Abeba	Ethiopia	Sirpa Mäenpää
Economic Community of West African States (ECOWAS)	Abuja	Nigeria	Riitta Korpivaara
Southern African Development Community (SADC)	Gaborone	Botswana	Petri Salo
East African Community (EAC)	Arusha	Tanzania	Petri Salo

== See also ==
- List of ambassadors of Finland (current and former)
