= Foreign relations of Croatia =

The foreign relations of Croatia are primarily formulated and executed by the Croatian government which guides the state's interactions with other nations, their citizens, and foreign organizations. Active in global affairs since the 9th century, modern Croatian diplomacy is considered to have formed following the independence of Croatia in 1991. As a modern state, Croatia established diplomatic relations with most world nations – 189 states in total – during the 1990s, starting with Germany (1991) and most recently with Liberia (2024). Croatia has friendly relations with most of its neighboring countries, namely Italy, Slovenia, Hungary, and Montenegro. They maintain colder, more tense relations with Serbia as well as Bosnia and Herzegovina due to historic nation-building conflict and differing political ideologies. It maintains a special relationship with both Albania and Kosovo.

Croatia is seen as a small power offering stability in Southeast Europe due to its political alignment with the Western world. It maintains strong relations with the United States, the United Kingdom, and the European Union (EU), joining the organization in 2013. Croatia is a close military ally to the U.S. and Europe through its membership in NATO, having joined in 2009. The economy of Croatia is one of the largest in Southeast Europe with Croatia maintaining a relatively large military presence in the region. Its strong Euro-Atlantic alignment has been used to advance Western cultural, political, and economic synergy across Southeast Europe. Croatia is a member of the United Nations (UN), the Council of Europe, the World Trade Organization (WTO), Union for the Mediterranean, among other international organizations.

== History ==
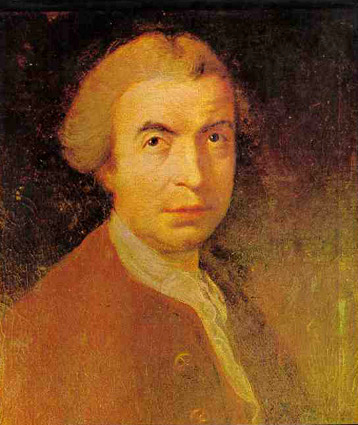
Croatian-Italian diplomat Roger Joseph Boscovich, 1760

The first native Croatian ruler recognised by the Pope was duke Branimir, who received papal recognition from Pope John VIII on 7 June 879. Tomislav was the first king of Croatia, noted as such in a letter of Pope John X in 925. Maritime Republic of Ragusa (1358–1808) maintained widespread diplomatic relations with the Ottoman Empire, Republic of Venice, Papal States and other states. Diplomatic relations of the Republic of Ragusa are often perceived as a historical inspiration for the contemporary Croatian diplomacy. During the Wars of the Holy League Ragusa avoided alignment with either side in the conflict rejecting Venetian calls to join the Holy League.

Antun Mihanović, author of the anthem of Croatia, spent over 20 years as a consul of the Austrian Empire in Belgrade (Principality of Serbia), Bucharest (Wallachia) and Istanbul (Ottoman Empire) starting in 1836. The Yugoslav Committee, political interest group formed by South Slavs from Austria-Hungary during World War I, petitioned Allies of World War I and participated in international events such as the Congress of Oppressed Nationalities of the Austro-Hungarian Empire. The Association for the Promotion of the League of Nations Values was active in Zagreb in the interwar period organizing lectures by Albert Thomas, Goldsworthy Lowes Dickinson and Ludwig Quidde. During World War II, the Axis puppet state known as the Independent State of Croatia maintained diplomatic relations with several different countries in Europe.

=== Socialist Republic of Croatia within Yugoslavia ===
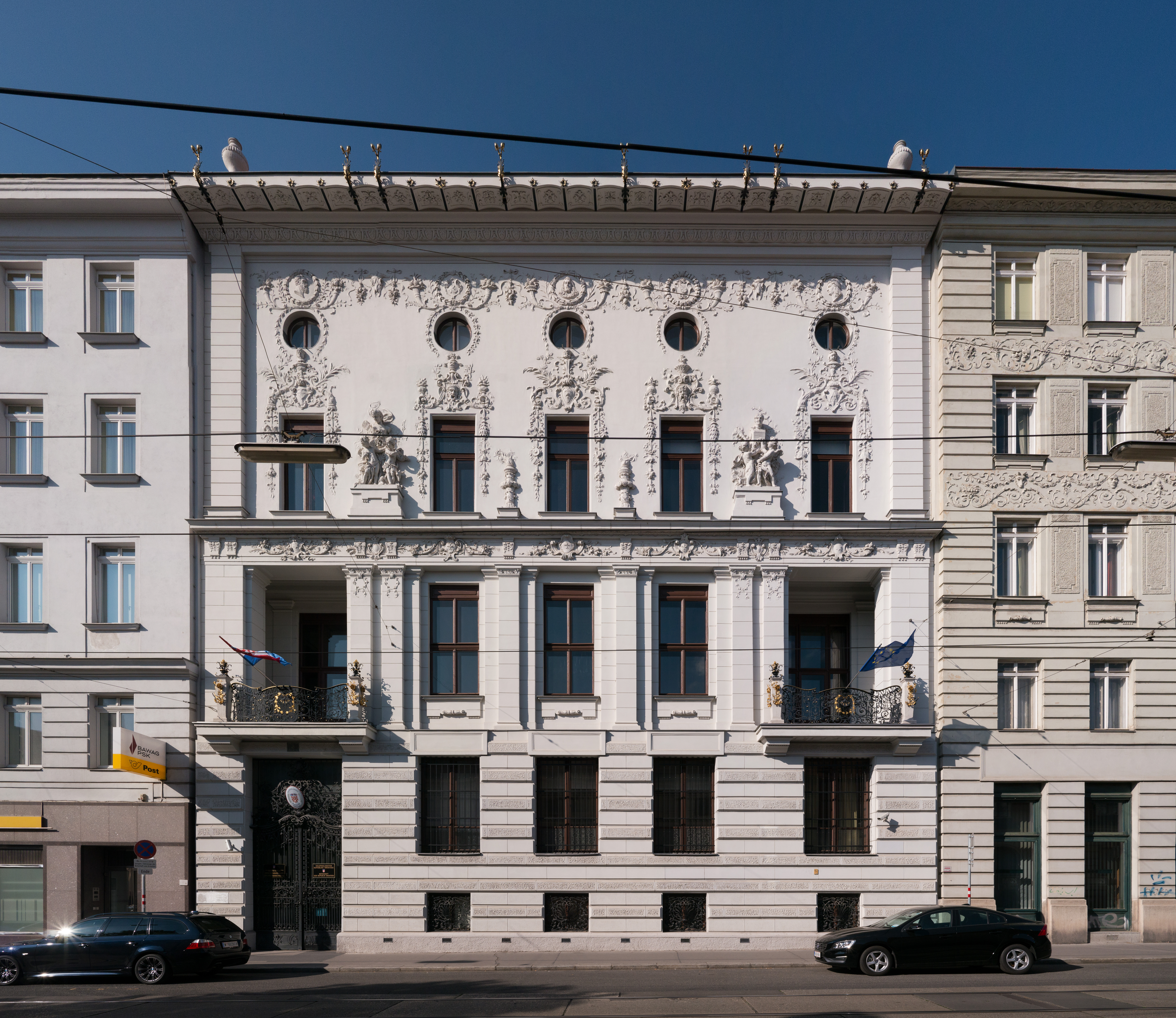
Embassy of Croatia in Austria, 2015

While each constitution of Yugoslavia defined foreign affairs as a federal level issue, over the years Yugoslav constituent republics played increasingly prominent role in either defining this policy or pursuing their own initiatives. Number of diplomats from Croatia gained significant experience in the service to the prominent Cold War era Yugoslav diplomacy.

In June 1943 Vladimir Velebit became the point of contact for foreign military missions in their dealings with the Yugoslav Partisans. Ivan Šubašić (1944–1945), Josip Smodlaka (NKOJ: 1943–1945), Josip Vrhovec (1978–1982) and Budimir Lončar (1987–1991) led the federal level Ministry of Foreign Affairs while numerous Croatian diplomats served in Yugoslav embassies or multilateral organizations. In 1956 Brijuni archipelago in People's Republic of Croatia hosted the Brioni Meeting, one of the major early initiatives leading to the establishment of the Non-Aligned Movement. Between 1960 and 1967 Vladimir Velebit was executive secretary of the United Nations Economic Commission for Europe. During the Croatian Spring Croatian economist Hrvoje Šošić argued for the separate admission of the Socialist Republic of Croatia into the United Nations similar to the membership of Ukrainian and Byelorussian Soviet Socialist Republic which led to his imprisonment. In 1978, Croatia together with SR Slovenia joined the newly established Alps-Adriatic Working Group. The breakup of Yugoslavia led to mass transfers of experts from federal institutions enabling post-Yugoslav states to establish their own diplomatic bodies primarily by employing former Yugoslav cadres. The 2001 Agreement on Succession Issues of the Former Socialist Federal Republic of Yugoslavia formally assigned to Croatia a portion of the diplomatic and consular properties of the previous federation.

=== Foreign policy since independence ===
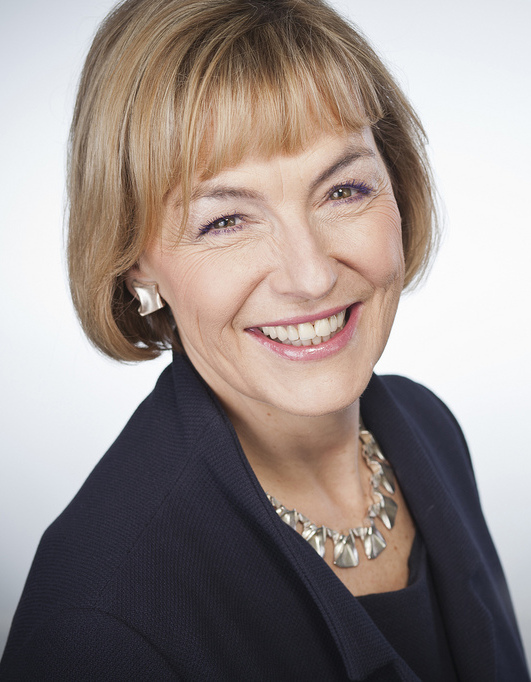
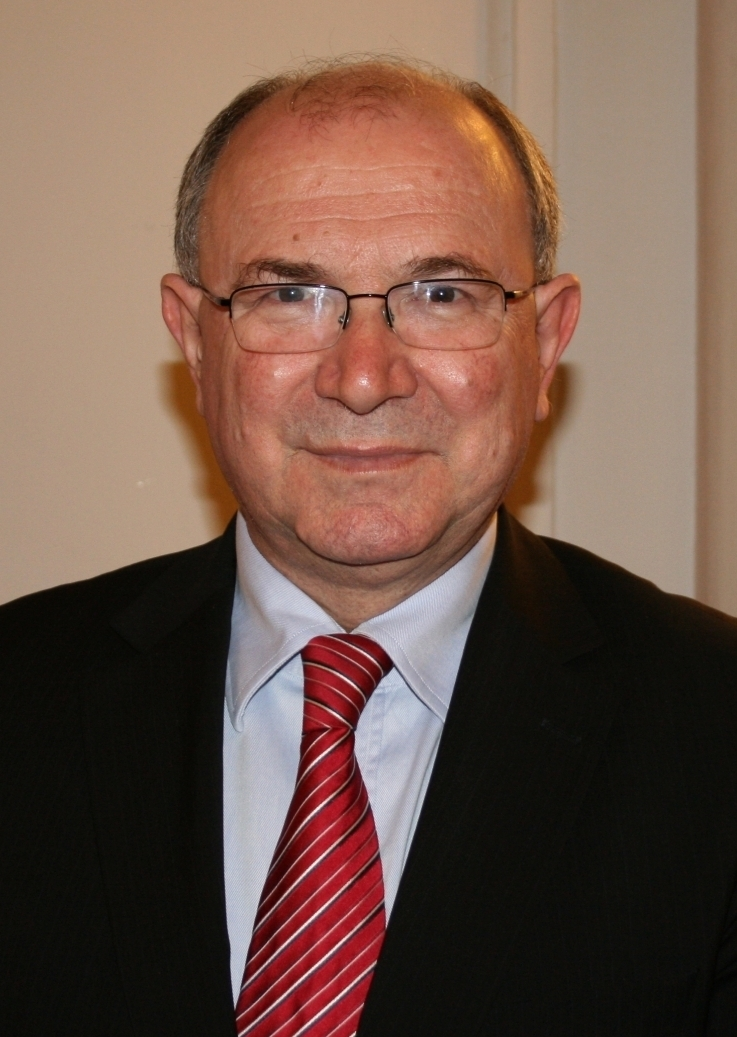
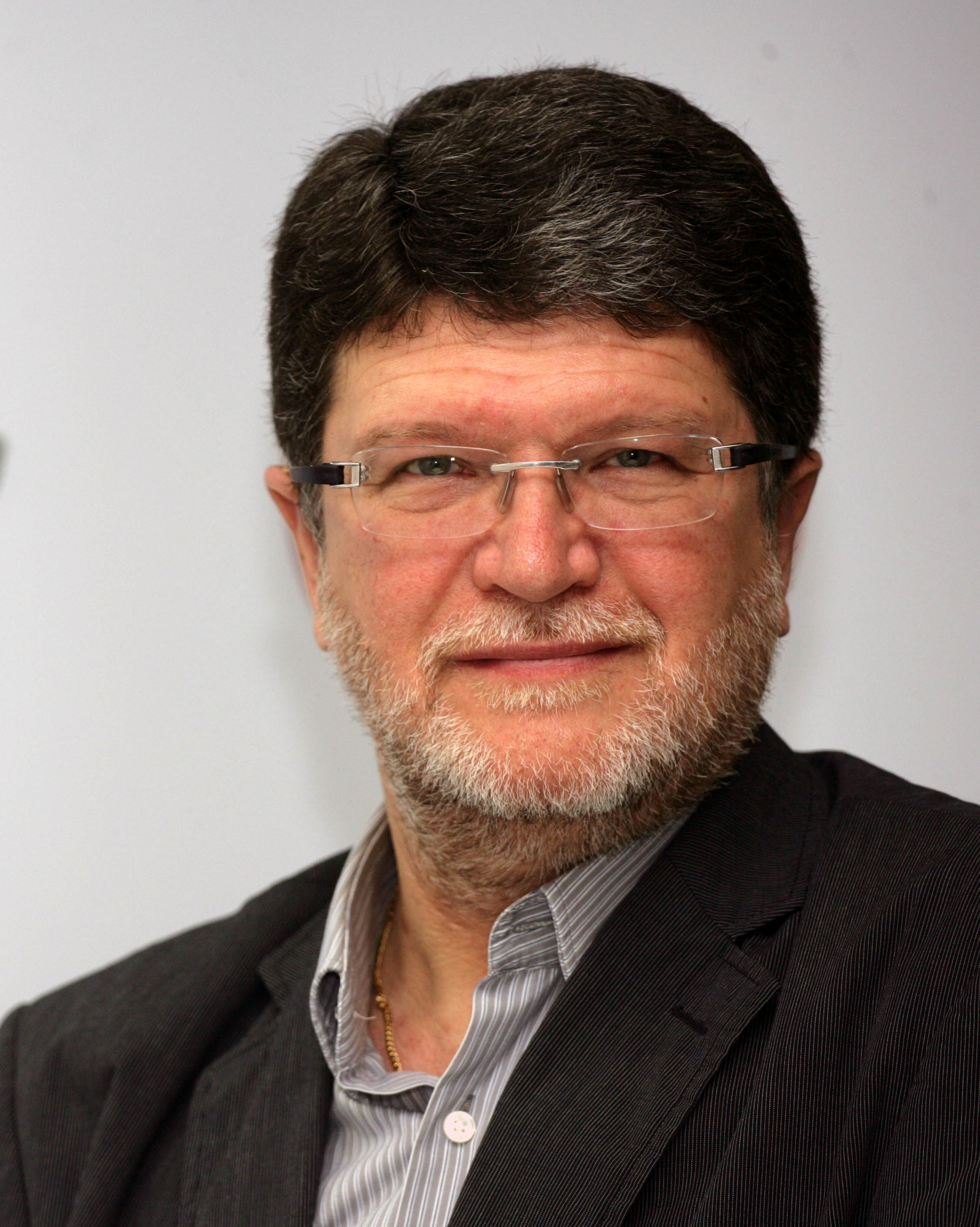
Ministers of Foreign Affairs: Vesna Pusić (2011-2016), Mate Granić (1993-2000) and Tonino Picula (2000-2003)

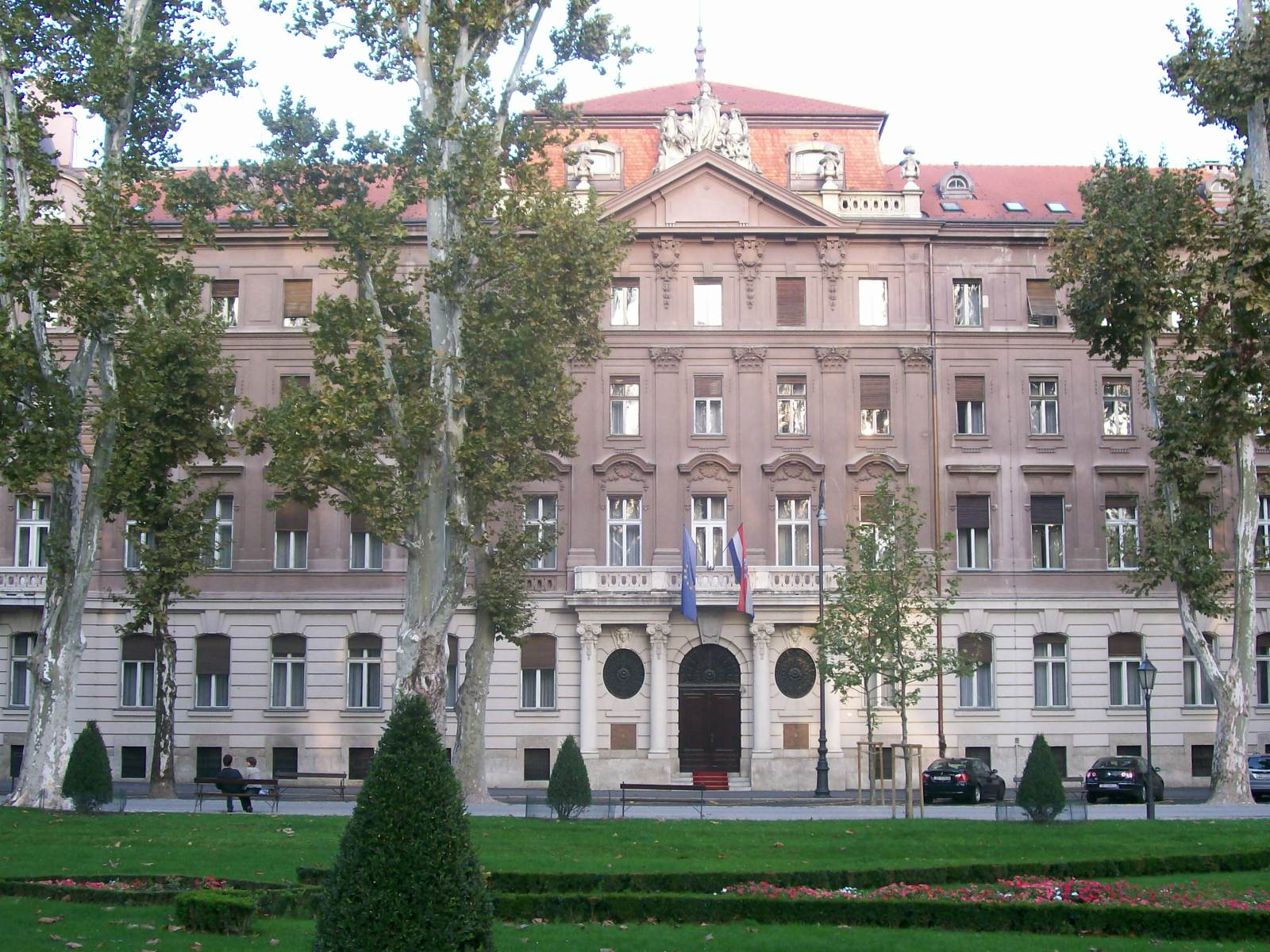
Ministry of Foreign Affairs building at the Nikola Šubić Zrinski Square, 2007

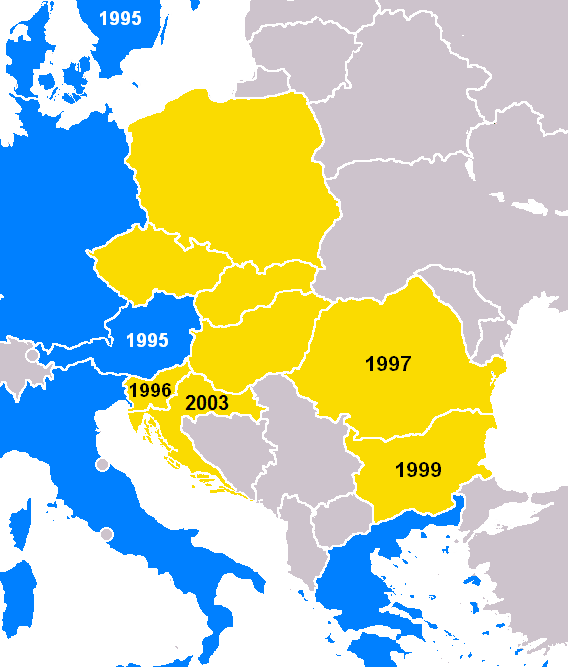
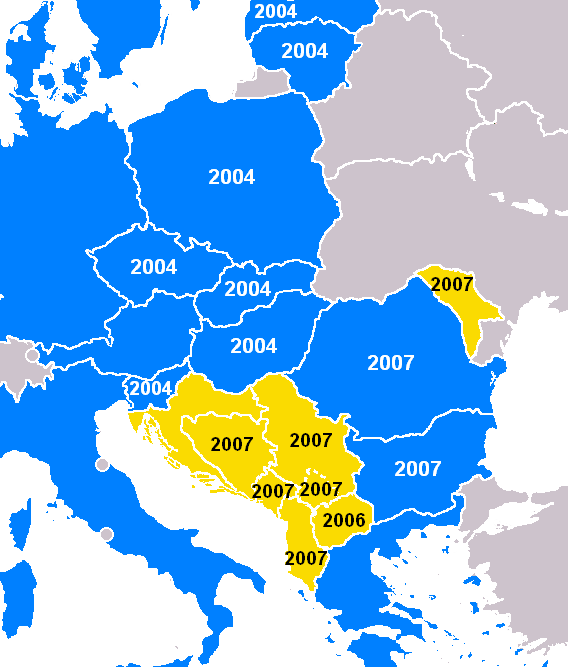
Croatia was a member state of CEFTA between 2003 and 2013. Maps of CEFTA in 2003 and 2007.

On 17 December 1991 the European Economic Community adopted the "Common Position for the recognition of the Yugoslav Republics" requesting the Yugoslav republics wishing to gain recognition to accept provisions of international law protecting human rights as well as national minorities rights in hope that credible guarantees may prevent incentives for violent confrontations. Later that month Croatian Parliament introduced the Constitutional Act on the Rights of National Minorities in the Republic of Croatia opening the way for 15 January 1992 collective recognition by the Community. Croatia maintained some links beyond the Euro-Atlantic world via its observer status in the Non-Aligned Movement which it enjoyed already at the 10th Summit of the Non-Aligned Movement in Jakarta, Indonesia.

Following the international recognition of Croatia in 1992 the country was faced with the Croatian War of Independence between 1991 and 1995. A significant part of the country was outside of the control of the central government with the declaration of self-proclaimed unrecognized Republic of Serbian Krajina. In 1992 signing of the Sarajevo Agreement led to the cease-fire to allow UNPROFOR deployment in the country. Diplomatic efforts led to unsuccessful proposals which included the Daruvar Agreement and Z-4 Plan. In 1995 UNCRO mission took over the UNPROFOR mandate yet soon after Operation Storm led to a decisive victory for the Croatian Army with only the Eastern Slavonia, Baranja and Western Syrmia remaining initially as a rump territory of Krajina. A diplomatic solution that avoided conflict in Eastern Slavonia was reached on 12 November 1995 via the signing of the Erdut Agreement with significant support and facilitation from the international community (primarily the United States, and with United Nations and various European actors). Temporary UNTAES administration over the region opened the way for the signing of the Dayton Agreement which ended the Bosnian War. It also led to the signing of 1996 Agreement on Normalization of Relations between the Federal Republic of Yugoslavia and the Republic of Croatia.

With the resolution of some of the major bilateral issues arising from the Yugoslav Wars Croatian foreign policy has focused on greater Euro-Atlantic integration, mainly entering the European Union and NATO. The progress was nevertheless slow in the period between 1996 and 1999 with rising concerns over authoritarian tendencies in the country. In order to gain access to European and trans-Atlantic institutions, it has had to undo many negative effects of the breakup of Yugoslavia and the war that ensued, and improve and maintain good relations with its neighbours. Croatia has had an uneven record in these areas between 1996 and 1999 during the right-wing HDZ government, inhibiting its relations with the European Union and the United States. In 1997 United States diplomacy even called upon its European partners to suspend Croatia from the Council of Europe as long as country fails to show adequate respect for human and minority rights.

With the 1999 death of President Franjo Tuđman, 2000 Croatian parliamentary election as well as corresponding regional changes such as the Overthrow of Slobodan Milošević, the European Union organized the 2000 Zagreb and 2003 Thessaloniki Summits in which European integration perspective was discussed for all the countries in the region. The new SDP-led centre-left coalition government slowly relinquished control over public media companies and did not interfere with freedom of speech and independent media, though it did not complete the process of making Croatian Radiotelevision independent. Judiciary reforms remained a pending issue as well. The government's foreign relations were severely affected by the hesitance and stalling of the extradition of Croatian general Janko Bobetko to the International Criminal Tribunal for the Former Yugoslavia (ICTY), and inability to take general Ante Gotovina into custody for questioning by the Court. Nevertheless, Croatia managed to enter NATO's Partnership for Peace Programme in May 2000, World Trade Organization in July 2000, signing a Stabilization and Association Agreement with the EU in October 2001, Membership Action Plan in May 2002, and joined the Central European Free Trade Agreement (CEFTA) in December 2002. The EU membership application was the last major international undertaking of the Račan government, which submitted a 7,000-page report in reply to the questionnaire by the European Commission. Negotiations were initiated with the achievement of the full cooperation with the Hague Tribunal in October 2005. Croatian president Stjepan Mesić participated in the NAM conferences in Havana in 2006 and Sharm el-Sheikh in 2009 using the country's post-Yugoslav link with the Third World in its successful campaign for the Eastern European Spot at the United Nations Security Council in 2008–2009 (in open competition with Czech Republic which was a member state both of EU and NATO).

Refugee returns accelerated since 1999, reached a peak in 2000, but then slightly decreased in 2001 and 2002. The OSCE Mission to Croatia, focusing on the governed by the UNTAES, continued to monitor human rights and the return of refugees until December 2007 with the OSCE office in Zagreb finally closing in 2012.

=== Accession to the European Union ===
EU members in 2013 Croatia

At the time of Croatia's application to the European Union, three EU members states were yet to ratify the Stabilization and Association Agreement: United Kingdom, the Netherlands and Italy. The new Sanader government elected in 2003 elections repeated the assurances that Croatia will fulfill the missing political obligations, and expedited the extradition of several ICTY inductees. The European Commission replied to the answers of the questionnaire sent to Croatia on 20 April 2004 with a positive opinion. The country was finally accepted as EU candidate in July 2004. Italy and United Kingdom ratified the Stabilization and Association Agreement shortly thereafter, while the ten EU member states that were admitted to membership that year ratified it all together at a 2004 European Summit. In December 2004, the EU leaders announced that accession negotiations with Croatia would start on 17 March 2005 provided that Croatian government cooperates fully with the ICTY.

Croatia finished accession negotiations on 30 June 2011, and on 9 December 2011, signed the Treaty of Accession. A referendum on EU accession was held in Croatia on 22 January 2012, with 66% of participants voting in favour of joining the Union. The ratification process was concluded on 21 June 2013, and entry into force and accession of Croatia to the EU took place on 1 July 2013. The Council of Europe was led by Croatian diplomat Marija Pejčinović Burić from 2019 to 2024.

== Foreign affairs ==
The main objective of modern Croatian foreign policy is leadership positioning within European international institutions and throughout Southeast Europe as a developed small power. It seeks deeper connectivity with NATO partners and strengthening multilateral and bilateral cooperation. Government officials in charge of foreign policy include the Minister of Foreign and European Affairs, the President of the Republic and the Prime Minister.

Croatia has established diplomatic relations with 189 countries around the world. As of 2009, Croatia maintains a network of 51 embassies, 24 consulates and eight permanent diplomatic missions abroad. Furthermore, there are 52 foreign embassies and 69 consulates in the Republic of Croatia in addition to offices of international organizations such as the European Bank for Reconstruction and Development, International Organization for Migration, Organization for Security and Co-operation in Europe (OSCE), World Bank, World Health Organization, United Nations Development Programme, United Nations High Commissioner for Refugees and UNICEF.

== International organizations ==
Republic of Croatia participates in the following international organizations: AIIB, Australia Group, BIS, BSEC (observer), CE, CEI, CERN (Associate Member), EAPC, EBRD, ECB / EMU, ECE, EEA, EU, ESA (Cooperating State), ESM, FAO, G11, IADB, IAEA, IBRD, ICAO, ICC, ICRM, ICSID, IDA, IFAD, IFC, IFRCS, IHO, ILO, IMF, IMO, Inmarsat, Intelsat, Interpol, IOC, IOM, IPU, ISO, ITU, ITUC, ITSO, MIGA, NAM (observer), NATO, NSG, OAS (observer), OECD (formal accession negotiations launched in 2022), OIF (observer), OPCW, OSCE, PCA, Schengen Area, SECI, UfM, UN, UNCTAD, UNESCO, UNIDO, UPU, Wassenaar Arrangement, WCO, WFTU, WHO, WIPO, WMO, WToO, WTO, WVF, Zangger Committee.

There exists a Permanent Representative of Croatia to the United Nations.

== International disputes ==
=== Bosnia and Herzegovina ===
Modern relations between the two states are generally functional, marked by regular cooperation, while some political issues remain unresolved. Disputes remain over their shared border, extradition treaties, as well as sovereign ownership of infrastructure and nuclear assets.

=== Montenegro ===
Croatia and Montenegro have a largely latent border dispute over the Prevlaka peninsula.

=== Serbia ===
Croatia and Serbia have a complicated relationship marked by a variety of bilateral issues. The relations, established following the dissolution of Yugoslavia and the Croatian War of Independence, are functional but cool, stemming from historic conflicts and divergent political ideologies. The border between Croatia and Serbia in the area of the Danube is the subject of territorial dispute.

=== Slovenia ===
Croatia and Slovenia have several land and maritime boundary disputes, mainly in the Gulf of Piran, regarding Slovenian access to international waters, a small number of pockets of land on the right-hand side of the river Dragonja, and around the Sveta Gera peak. The two states contested the sovereign ownership of bank Ljubljanska banka, which ended in Slovenia's favor.

== Diplomatic relations ==
The first country to officially recognize Croatia was neighboring and partially-recognized Slovenia, on 26 June 1991, the day after both nations declared independence from Yugoslavia. The nations of Iceland, Germany, and the Holy See were the joint first states with international recognition to formally recognize Croatia, doing so on 15 October 1991 with effective dates implemented in the ensuing days. Iceland completed recognition of Croatian independence on 19 December 1991. On the same day, Germany announced its intention to recognise Croatia which was to come into effect on 15 January 1992. Italy, Sweden and the Holy See announced their intention of recognition. Holy See recognised Croatia on 13 January, and San Marino on 14 January 1992.

On 15 January 1992, Croatia was recognised by all 12 members of the European Economic Community (the predecessor of the European Union) as well as by Austria, Canada, Bulgaria, Hungary, Poland, Malta, Norway and Switzerland. By the end of January 1992, Croatia was recognised by 44 countries. Therefore, 15 January is celebrated in Croatia as the Day of International Recognition. Russia recognised Croatia in February, Japan in March, the United States in April, and India in May 1992.

At the session of the United Nations General Assembly held on 22 May 1992, which was chaired by Saudi ambassador Sinan Shihabi, Croatia was, alongside Slovenia and Bosnia and Herzegovina, admitted to the membership of the United Nations. Croatia's UN delegation was led by the Croatian President Franjo Tuđman. After a solemn session, United Nations Secretary-General Boutros Boutros Ghali sent delegations from the new UN members states to the main entrance of the UN headquarters, where Croatian, Slovenian and Bosnian-Herzegovinian flags were erected on the masts. Many diplomats and thousands of Croatian emigrants attended flag hoisting ceremony.

By 31 December 1995, Croatia was recognised by 124 countries. On 9 September 1995, Croatia and FR Yugoslavia concluded a Mutual Reconciliation Agreement which included mutual recognition, and established diplomatic relations on 23 August 1996. Among them are all G20 member states that recognized Croatia. On 15 June 2026, Croatia was recognized by Bhutan, while two countries, Niger and Tonga, remained the only states yet to do so.

List of countries which Croatia maintains diplomatic relations with:

#	Country	Date
1	Germany	15 January 1992
2	Austria	15 January 1992
3	Italy	17 January 1992
4	Hungary	18 January 1992
5	Sweden	29 January 1992
6	Switzerland	30 January 1992
7	Denmark	1 February 1992
8	Portugal	3 February 1992
9	Liechtenstein	4 February 1992
10	Slovenia	6 February 1992
—	Holy See	8 February 1992
11	Netherlands	11 February 1992
12	Australia	13 February 1992
13	Latvia	14 February 1992
14	Ukraine	18 February 1992
15	Finland	19 February 1992
16	Norway	20 February 1992
17	New Zealand	25 February 1992
18	Estonia	2 March 1992
19	Spain	9 March 1992
20	Belgium	10 March 1992
21	Paraguay	13 March 1992
22	Lithuania	18 March 1992
23	North Macedonia	30 March 1992
24	Poland	11 April 1992
25	Argentina	13 April 1992
26	Chile	15 April 1992
27	Iran	18 April 1992
28	France	24 April 1992
29	Luxembourg	29 April 1992
30	Malaysia	4 May 1992
31	Czech Republic	11 May 1992
32	China	13 May 1992
33	Russia	25 May 1992
34	United Arab Emirates	23 June 1992
35	United Kingdom	24 June 1992
36	Morocco	26 June 1992
37	Iceland	30 June 1992
38	Malta	30 June 1992
39	India	9 July 1992
40	Sudan	17 July 1992
41	Greece	20 July 1992
42	Moldova	20 July 1992
43	Bosnia and Herzegovina	21 July 1992
44	United States	11 August 1992
45	Bulgaria	13 August 1992
46	Albania	25 August 1992
47	Turkey	26 August 1992
48	Romania	29 August 1992
49	Indonesia	3 September 1992
50	Thailand	9 September 1992
51	Cuba	23 September 1992
52	Belarus	25 September 1992
53	Egypt	1 October 1992
54	Algeria	15 October 1992
55	Kazakhstan	20 October 1992
56	South Korea	18 November 1992
57	South Africa	19 November 1992
58	Singapore	23 November 1992
59	Bolivia	26 November 1992
60	North Korea	30 November 1992
61	Qatar	5 December 1992
62	Mexico	6 December 1992
63	Guatemala	22 December 1992
–	Sovereign Military Order of Malta	22 December 1992
64	Brazil	23 December 1992
65	Slovakia	1 January 1993
66	Nigeria	7 January 1993
67	Peru	12 January 1993
68	Yemen	17 January 1993
69	Bahrain	18 January 1993
70	Tunisia	30 January 1993
71	Georgia	1 February 1993
72	Cyprus	4 February 1993
73	Venezuela	8 February 1993
74	San Marino	11 February 1993
75	Ghana	17 February 1993
76	Philippines	25 February 1993
77	Japan	5 March 1993
78	Mongolia	10 March 1993
79	Canada	14 April 1993
80	Uruguay	4 May 1993
81	São Tomé and Príncipe	23 May 1993
82	Tanzania	2 July 1993
83	Samoa	8 March 1994
84	Jordan	29 June 1994
85	Vietnam	1 July 1994
86	Armenia	8 July 1994
87	Pakistan	20 July 1994
88	Cape Verde	19 August 1994
89	Saint Vincent and the Grenadines	7 October 1994
90	Kuwait	8 October 1994
91	Angola	16 November 1994
92	Lebanon	5 December 1994
93	Azerbaijan	26 January 1995
94	Ireland	27 January 1995
95	Uzbekistan	6 February 1995
96	Colombia	25 April 1995
97	Andorra	28 April 1995
98	Burkina Faso	18 May 1995
99	Saudi Arabia	8 June 1995
100	Zambia	20 September 1995
101	Ethiopia	17 October 1995
102	Ivory Coast	17 October 1995
103	Costa Rica	19 October 1995
104	Guinea-Bissau	19 October 1995
105	Afghanistan	3 January 1996
106	Belize	23 January 1996
107	Ecuador	22 February 1996
108	Laos	4 March 1996
109	Nicaragua	29 March 1996
110	Panama	12 June 1996
111	Turkmenistan	2 July 1996
112	Mozambique	23 August 1996
113	Serbia	9 September 1996
114	Cambodia	10 September 1996
115	Jamaica	9 October 1996
116	Kyrgyzstan	23 December 1996
117	Sri Lanka	14 February 1997
118	Maldives	8 April 1997
119	El Salvador	24 June 1997
120	Oman	30 June 1997
121	Barbados	11 July 1997
122	Fiji	14 July 1997
123	Syria	29 August 1997
124	Mauritius	3 September 1997
125	Israel	4 September 1997
126	Seychelles	30 September 1997
127	Senegal	1 October 1997
128	Papua New Guinea	5 December 1997
129	Guinea	8 December 1997
130	Saint Lucia	10 December 1997
131	Suriname	17 December 1997
132	Bangladesh	18 December 1997
133	Nepal	6 February 1998
134	Brunei	1 May 1998
135	Namibia	22 June 1998
136	Gambia	16 October 1998
137	Lesotho	6 November 1998
138	Malawi	13 November 1998
139	Zimbabwe	12 February 1999
140	Uganda	10 March 1999
141	Tajikistan	1 April 1999
142	Eritrea	4 June 1999
143	Antigua and Barbuda	15 June 1999
144	Comoros	29 June 1999
145	Myanmar	3 September 1999
146	Chad	17 September 1999
147	Honduras	20 September 1999
148	Federated States of Micronesia	29 September 1999
149	Haiti	15 October 1999
150	Libya	30 March 2000
151	Vanuatu	18 April 2000
152	Grenada	19 May 2000
153	Nauru	4 December 2000
154	Dominican Republic	5 February 2001
155	Benin	26 March 2001
156	Mali	13 September 2001
157	Gabon	22 October 2001
158	Cameroon	18 October 2002
159	Timor-Leste	5 February 2003
160	Sierra Leone	23 July 2003
161	Mauritania	24 November 2004
162	Kenya	1 December 2004
163	Iraq	4 January 2005
164	Botswana	9 September 2005
165	Montenegro	7 July 2006
166	Guyana	25 September 2006
167	Madagascar	27 September 2006
168	Republic of the Congo	10 May 2007
169	Equatorial Guinea	18 October 2007
170	Democratic Republic of the Congo	19 October 2007
171	Monaco	14 December 2007
–	Kosovo	30 June 2008
172	Trinidad and Tobago	14 December 2011
173	Solomon Islands	18 April 2012
174	Dominica	30 April 2013
175	Palau	26 September 2015
176	Saint Kitts and Nevis	27 May 2016
177	Kiribati	26 August 2016
178	Bahamas	31 January 2017
179	Djibouti	22 May 2017
180	Rwanda	15 February 2018
181	Eswatini	5 April 2019
182	Marshall Islands	24 September 2019
183	Tuvalu	2 November 2020
184	Burundi	14 May 2021
185	South Sudan	16 November 2021
186	Somalia	4 February 2022
187	Central African Republic	18 September 2023
188	Togo	18 September 2023
189	Liberia	26 September 2024

== Bilateral relations ==
=== Multilateral ===
Organization	Formal Relations Began	Notes
European Union		See 2013 enlargement of the European Union Croatia joined the European Union as a full member on 1 July 2013.
NATO		See Croatia–NATO relations Croatia joined NATO as a full member on 1 April 2009.

=== Africa ===
Country	Formal relations began	Notes
Algeria	15 October 1992	Croatia has an embassy in Algiers.; Algeria has an embassy in Zagreb.
Angola	16 November 1994	Croatia is represented in Angola through its embassy in Lisbon (Portugal).; Angola is represented in Croatia through its embassy in Vienna (Austria).
Benin	26 March 2001	Croatia is represented in Benin through its embassy in Paris (France).; Benin is represented in Croatia through its embassy in Geneva (Switzerland).
Burkina Faso	18 May 1995	Croatia is represented in Burkina Faso through its embassy in Paris (France).; Burkina Faso is represented in Croatia through its embassy in Vienna (Austria) and consulate in Zagreb.
Egypt	1 October 1992	See Croatia–Egypt relations: Croatia has an embassy in Cairo and an honorary consulate in Alexandria.; Egypt has an embassy in Zagreb.
Kenya	22 May 1992	Croatia is represented in Kenya through its embassy in Pretoria (South Africa).; Kenya has a consulate in Zagreb, accredited to its embassy in Rome (Italy).
Lesotho	6 November 1998	Croatia is represented in Lesotho through its embassy in Pretoria (South Africa).; Lesotho is represented in Croatia through its embassy in Rome (Italy).
Libya	30 March 2000	See Croatia–Libya relations: Croatia has evacuated its embassy in Tripoli due to the worsening of security situation in the country.; Libya has an embassy in Zagreb.
South Africa	19 November 1992	Croatia has an embassy in Pretoria.; South Africa is represented in Croatia through its embassy in Budapest (Hungary), and consulate in Zagreb.; There are around 1500 to 2000 Croats who live in South Africa.; As of 2006, the two countries have a trade agreement.
Tanzania	2 July 1993	Croatia is represented in Tanzania through its embassy in Pretoria, (South Africa).; Tanzania is represented in Croatia through its embassy in Rome, (Italy).

=== Americas ===
Country	Formal relations began	Notes
Antigua and Barbuda	20 September 1999	Croatia is represented in Antigua and Barbuda through its Permanent Mission to the United Nations in New York (USA).; Antigua and Barbuda is represented in Croatia through its embassy in Vienna (Austria).
Argentina	13 April 1992	See Argentina–Croatia relations: Croatia has an embassy in Buenos Aires.; Argentina is represented in Croatia through its embassy in Budapest (Hungary).; More than 400,000 Argentinians are of Croatian descent.
Brazil	23 December 1992	Brazil has an embassy in Zagreb.; Croatia has an embassy in Brasília and consulate in São Paulo.
Canada	14 April 1993	See Canada–Croatia relations: Croatia has an embassy in Ottawa, a consulate general in Mississauga, and an honorary consulate in Saint John.; Canada has an embassy in Zagreb.; Both countries are members on NATO.
Chile	15 April 1992	See Chile–Croatia relations: Chile has an embassy in Zagreb and 3 consulates in Zagreb, Rijeka and Split.; Croatia has an embassy in Santiago and 2 consulates in Antofagasta and Punta Arenas.; It is officially accepted that there are up to 380,000 Chileans of Croatian descent
Colombia	25 April 1995	Colombia is represented in Croatia through its embassy in Vienna (Austria).; Croatia is represented in Colombia through its embassy in Brasília (Brazil).; Croatia is defined as an ally by Colombia on the war on drugs and as an example to follow after a post-conflict situation
Ecuador	22 February 1996	Croatia is represented in Ecuador through its embassy in Santiago (Chile).; Ecuador is represented in Croatia through its embassy in Budapest (Hungary).; An honorary consulate for Croatia was established in Guayaquil in 2022.
Guyana	25 February 2003	Both countries established diplomatic relations on 25 February 2003.; Croatia is represented in Guyana through its Permanent Mission in New York (USA).
Jamaica	9 October 1996	Croatia is represented in Jamaica through its Permanent Mission to the United Nations in New York (USA).
Mexico	6 December 1992	See Croatia–Mexico relations: Croatia is represented in Mexico through its embassy in Washington, D.C. (USA), and consulate in Mexico City.; Mexico is represented in Croatia through its embassy in Budapest (Hungary) and consulates in Zagreb and Split.
Panama	12 June 1996	Croatia is represented in Panama through its embassy in Washington, D.C. (USA).; Panama is represented in Croatia through its embassy in Piraeus (Greece).
Suriname	17 December 1997	Croatia is represented in Suriname through its Permanent Mission to the United Nations in New York (USA) and embassy in Brasília (Brazil).
United States of America	11 August 1992	See Croatia–United States relations: Croatia has an embassy in Washington, D.C., and three consulates-general in New York, Los Angeles, and Chicago; as well as six honorary consulates in Seattle, Kansas City, Pittsburgh, Houston, Anchorage and New Orleans.; United States has an embassy in Zagreb.; Both countries are members of NATO.
Uruguay	4 May 1993	See Croatia–Uruguay relations: Croatia is represented in Uruguay through its embassy in Buenos Aires (Argentina) and consulate in Montevideo.; Uruguay is not represented in Croatia.; According to UN estimates there are some 3,300 people of Croat descent living in Uruguay. Other estimates place the figure at around 5,000.

=== Asia ===
Country	Formal relations began	Notes
Armenia	8 July 1994	See Armenia–Croatia relations: Armenia has an embassy in Zagreb.; Croatia has an honorary consulate in Yerevan.; Both countries are full members of the Council of Europe.
Azerbaijan	26 January 1995	See Azerbaijan–Croatia relations: Azerbaijan has an embassy in Zagreb.; Croatia has an embassy in Baku.; Both countries are full members of the Council of Europe.
China (People's Republic)	13 May 1992	See also: China–Croatia relations: Croatia has an embassy in Beijing and a general consulate in Hong Kong.; China has an embassy in Zagreb.; On 16 May 2002, Croatian president Stjepan Mesić made a state visit to China, while Chinese president Hu Jintao made a state visit to Croatia on 19 June 2009.; On 21 May 2007, Croatian Foreign Minister Kolinda Grabar-Kitarović visited Beijing, and again as President of Croatia on 13–18 October 2015.
Georgia	1 February 1993	See Croatia–Georgia relations: Croatia is represented in Georgia through its embassy in Athens (Greece) and consulate in Tbilisi.; Georgia has an embassy in Zagreb.; Both countries are full members of the Council of Europe.; Croatia is an EU member and Georgia is an EU candidate.
India	9 July 1992	See Croatia–India relations: Croatia has an embassy in New Delhi and 2 consulate in Mumbai and Kolkata.; India has an embassy in Zagreb.; See also Hinduism in Croatia
Iran	18 April 1992	See Croatia–Iran relations: Croatia has an embassy in Tehran.; Iran has an embassy and a cultural centre in Zagreb.; Croatia and Iran signed 24 agreements of cooperation.
Iraq	4 January 2005	Croatia has an embassy in Baghdad.; Iraq has an embassy in Zagreb.
Israel	4 September 1997	See Croatia–Israel relations: Croatia has an embassy in Tel Aviv and 4 consulates in Ashdod, Caesarea, Jerusalem and Kfar Shmaryahu.; Israel has an embassy in Zagreb.; See also History of the Jews in Croatia
Japan	5 March 1993	See Croatia–Japan relations: Croatia has an embassy in Tokyo.; Japan has an embassy in Zagreb.; Princess Sayako visited Croatia in 2002.
Jordan	29 June 1994	Croatia is represented in Jordan through its embassy in Cairo (Egypt) and consulate in Amman.; Jordan is represented in Croatia through its embassy in Rome (Italy) and consulate in Zagreb.
Kazakhstan	20 October 1992	Croatia has an embassy in Astana and honorary consulate in Almaty.; Kazakhstan has an embassy in Zagreb and 2 honorary consulates in Dubrovnik and Umag.; Kazakh President Nursultan Nazarbayev visited Croatia in 2001 and 2006. Croatian high-ranking officials, including President Stjepan Mesić, Prime Minister Zoran Milanović, and Foreign Minister Vesna Pusić also visited Kazakhstan.; Kazakhstan & Croatia recognized 25 years of diplomatic relations in 2017.
Kuwait	10 August 1994	Croatia has an embassy in Kuwait City.; Kuwait is represented in Croatia through its embassy in Prague (Czech Republic) and consulate in Zagreb.
Laos	4 March 1996	Croatia is represented in Laos through its embassy in Kuala Lumpur.
Lebanon	5 December 1994	Croatia is represented in Lebanon through its embassy in Cairo and consulate in Beirut.; Lebanon is represented in Croatia through its embassy in Vienna.; Both countries are full members of the Union for the Mediterranean.
Mongolia	10 March 1993	Croatia is represented in Mongolia through its embassy in Beijing (China) and consulate in Ulaanbaatar.; Mongolia is represented in Croatia through its embassy in Vienna (Austria) and consulate in Zagreb.; Croatian President Stjepan Mesić visited Mongolia in August 2008, while Mongolian President Tsakhia Elbegdorj visited Croatia on 19 October 2011.; During the Mongol invasion of Europe from 1241 to 1242, ancient Mongolians and Croats fought in battles in Pannonia and Dalmatia.
North Korea	30 November 1992	Croatia is represented in North Korea through its embassy in Beijing (China).; North Korea is represented in Croatia through its embassy in Bucharest (Romania).; In January 2016, former Croatian president Stjepan Mesić visited North Korea.
Pakistan	20 July 1994	Croatia is represented in Pakistan through its embassy in Tehran (Iran).; Pakistan is represented in Croatia through its embassy in Sarajevo (Bosnia and Herzegovina) and an honorary consulate in Zagreb.
Qatar	5 December 1992	See Croatia–Qatar relations: Croatia has an embassy in Doha.; Qatar has an embassy in Zagreb.
Saudi Arabia	8 June 1995	See Croatia–Saudi Arabia relations: Croatia is represented in Saudi Arabia through its embassy in Cairo (Egypt).; Saudi Arabia is not represented in Croatia but citizens that need any assistance are advised to contact the Saudi Arabia embassy in Sarajevo (BiH).
South Korea	18 November 1992	See Croatia–South Korea relations The Establishment of diplomatic relations between the Republic of Croatia and the South Korea began on 18 November 1992.: Croatia has an embassy in Seoul.; South Korea has an embassy in Zagreb.; Croatian President Stjepan Mesić visited South Korea in April 2006.; The number of the South Koreans living in Croatia in 2015 was about 88.; Foreign relations of South Korea#Europe.
Sri Lanka	14 February 1997	Croatia is represented in Croatia through its embassy in New Delhi and consulate in Colombo.; Sri Lanka is represented in Sri Lanka through its embassy in Vienna (Austria) and consulate in Zagreb.
Syria	29 August 1997	See Croatia–Syria relations: Croatia is represented in Syria through its embassy in Cairo (Egypt) and consulate in Damascus.; Syria is represented in Croatia through its embassy in Budapest (Hungary).; On 18 January 2013 Croatian Foreign Ministry declared that Croatia, as well as the entire European Union, recognizes the National Coalition for Syrian Revolutionary and Opposition Forces as "only legitimate representatives of the aspirations of the Syrian people".
Tajikistan	1 April 1999	Both countries established diplomatic relations on 1 April 1999.; Both countries are full members of the Organization for Security and Co-operation in Europe.
Thailand	9 September 1992	Croatia is represented in Thailand through its embassy in Jakarta (Indonesia) and through a consulate in Bangkok.; Thailand is represented in Croatia through its embassy in Budapest (Hungary) and through consulate in Zagreb.
Turkey	26 August 1992	See Croatia–Turkey relations: Croatia has an embassy in Ankara and two consulates-general in Istanbul and İzmir.; Turkey has an embassy in Zagreb.; Both countries are full members of the Council of Europe and of NATO.; Both have been EU candidates since 3 October 2005. (Croatia become a member state on 1 July 2013); Croatia is an EU member and Turkey is an EU candidate. Croatia supports Turkey's accession negotiations to the EU, although negotiations have now been suspended.; Turkey has Office of the Defence Attaché and Office of Trading Advisor in Zagreb.
Turkmenistan	2 July 1996	See Croatia–Turkmenistan relations: Croatia is represented in Turkmenistan through its embassy in Ankara (Turkey).; Turkmenistan is represented in Croatia through its embassy in Bucharest (Romania).; Croatian presidents Stjepan Mesić (2008) and Ivo Josipović (2014) as well as the Croatian Prime Minister Zoran Milanović and Foreign Minister Vesna Pusić (5 December 2014) visited Turkmenistan.; Turkmen president Gurbanguly Berdimuhamedov visited Croatia in 2009.
United Arab Emirates	23 June 1992	Croatia is represented in United Arab Emirates through its embassy in Cairo (Egypt).; United Arab Emirates are represented in Croatia through its embassy in Berlin (Germany).

=== Europe ===
Country	Formal relations began	Notes
Albania	25 August 1992	See Albania–Croatia relations: Albania has an embassy in Zagreb.; Croatia has an embassy in Tirana.; Both countries are full members of NATO.; Albania is an EU candidate and Croatia is an EU member.
Austria	15 January 1992	See Austria–Croatia relations: Austria has an embassy in Zagreb and 4 honorary consulates in Dubrovnik, Pula, Rijeka and Split.; Croatia has an embassy in Vienna and 2 honorary consulates in Graz and Innsbruck.; From 1527 until 1918 Croatia and Austria were part of the Austro-Hungarian Empire, with Croatian region Dalmatia being under the Austrian administration.; Both countries are full members of the European Union.
Belarus	25 September 1992	See Belarus–Croatia relations: Croatia is represented in Belarus through its embassy in Moscow (Russia).; Belarus is represented in Croatia through its embassy in Vienna (Austria).; The states maintain their bilateral relations through their embassies in Moscow.; On 16 December 2002 Belarus, Russia, Ukraine, Slovakia, Hungary and Croatia signed an intergovernmental agreement on cooperation within the project to integrate the Druzhba and Adria oil-pipelines in Zagreb.
Belgium	10 March 1992	See Belgium–Croatia relations: Belgium has an embassy in Zagreb and 2 honorary consulates in Dubrovnik and Zadar.; Croatia has an embassy in Brussels and an honorary consulate in Bruges.; Both countries are full members of the European Union and NATO.
Bosnia and Herzegovina	21 July 1992	See Bosnia and Herzegovina–Croatia relations: Croatia has an embassy in Sarajevo and 4 consulates in Sarajevo, Banja Luka, Mostar and Tuzla.; Bosnia and Herzegovina has an embassy in Zagreb.; Croatia and Bosnia and Herzegovina were part of Yugoslavia from 1918 to 1991.; Croats are one out of three constituent nations of BiH.; The two countries share a 932-kilometer (579 mi) border.; Bosnia and Herzegovina is an EU candidate and Croatia is an EU member.
Bulgaria	13 August 1992	See Bulgaria–Croatia relations: Bulgaria has an embassy in Zagreb.; Croatia has an embassy in Sofia.; Both countries are full members of the European Union and NATO.
Cyprus	4 February 1993	See Croatia–Cyprus relations: Croatia is represented in Cyprus through its embassy in Rome (Italy) and an honorary consulate in Nicosia.; Cyprus is represented in Croatia through its embassy in Vienna (Austria) and an honorary consulate in Zagreb.; Both countries are full members of the European Union.
Czech Republic	1 January 1993	See Croatia–Czech Republic relations: Croatia has an embassy in Prague.; Czech Republic has an embassy in Zagreb and 2 honorary consulates in Rijeka and Split.; Both countries are full members of the European Union and NATO.; Croatian Ministry of Foreign Affairs and European Integration: list of bilateral treaties with the Czech Republic
Denmark	1 February 1992	See Croatia–Denmark relations: Croatia has an embassy in Copenhagen and an honorary consulate in Aarhus.; Denmark has an embassy in Zagreb and 3 honorary consulates in Dubrovnik, Rijeka, and Split.; Both countries are full members of the European Union and NATO.
Estonia	2 March 1992	Croatia is represented in Estonia through its embassy in Helsinki, Finland and honorary consulate in Tallinn.; Estonia is represented in Croatia through its embassy in Rome, Italy and honorary consulate in Zagreb.; Both countries are full members of the European Union and NATO.
Finland	19 February 1992	See Croatia–Finland relations: Croatia has an embassy in Helsinki.; Finland has an embassy in Zagreb and 3 honorary consulates in Rijeka, Split and Zagreb.; Both countries are full members of the European Union and NATO.; Croatia fully supported Finland's application to join NATO, which resulted in membership on 4 April 2023.
France	24 April 1992	See Croatia–France relations: Croatia has an embassy in Paris and an honorary consulate in Lyon.; France has an embassy in Zagreb.; Since 2004, Croatia is an observer on the Francophonie.; Both countries are full members of the European Union and NATO.
Germany	15 January 1992	See Croatia–Germany relations: Croatia has an embassy in Berlin and 5 consulates general in Düsseldorf, Frankfurt, Hamburg, Munich and Stuttgart.; Germany has an embassy in Zagreb and an honorary consulate in Split.; Both countries are full members of the European Union and NATO.
Greece	20 July 1992	See Croatia–Greece relations: Greece has an embassy in Zagreb.; Croatia has an embassy in Athens and consulate in Thessaloniki.; Both countries are full members of the European Union and NATO.
Holy See	8 February 1992	See Croatia–Holy See relations: Croatia has a resident embassy to the Holy See in Rome.; Holy See has a nunciature with a nuncio of ambassadorial rank with additional privileges in Zagreb.; According to the 2011 census 86.28% of Croats are Roman Catholic.
Hungary	18 January 1992	See Croatia–Hungary relations: Croatia has an embassy in Budapest, a general consulate in Pécs and an honorary consulate in Nagykanizsa.; Hungary has an embassy in Zagreb and 2 honorary consulates in Rijeka and Split.; From 1102 until 1527 Croatia and Hungary were in a Personal union, and from 1527 until 1918 Austro-Hungarian Empire, most part of Croatia being under Hungarian administration.; Today, both countries share 329 km of common border.; Both countries are full members of the European Union and NATO.
Iceland	30 June 1992	Croatia is represented in Iceland thought it embassy in Copenhagen (Denmark) and consulate in Reykjavík.; Iceland is represented in Croatia thought it embassy in Berlin (Germany) and consulate in Zagreb.; Iceland is the first fully sovereign country that recognized Croatia as an independent state. (19 December 1991); Both countries are full members of NATO.
Ireland	27 January 1995	See Croatia-Ireland relations: Croatia has an embassy and consulate in Dublin.; Ireland has an embassy and consulate in Zagreb.; Both countries are full members of the European Union.
Italy	17 January 1992	See Croatia-Italy relations: Croatia has an embassy in Rome, 2 general consulates in Milan and Trieste and 5 honorary consulates in Bari, Florence, Montemitro, Naples, and Padua.; Italy has an embassy in Zagreb, general consulate in Rijeka, a consulate in Split and 2 honorary consulates in Buje and Pula.; Croatia and Italy share maritime border.; Italy is most important trading partner to Croatia.; Both countries are full members of the European Union and NATO.
Kosovo	30 June 2008	See Croatia–Kosovo relations: Croatia has an embassy Pristina.; Kosovo has an embassy in Zagreb.; Croatia has 27 of its soldiers deployed on Kosovo.
Lithuania	18 March 1992	See Croatia–Lithuania relations: Croatia is represented in Lithuania through the Croatian office in Lithuania which is a branch of Croatian embassy in Stockholm (Sweden).; Lithuania is represented in Croatia through its embassy in Vienna (Austria) and 2 consulate in Zagreb and Starigrad.; Both countries are full members of the European Union and NATO.
Luxembourg	29 April 1992	Croatia is represented in Luxembourg through it embassy in Brussels (Belgium).; Luxembourg is represented in Croatia through it embassy in Berlin (Germany).; Both countries are full members of the European Union and NATO.
Malta	30 June 1992	Croatia is represented in Malta through it embassy in Rome (Italy).; Malta is represented in Croatia through its general embassy in Valletta (Malta) and 2 honorary consulate in Zagreb and Split.; Both countries are full members of the European Union.
Monaco	14 December 2007	Croatia is represented in Monaco through it embassy in Paris (France) and honorary consulate in Monaco.; Monaco is represented in Croatia through its embassy in Rome (Italy) and honorary consulate in Zagreb.
Montenegro	7 July 2006	See Croatia–Montenegro relations: Croatia has an embassy in Podgorica and consulate in Kotor.; Montenegro has an embassy in Zagreb and consulate in Dubrovnik.; From 1918 to 1991 Croatia and Montenegro were part of Yugoslavia.; Relations between the two countries are promoted through the Croatian-Montenegrin Friendship Society "Croatica-Montenegrina".; Both countries are full members of NATO.; Croatia is an EU member and Montenegro is an EU candidate.
Netherlands	23 April 1992	See Croatia–Netherlands relations: Croatia has an embassy in The Hague.; The Netherlands has an embassy in Zagreb and 3 honorary consulates in Dubrovnik, Opatija and Split.; Both countries are full members of the European Union and NATO.
North Macedonia	30 March 1992	See Croatia–North Macedonia relations: Croatia has an embassy in Skopje, and the general consulate in Bitola.; North Macedonia has an embassy in Zagreb and 2 consulates in Zadar and Rijeka.; From 1918 to 1991 Croatia and North Macedonia were part of Yugoslavia.; Both countries are full members of NATO.; Croatia is an EU member and North Macedonia is an EU candidate.
Norway	20 February 1992	See Croatia–Norway relations: Croatia has an embassy in Oslo.; Norway has an embassy in Zagreb and 2 consulate in Rijeka and Dubrovnik.; Both countries are full members of NATO.
Poland	11 April 1992	See Croatia–Poland relations: Croatia has an embassy in Warsaw and 5 consulates in Kraków, Poznań, Białystok, Bydgoszcz and Opole.; Poland has an embassy in Zagreb and consulate in Opatija.; Poland has Office of Military Attaché and Department of Trade and Investment Promotion of the Polish Embassy in Zagreb.; Both countries are full members of the European Union and NATO.
Romania	29 August 1992	See Croatia–Romania relations: Croatia has an embassy in Bucharest.; Romania has an embassy in Zagreb and consulate in Rijeka.; Both countries are full members of the European Union and NATO.; See also Istro-Romanians
Russia	25 May 1992	See Croatia–Russia relations: Croatia has an embassy in Moscow and an honorary consulate in Kaliningrad.; Russia has an embassy in Zagreb.; Both countries are full members of the Council of Europe (before Russia was suspended in March 2022) and the Organization for Security and Co-operation in Europe.
San Marino	11 February 1993	Croatia is represented in San Marino through its embassy in Rome (Italy).; San Marino is represented in Croatia through its General embassy in San Marino.; According to legend San Marino was founded in year 301 by sculptor Saint Marinus from the Croatian island of Rab.
Serbia	9 September 1996 then as FR Yugoslavia and including Montenegro	See Croatia–Serbia relations: Croatia has an embassy in Belgrade and a general consulate in Subotica.; Serbia has an embassy in Zagreb and 2 general consulates in Rijeka and Vukovar.; Both countries shares 241 km of common border.; From 1918 to 1991 Croatia and Serbia were part of Yugoslavia.; Croatia is full member of the European Union while Serbia is candidate for membership.
Slovakia	1 January 1993	See Croatia–Slovakia relations: Croatia has an embassy in Bratislava.; Slovakia has an embassy in Zagreb and consulate in Osijek. In addition, since 2014 Slovak Embassy operates temporary office in Zadar during the summer.; Both countries are full members of the European Union and NATO.
Slovenia	6 February 1992	See Croatia–Slovenia relations: Croatia has an embassy in Ljubljana and 2 honorary consulates in Maribor and Koper.; Slovenia has an embassy in Zagreb and an honorary consulate in Split.; Both countries shares 670 km of common border.; From 1918 to 1991 Croatia and Slovenia were part of Yugoslavia.; Both countries are full members of the European Union and NATO.
Spain	9 March 1992	See Croatia–Spain relations: Croatia has an embassy in Madrid and 4 honorary consulates in Barcelona, Palma de Mallorca, Pamplona and Seville.; Spain has an embassy in Zagreb and 2 honorary consulates in Dubrovnik and Split.; Both countries are full members of the European Union and NATO.
Sweden	29 January 1992	See Croatia–Sweden relations: Croatia has an embassy in Stockholm and 2 honorary consulates in Gothenburg and Malmö.; Sweden has an embassy in Zagreb and 2 honorary consulates in Rijeka and Split.; Both countries are full members of the European Union and NATO.; Croatia fully supported Sweden's application to join NATO, which resulted in membership on 7 March 2024.
Switzerland	30 January 1992	See Croatia–Switzerland relations: Croatia has an embassy in Bern, a general consulate in Zürich and 2 honorary consulates in Lugano and Massagno.; Switzerland has an embassy in Zagreb, consulate in Split and honorary consulate in Smoljanci.; More than 45,000 Croats live in Switzerland.
Ukraine	18 February 1992	See Croatia–Ukraine relations: Croatia has an embassy in Kyiv.; Ukraine has an embassy in Zagreb and 2 consulates in Zadar and Malinska.; Both countries are full members of the Council of Europe.; Croatia is an EU member and Ukraine is an EU candidate.
United Kingdom	24 June 1992	See Croatia–United Kingdom relations Croatia established diplomatic relations with the United Kingdom on 24 June 1992.: Croatia maintains an embassy in London.; The United Kingdom is accredited to Croatia through its embassy in Zagreb.; Both countries share common membership of the Council of Europe, European Court of Human Rights, the International Criminal Court, NATO, OSCE, and the World Trade Organization. Bilaterally the two countries have a Double Taxation Agreement, and an Investment Agreement.: Croatia is a EU member and the United Kingdom is a former EU member.

=== Oceania ===
Country	Formal Relations Began	Notes
Australia	13 February 1992	See Australia–Croatia relations: Australia has an embassy in Zagreb.; Croatia has an embassy in Canberra and three consulates general in Melbourne, Perth and Sydney.; Since 2006, 118,051 people living in Australia declared themselves as Croats. Australian Ministry of Foreign Affairs believes that in Australia live around 150,000 Croats while the Croatian community in Australia claims to have 250,000 members.
Nauru	14 December 2000	Croatia is represented in Nauru through its embassy in Canberra (Australia).; Nauru is not represented in Croatia.
New Zealand	25 February 1992	Croatia is represented in New Zealand through its embassy in Canberra (Australia) and through consulate in Auckland.; New Zealand is represented in Croatia through its embassy in Rome (Italy) and through an honorary consulate in Zagreb.

== See also ==
- List of diplomatic missions in Croatia
- List of diplomatic missions of Croatia
- Visa requirements for Croatian citizens
- Croatia and the European Union
- Croatia–NATO relations
