= Croatia–NATO relations =

- NATO: Croatia

Croatia has been a member of military alliance NATO since 2009, supporting the organization through multilateral cooperation and defence policies. The country entered into Partnership for Peace in 2000, which began the process of accession into the alliance. It received an invitation to join at the 2008 Bucharest NATO summit and became a full member a year later on April 1.

== History ==
=== 20th century ===
Croatia's first relations with NATO were established in 1953. That year Yugoslavia entered into the Balkan Pact, a loose military alliance with Greece and Turkey, then both recent NATO members. Croatia had considered holding a referendum on NATO membership. On March 23, 2007, the Croatian president Stjepan Mesić, Prime Minister Ivo Sanader and President of parliament Vladimir Šeks declared that the Croatian constitution does not require a referendum on this issue. In 2006 the Croatian government was planning to start a media campaign to promote the benefits of membership. In February 2008 a project named Bolje pakt nego rat was formed by Transparency International Croatia and iDEMO, and financed by the United States embassy in Croatia, in order to promote the NATO membership through public discussions about its benefits.

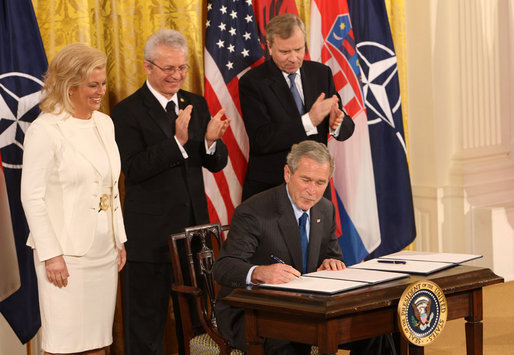
U.S. President George W. Bush (center) signing off on Croatia's NATO accession in 2008, with Croatian president Kolinda Grabar-Kitarovic (left).

A May 2007 poll commissioned by the government showed that NATO membership was backed by 52% of the population, and 25% was against. On January 4, 2008, Croatian Prime minister Ivo Sanader reached a coalition agreement with partners from HSS and HSLS to form a new government. According to a provision of the said agreement Croatia's entry into NATO would not be decided on a referendum.

=== 21st century ===
Croatia has been a member of the International Security Assistance Force (ISAF) in Afghanistan since December 12, 2002. In 2003 Croatia joined the Adriatic Charter along with other NATO aspirants. In November, 2006 the State Committee for the Membership of Croatia in NATO was established, with Croatian president Stjepan Mesić serving as committee president, and speaker Vladimir Šeks and prime minister Ivo Sanader serving as its vice-presidents. In June, 2007 the Croatian Parliament and the NATO parliamentary Assembly held a three-day conference in Dubrovnik entitled "Southeast Europe: Unfinished business", to discuss security and political issues in the region. The Noble Midas 07 NATO exercise held in Croatia in October, 2007 was the first time in the alliance's history that it held a military exercise in a non-member country. Croatia hosted a meeting of defense ministers on NATO's role in southeastern Europe in March, 2009.

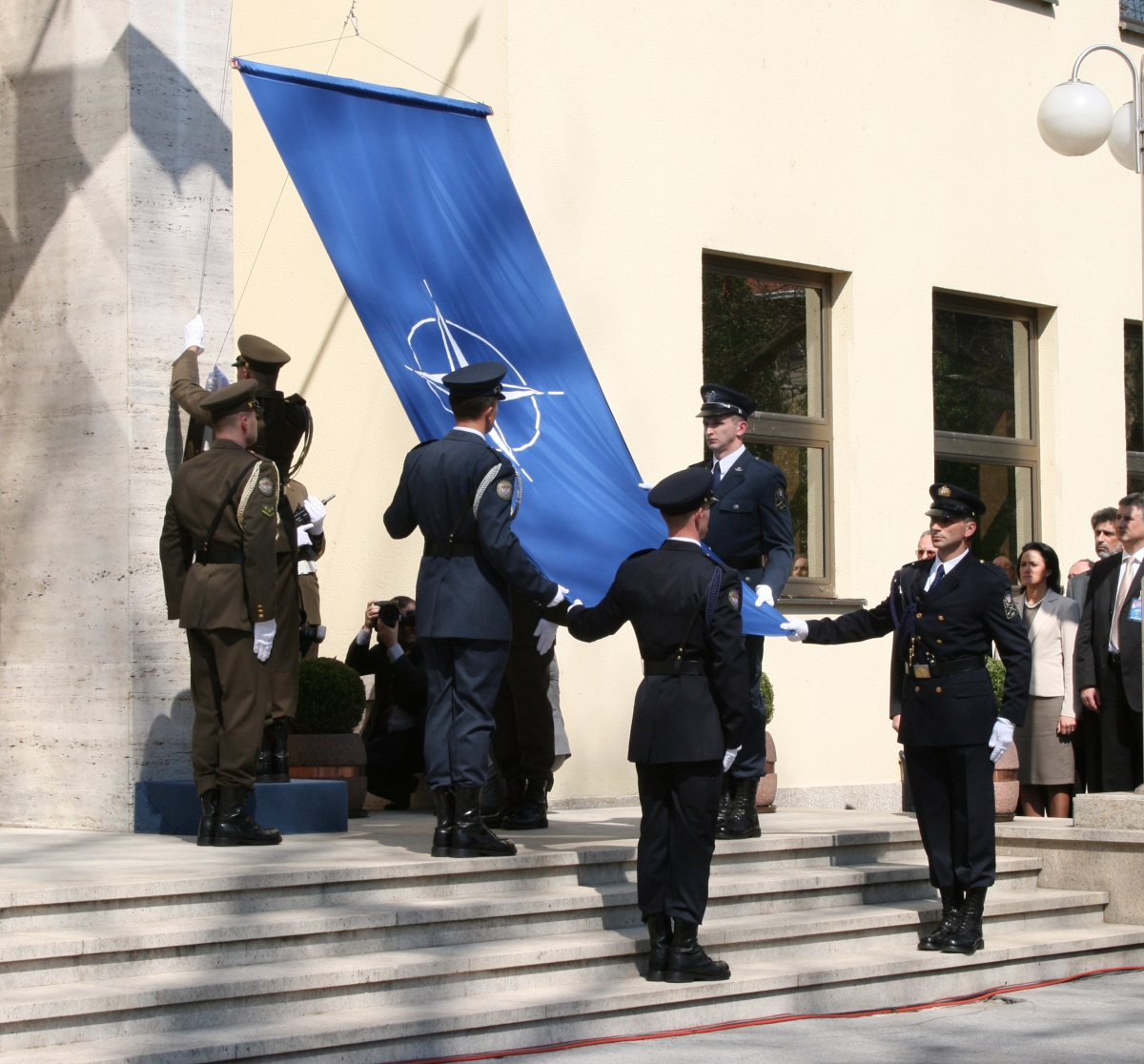
The NATO flag on display in Zagreb, 2009

On January 1, 2008 Croatia abandoned military conscription and finished its transition to a fully professional army. The Armed Forces of Croatia joined the NATO-led Kosovo Force (KFOR) in 2009. The Croatian minister of foreign affairs Gordan Jandroković was invited to the movement's 15th Conference, held in Iran in July, 2008. Croatian ambassador to Iran, Esad Prohić, served as Croatian representative.

Croatian president Zoran Milanović stated that his country should block ratification of Finland and Sweden's NATO accession until electoral reform measures are implemented in neighbouring Bosnia and Herzegovina, though the Foreign Minister expressed the government's support for any application. On 28 April 2022, Foreign Minister Gordan Grlić-Radman announced that Croatia supported Finland and Sweden's applications for membership in NATO. In July 2022, Croatia fully ratified Finland and Sweden's NATO membership application.

As part of the further strengthening of the European deterrence against Russian aggression in Ukraine, NATO launched an enhanced vigilance activity in February 2022, which led to the formation of Croatian battlegroups in Hungary, Slovakia, Romania and Bulgaria in July. The Croatian government provided over €300 million in military aid to Ukraine as part of broader efforts within NATO that year. Since September 2025, Croatian diplomat Mirko Ujdenica has served as the chargé d'affaires to NATO.

== Negotiation timeline ==
Event	Date
Partnership for Peace	2000-05-25
Membership Action Plan	2002-05-20
Invitation to join	2008-04-03
Accession protocol	2008-07-09
Domestic ratification	2009-03-25
Ratification by:
Belgium	2009-01-29
Bulgaria	2008-10-23
Canada	2009-01-14
Czech Republic	2008-12-22
Denmark	2008-12-09
Estonia	2008-12-19
France	2009-02-04
Germany	2008-12-19
Greece	2009-02-17
Hungary	2008-09-15
Iceland	2009-02-12
Italy	2008-12-23
Latvia	2008-09-18
Lithuania	2008-10-06
Luxembourg	2009-02-12
Netherlands	2009-02-17
Norway	2008-11-24
Poland	2008-10-21
Portugal	2009-02-13
Romania	2008-10-21
Slovakia	2008-10-24
Slovenia	2009-02-09
Spain	2008-12-18
Turkey	2008-11-26
United Kingdom	2008-12-19
United States	2008-09-26
Member of NATO	2009-04-01

== Foreign relations with NATO members ==
- Albania
- Belgium
- Bulgaria
- Canada
- Czech Republic
- Denmark
- Estonia
- Finland
- France
- Germany
- Greece
- Hungary
- Iceland
- Italy
- Latvia
- Lithuania
- Luxembourg
- Montenegro
- Netherlands
- North Macedonia
- Norway
- Poland
- Portugal
- Romania
- Slovakia
- Slovenia
- Spain
- Sweden
- Turkey
- United Kingdom
- United States

== See also ==
- Defence industry of Croatia
- Foreign relations of Croatia
- 2013 enlargement of the European Union
