= Croatia and the European Union =

Croatia–European Union relations

- Croatia: European Union

Croatia has been a member of the European Union since 2013.

== History ==
The accession of Croatia to the European Union was completed in 2013.

Croatia first hosted the rotating Presidency of the Council of the European Union in the first half of 2020.

The country adopted the euro as its currency and joined the Schengen Area in 2023.

== Croatia's foreign relations with EU member states ==
- Austria
- Belgium
- Bulgaria
- Cyprus
- Czech Republic
- Denmark
- Estonia
- Finland
- France
- Germany
- Greece
- Hungary
- (Republic of Ireland) Ireland
- Italy
- Latvia
- Lithuania
- Luxembourg
- Malta
- Netherlands
- Poland
- Portugal
- Romania
- Slovakia
- Slovenia
- Spain
- Sweden

== See also ==
- Foreign relations of Croatia
- Foreign relations of the European Union
- 2013 enlargement of the European Union
- Yugoslavia–European Communities relations

== Bibliography ==
- Office for International and European Affairs (ed.). "Kronologija važnijih datuma u procesu pristupanja Hrvatske Europskoj uniji" [Chronology of important dates in the process of Croatia's accession to the European Union] (in Croatian). Croatian Parliament.
- Jurčić, Ljubo (2015). "Stanje hrvatskog gospodarstva - Hrvatska u Europskoj uniji" [The state of the Croatian economy - Croatia in the European Union]. Economic Review (in Croatian). 66 (6). Zagreb: Hrvatsko društvo ekonomista. ISSN 1848-9494 – via Hrčak.
- Jurčić, Ljubo (2019). "Hrvatska stagnira u Europskoj uniji" [Croatia’s stagnation in the EU]. Economic Review (in Croatian). 70 (6). Zagreb: Hrvatsko društvo ekonomista. ISSN 1848-9494 – via Hrčak.
- Buturac, Goran (2019). "Gospodarski rast, konvergencija i članstvo u EU: Empirijski dokazi iz Hrvatske" [Economic growth, convergence and EU membership: Empirical evidence from Croatia]. Economic Review (in Croatian). 70 (2). Zagreb: Hrvatsko društvo ekonomista. doi:10.32910/ep.70.2.2. ISSN 1848-9494.
- Materljan, Igor (2019). "Hrvatski predmeti na sudovima europske unije" [Croatian cases before EU courts]. Croatian Academy of Legal Sciences Yearbook (in Croatian). X (1). Zagreb: Croatian Academy of Legal Sciences. ISSN 1849-0778 – via Hrčak.
- Samodol, Ante (2021). "Demografske promjene i mirovinski sustavi u Europskoj uniji: primjer Hrvatske" [Demographic change and pension systems in the EU ‑ case of Croatia]. International Studies (in Croatian). XXI (1). Zagreb: Libertas international university. ISSN 2459-623X – via Hrčak.
