= Croatia–Greece relations =

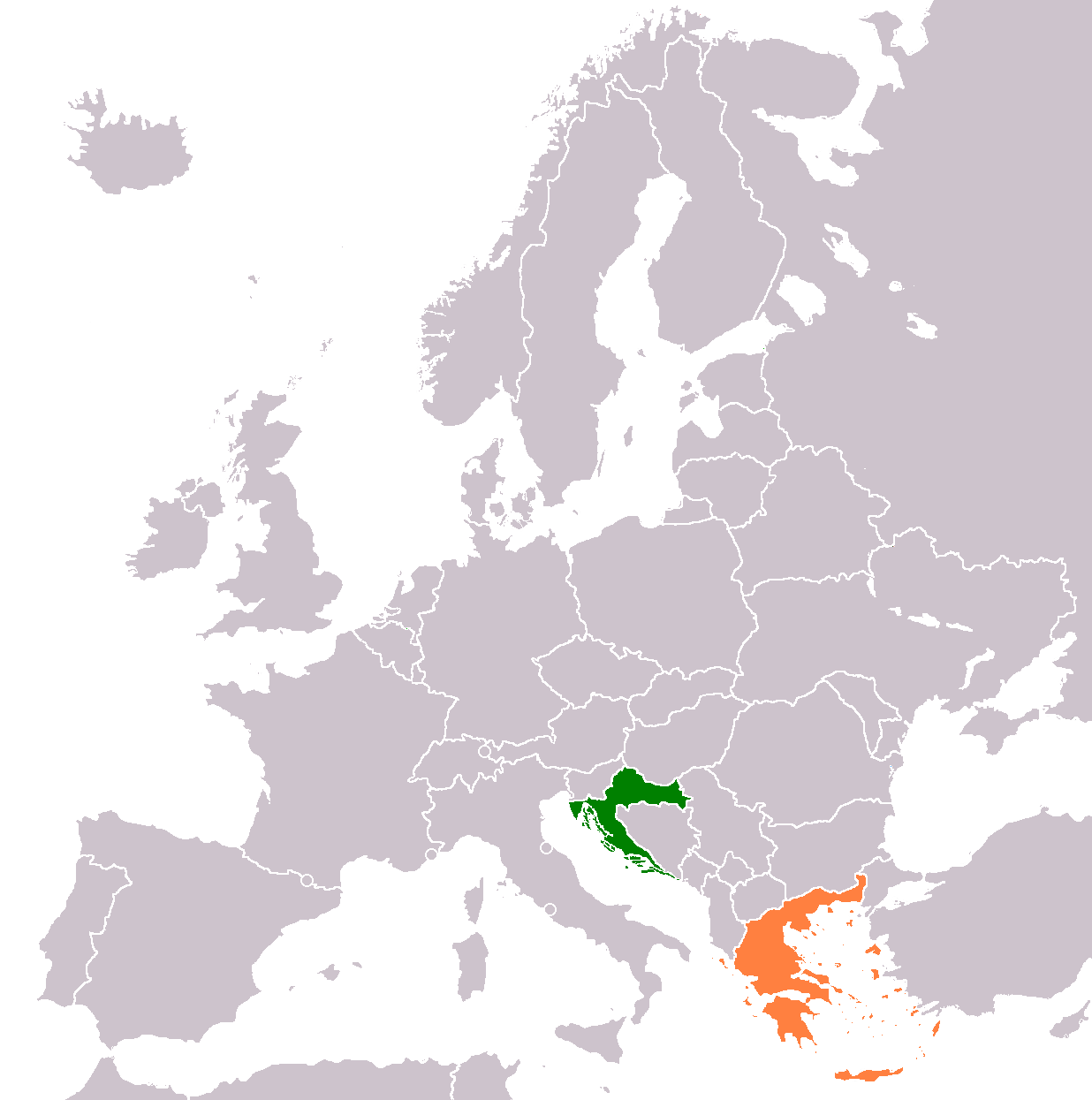

- Croatia: Greece

Croatia and Greece established diplomatic relations on July 20, 1992. Since November 1994, Greece has an embassy in Zagreb. Croatia has an embassy in Athens. The relations between Croatia and Greece have been regarded as excellent with a high cooperation between the two countries on the economic, touristic and political aspect. Greece was a key supporter during the accession process of Croatia to the EU. Both countries are full members of the NATO, EU and of the Council of Europe.

== List of state visits ==
- President of Greece, Konstantinos Stephanopoulos, visited Croatia in May 2001, whilst President Mesić of Croatia paid an official visit to Athens from November 18–20, 2003.
- Prime Minister of Greece, Kostas Karamanlis, met with his Prime Minister of Croatia, Ivo Sanader, in Thessaloniki on October 21, 2004 on the occasion of the Congress of Orthodox Churches and the Congress of European Peoples Parties.
- On November 3, 2009, the President of Croatia, Stjepan Mesić, visited Athens.

== List of bilateral agreements ==
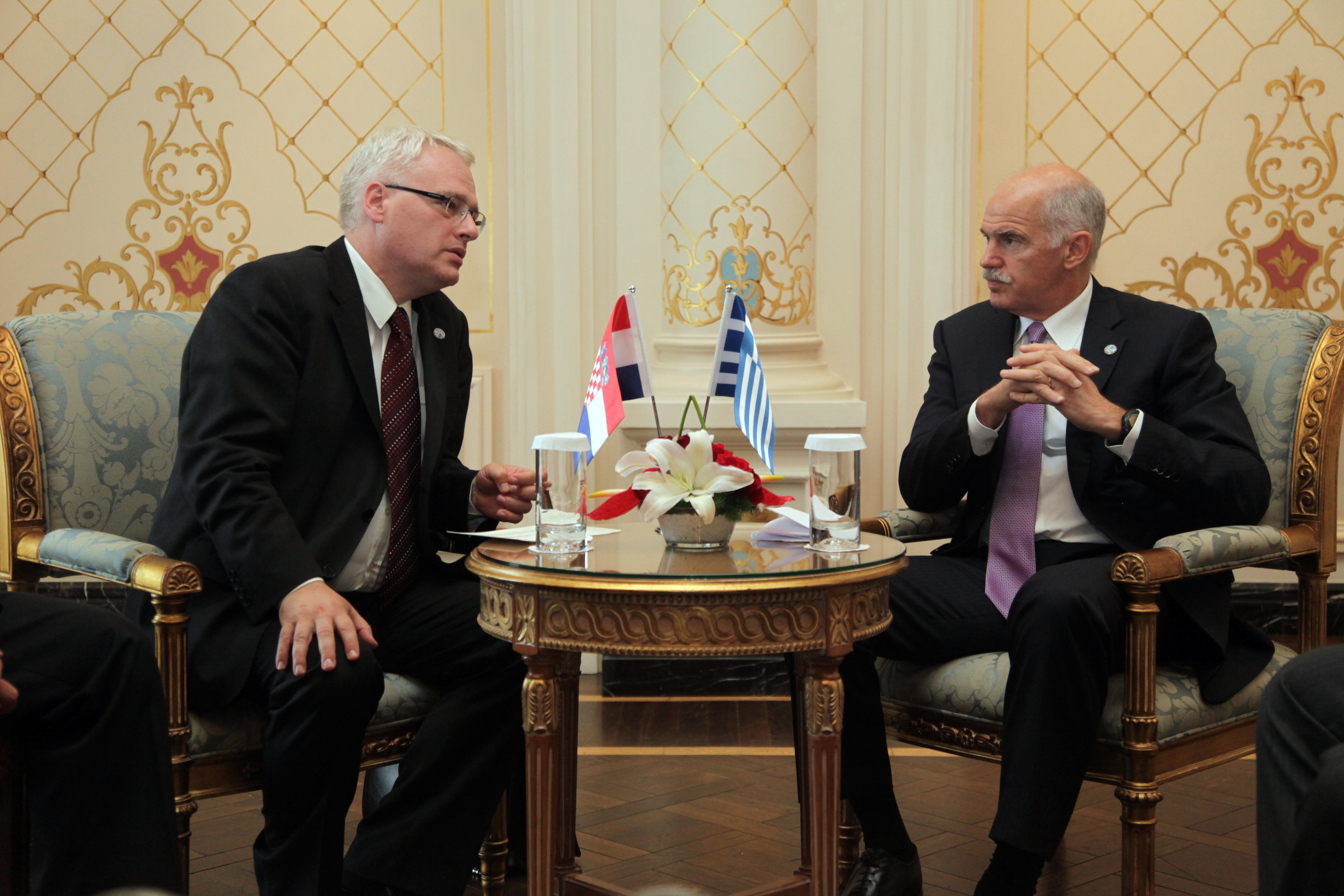
Croatian President Ivo Josipović (left) and Greek Prime Minister Georges Papandreou during the South-East Europe Cooperation Process (SEECP) Summit in June 2010

- Agreement on the Establishment of Diplomatic Relations
- Protocol of Cooperation between the Foreign Ministries of Greece and Croatia (Athens, November 24, 1992)
- Agreement on Economic Cooperation (Zagreb, September 13, 1994)
- Agreement on Mutual Abolition of the Visa Requirement for Short-Term Stay (Athens, March 10, 1995)
- Agreement on the Return of Illegal Residents (Athens, March 10, 1995)
- Cultural, Educational and Scientific Cooperation Agreement, (Athens, March 10, 1995)
- Agreement on Avoidance of Double Taxation on Income and Capital (Zagreb, October 18, 1996)
- Agreement on the Promotion and Mutual Protection of Investments (Zagreb, October 18, 1996)
- Agreement on International Road Passenger and Freight Transport (Zagreb, January 17, 1996)
- Military Cooperation Agreement (Athens, June 27, 2000)
- Maritime Transport Agreement (Zagreb, May 23, 2001)
- Greek-Croatian Foreign Ministries Cooperation Protocol (Athens, November 24, 1992)
- Air Transport Agreement (Athens, February 27, 2001)

== Cultural relations ==
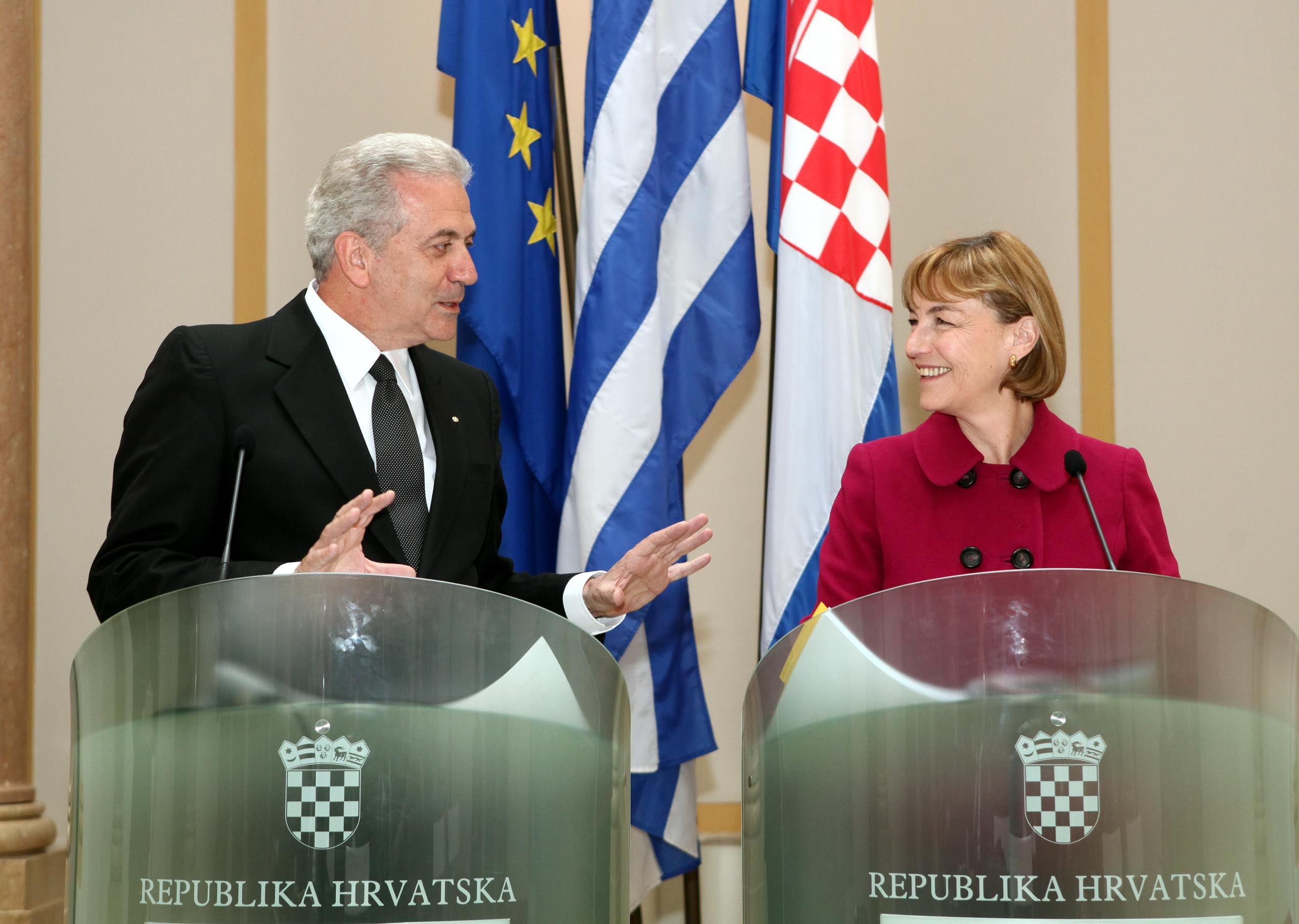
Greek Foreign Minister Dimitris Avramopoulos and Croatian Foreign Minister Vesna Pusić in April 2013

Cultural relations between the two countries are governed by the 1995 Bilateral Cultural Agreement. A Chair in Modern Greek Language and Literature has been established at the University of Zagreb.

== Economics relations ==
Croatia and Greece have been cooperating on tourism with a high level of exchange of tourists to each other. Approximately 16.000 Croatians visited Greece in 2012 and in 2006 7,000 Greeks visited Croatia, indicating an increase from 2005 when 5,000 Greeks visited Croatia. In 2012 the Commercial and Consular Attaché at the Embassy of the Croatia in Athens Anna-Marija Muselimović has supported that all relevant agreements regulating economic cooperation and transport between Greece and Croatia have been signed and are in force and trade between the two countries is capable of further increasing. The main source of trade between Croatia and Greece is based on the number of orders of ships to be built by Croatian shipyards for Greek shipowners.

== European Union ==
Greece joined the EU in 1981. Croatia joined the EU in 2013.

== NATO ==
Greece joined NATO in 1952. Croatia joined NATO in 2009.

== Resident diplomatic missions ==
- Croatia has an embassy in Athens.
- Greece has an embassy in Zagreb.
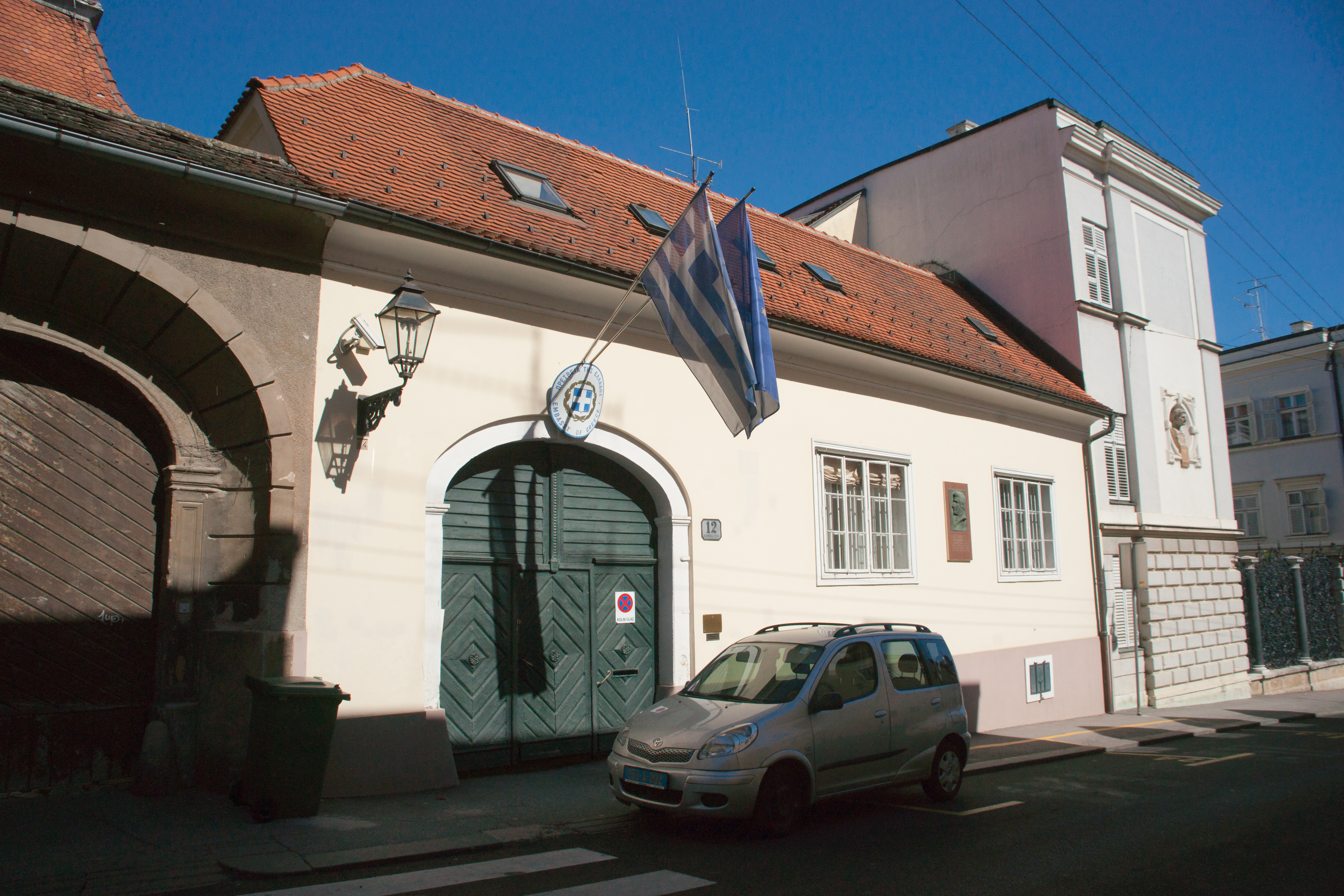
Embassy of Greece in Zagreb

== See also ==
- Foreign relations of Croatia
- Foreign relations of Greece
- Croatia in the EU
- NATO-EU relations
- Greece–Yugoslavia relations
- Croatia–Turkey relations
