= Austria–Croatia relations =

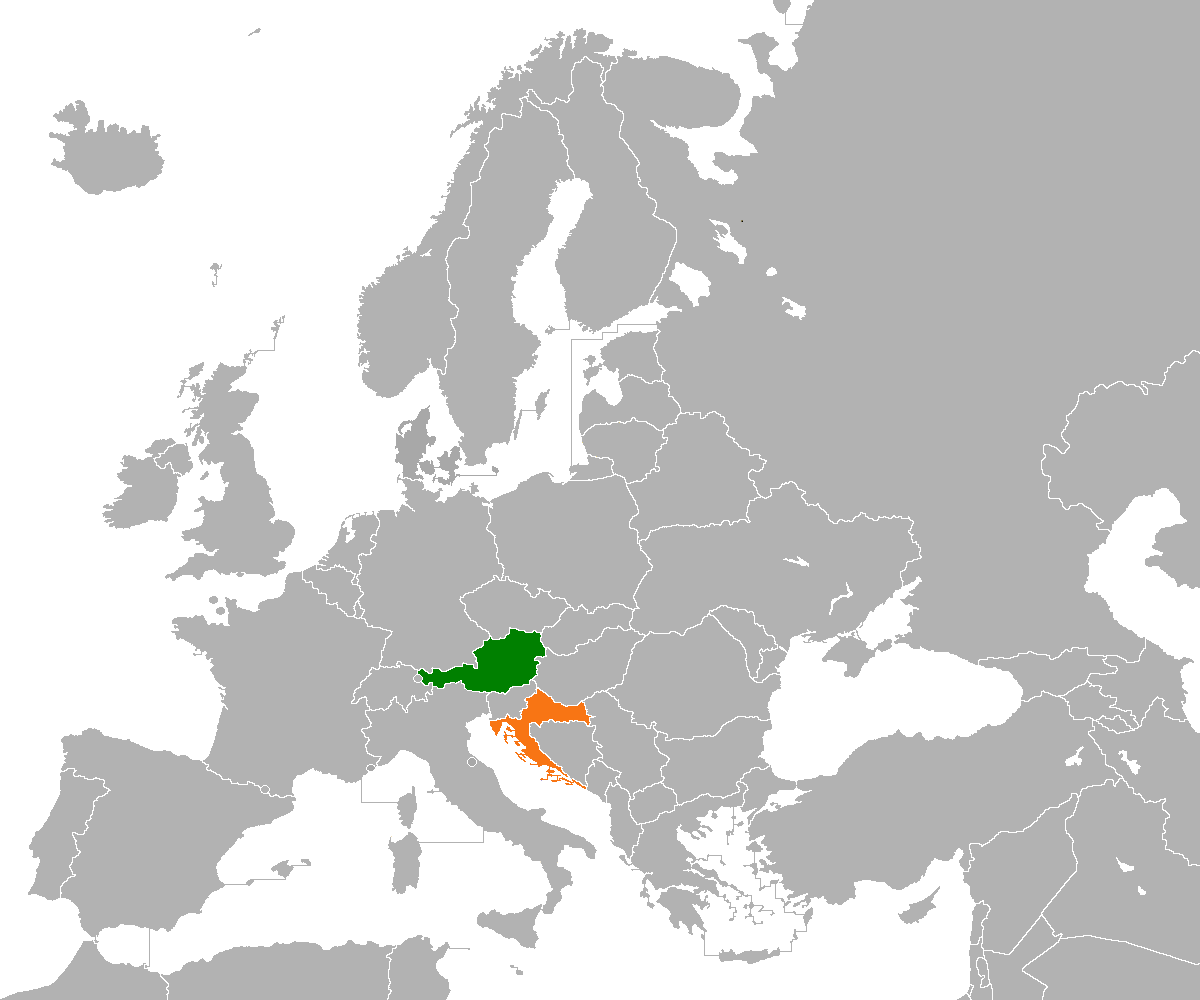

- Austria: Croatia

Diplomatic mission
- Austrian embassy in Zagreb: Croatian embassy in Vienna

Envoy
- Andreas Wiedenhoff: Vesna Cvjetković

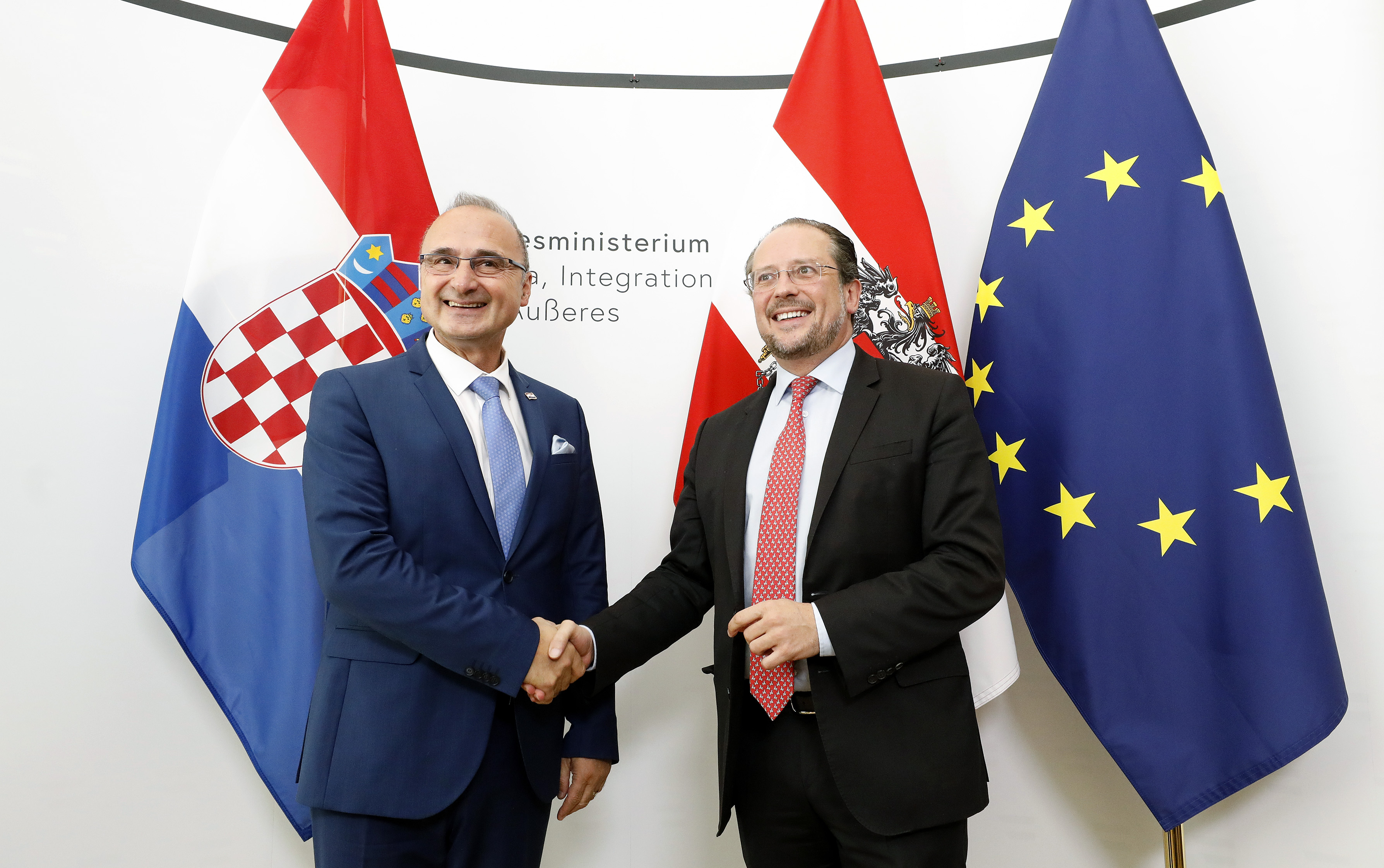
Croatian foreign minister Gordan Grlić-Radman meets with Austrian foreign minister Alexander Schallenberg in Vienna on 13 September 2019

A bilateral relationship exists between Croatia and Austria. Diplomatic relations between the two countries were established on January 15, 1992, following Croatia's independence from SFR Yugoslavia.

Croatia and Austria were part of the same union for almost 400 years: the Habsburg monarchy (1527–1804), the Austrian Empire (1804–1867) and the Austro-Hungarian Empire (1867–1918), with the Croatian regions of Istria and Dalmatia being under Austrian rule from the 1867 Compromise until the 1918 collapse.

Croatia has an embassy in Vienna, and honorary consulates in Graz, Linz, St. Pölten, and Salzburg. Austria has an embassy in Zagreb, a general consulate in Rijeka, and a consulate in Split, as well as the Office of the Coordinator for Educational Cooperation, the Austrian Cultural Forum, the Office for Foreign Trade, the Office of the Attaché for Agricultural and Environmental Questions, and the Office of the Police Liaison in Zagreb.

There are around 120,000 Croats that live in Austria, out of which 56,785 have Croatian citizenship. The most recognizable Austrian Croats are the Burgenland Croats that live in the Austrian state of Burgenland. 297 Austrians in Croatia are officially recognized as a minority by the Croatian Constitution and therefore have their own permanent seat in the Croatian Parliament.

Both countries are full members of the Council of Europe and of the European Union. Austria has given full support to Croatia's membership of the European Union.

== History ==
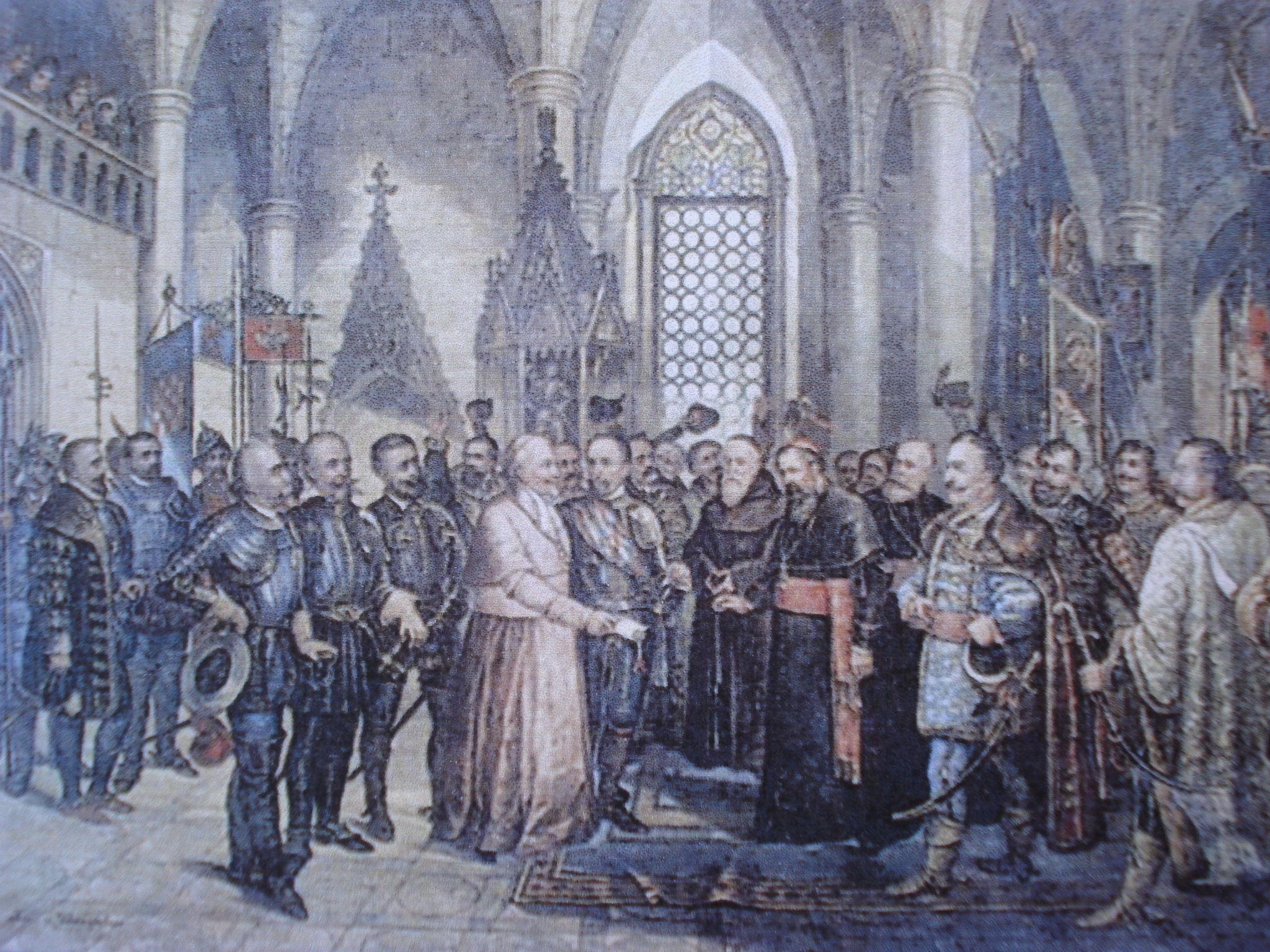
Croatian high nobility elected Ferdinand I of the House of Habsburg as King of Croatia in 1527

After the death of King Louis II of Hungary at Mohács monarchical crisis in the Kingdom of Hungary occurred. The Croatian Parliament met in 1527 in the town of Cetin and chose Ferdinand I of the House of Habsburg as new ruler of Croatia, under the condition that he provides protection to Croatia against the Ottoman Empire in the Croatian–Ottoman War while respecting its political rights, although he later failed to fulfill this promise.

Austro-Croatian relations have been close for most of modern history. Several heroes of Croatian history and culture were of Austrian origin, and the country was one of the strongest in favor of Croatian recognition in the 1990s when Croatia declared its independence from SFR Yugoslavia.

Austria has also influenced the development of education in Croatia. First Gymnasiums in Zagreb (1607), Rijeka (1627) and Varaždin (1636) were founded by the Jesuits from the Augustineum Training College.

Many famous Croats like Janko Drašković, Dimitrije Demeter, Ljudevit Gaj, Stanko Vraz, Vatroslav Lisinski, Blagoje Bersa, Božidar Širola, Jakov Gotovac, Ivan Zajc, and Ivan Meštrović have acquired higher education at the Universities of Vienna and Graz.

== Economic relations ==
There are more than 700 Austrian companies in Croatia.

Austria is also the largest foreign investor in Croatia, with more than 7 billion euros invested from 1993 to 2014. Cooperation between Austrian and Croatian entrepreneurs is most often in the field of metal, electrical industry, wood processing, textile and footwear industry, and food industry in the form of healthy food.

== Tourism ==
Croatia and Austria are founders and members of The Alps-Adriatic Working Group. Goals of this organisation are mutual communication, discussion, and coordination of the points of interest of the member states, development of cooperation and exchanges in the Alpine-Adriatic region, strengthening of the Central European cultural identity, and participation in the processes of European cooperation and integration. Main areas of cooperation are sports, tourism, environmental protection, connecting cities, preservation of cultural and recreational spaces, culture and science, and European integration.

Austrian nobility started visiting the Croatian coast in the 1880s. Opatija became a fashionable destination for the Austrian imperial family and the Austrian nobility. Soon, many luxury hotels and villas were built. The first luxury hotel – Hotel "Quarnero" (1884) (today "Grand Hotel Kvarner") was built according to the plans by Viennese architect Franz Wilhelm. The hotel Kronprinzessin Stephanie was opened in 1885. Crown princess Stephanie, after whom the hotel was named, and her husband Crown Prince Rudolf appeared at the opening. In 1887, Heinrich von Littrow established the "Union Yacht Club Quarnero" in Opatija, which was the first sailing club on the Adriatic. In 1889, Austrian government officially declared Opatija as the first climatic seaside resort on the Adriatic. Evan today Austrians are among the most frequent visitors of the Croatian coast, while Croats are frequent visitors of Austrian ski resorts. In 2018, 1.37 million Austrian tourists visited Croatia. They accounted for 7.065 million overnight stays, behind only German and Slovenian tourists in the overall number of overnight stays of foreign visitors.

== Croatian (cultural) organizations in Austria ==
Today, there is a significant number of Croatian institutions in Austria. Some of them are:

- Croatian Cultural Center
- Burgenland Croatian Center
- Scientific Institute of the Burgenland Croats
- Croatian Cultural Association in Burgenland
- Croatian-Burgenland Cultural Association
- Croatian Press Association of Eisenstadt - publishes the weekly "Croatian newspaper" (Hrvatske novine), an annual calendar, as well as books on the Burgenland-Croatian language
- Croatian literature
- Croatian cultural and Documentation Centre - prints textbooks for the needs of Croatian bilingual schools in Burgenland
- Croatian Cultural Society - publishes the newspaper "Croatian media outlet" (Hrvatsko glasilo)

Burgenland Croats have all kinds of their own newspapers, radio, news portals (like kroativ.at) and TV programs in the framework of the ORF.

Croatian Catholic Mission in Vienna is also very active religious-cultural organization.

Matica hrvatska has a branch in Vienna.

== Education of Croats in Austria ==
Classes in the Croatian are being held in some Austrian schools. There is a bilingual primary school in Großwarasdorf and a gymnasium in Bort. Teaching Croatian is carried out in three grammar schools in Oberpullendorf and Eisenstadt. Vienna and Burgenland have few kindergartens in which young children can learn or improve Croatian.

== Other ==
Austrian Foreign Minister Sebastian Kurz chose Croatia as the first destination that he visited upon his appointment. On 20 December 2013, Mr. Kurz met in Zagreb with Croatian Minister of Foreign and European Affairs Vesna Pusić.

In year 1955, Austrian Cultural Forum was founded in Zagreb. It is an organization that promotes Austrian culture and German language in Croatia.

== the European Union and NATO ==
Austria joined the EU in 1995. Croatia joined the EU in 2013. While Croatia became a member of NATO in 2009, Austria has never been a member of NATO.

== Resident diplomatic missions ==
- Austria has an embassy in Zagreb.
- Croatia has an embassy in Vienna.

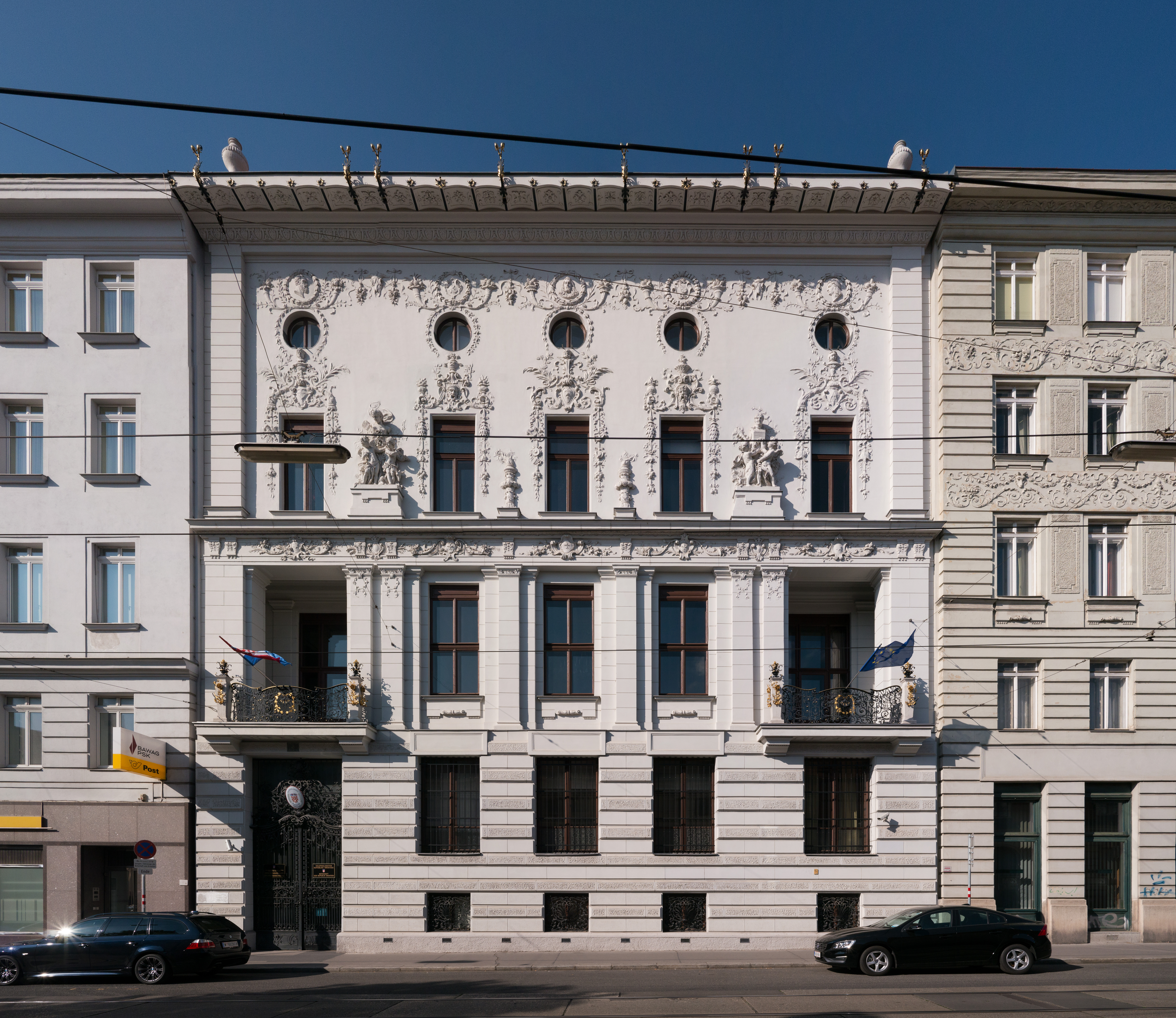
Embassy of Croatia in Vienna

== See also ==
- Foreign relations of Austria
- Foreign relations of Croatia
- Croats of Austria
- Austrians of Croatia
- Austria–Yugoslavia relations
- Croatia in the European Union
