= Diplomatic missions of the Independent State of Croatia =

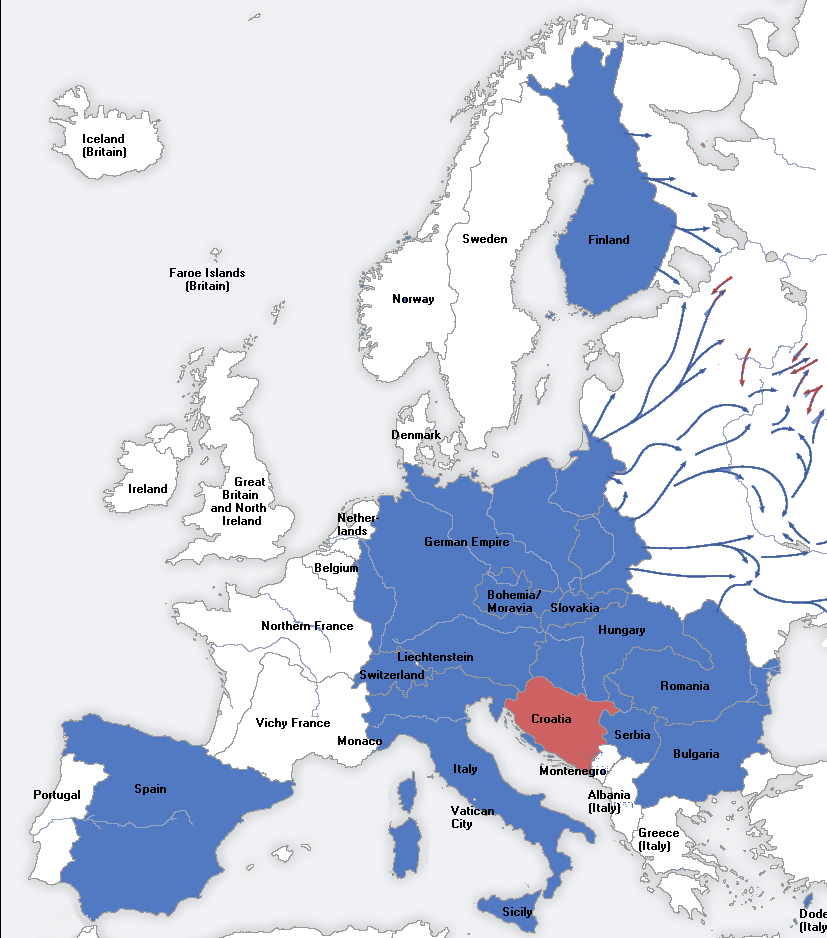
Diplomatic missions of the Independent State of Croatia

The Independent State of Croatia (1941–1945) was a European country located in Southern Europe, corresponding approximately to today's Croatia and Bosnia and Herzegovina. Listed below are its embassies and consulates:

- Protectorate of Bohemia and Moravia
  - Prague (General consulate)
- Kingdom of Bulgaria
  - Sofia (Embassy)
- Finland
  - Helsinki (Embassy)
- Nazi Germany
  - Berlin (Embassy)
  - Vienna (General consulate)
  - Graz (Consulate)
  - Ljubljana (from 1943, Consulate)
- Kingdom of Hungary
  - Budapest (Embassy)
- Kingdom of Italy (Fascist Italy)
  - Rome (Embassy)
  - Milan (General consulate)
  - Ljubljana (until 1943, Consulate)
  - Zadar (General consulate)
- Kingdom of Romania
  - Bucharest (Embassy)
- Government of National Salvation (Territory of the Military Commander in Serbia)
  - Belgrade (Consular representation)
- Slovak Republic
  - Bratislava (Embassy)
- Francoist Spain
  - Madrid (Embassy)
- Switzerland
  - Zürich (Permanent commerce delegation)

== See also ==
- Foreign relations of the Independent State of Croatia
