= Croatia–South Korea relations =

- South Korea: Croatia

Croatia–South Korea relations refer to the diplomatic relations between Croatia and South Korea, encompassing political, economic, cultural, and people-to-people exchanges. Since establishing diplomatic relations in 1992, the two countries have developed their relationship based on mutual respect and international norms. In 2023, the relationship was elevated to a comprehensive, future-oriented partnership.

Croatia and South Korea cooperate in international organizations, including the United Nations, working together on peacekeeping, adherence to international norms, and development cooperation.

== History ==
Croatia declared its independence in 1991 during the dissolution of the Socialist Federal Republic of Yugoslavia and subsequently gained recognition from the international community, expanding its diplomatic relations. Within this context, South Korea established official diplomatic relations with Croatia in 1992. Since then, the two countries have developed their relationship based on shared values of democracy, market economy, and the rule of law in the post-Cold War international order.

In 2005, South Korea opened its embassy in Zagreb, the capital of Croatia, establishing a permanent diplomatic mission. Through this embassy, South Korea manages bilateral relations with Croatia as well as diplomatic cooperation with Central Europe, Eastern Europe, and the Balkans.

Croatia opened its embassy in Seoul in 2018, institutionalizing and expanding political, economic, and cultural exchanges between the two countries. Additionally, Croatia hosts South Korean honorary consulates, which support consular services and promote people-to-people exchanges.

== Diplomatic relations ==
Croatia and South Korea maintain diplomatic cooperation through foreign minister-level meetings and high-level exchanges, and they continue to work together in international organizations and multilateral forums. In October 2023, the leaders of both countries held a summit and issued a joint statement elevating Croatia–South Korea relations to a comprehensive, future-oriented partnership. The statement emphasized strengthening cooperation in political, economic, science and technology, education, and cultural fields based on universal values such as democracy, human rights, and the rule of law.

== Economic relations ==
Trade between Croatia and South Korea is relatively limited but has shown a gradual upward trend. South Korea exports electronic products and industrial equipment to Croatia, while Croatia exports food products and certain industrial raw materials to South Korea. The two countries are exploring opportunities for cooperation in logistics, energy, and advanced technology, supported by ongoing public and private sector exchanges.

== Cultural and Human Exchanges ==
Tourism is an important aspect of relations between Croatia and South Korea. Croatia is well-known among South Korean tourists for its Adriatic coast and historic cities, and its appearance as a filming location for Korean television programs has contributed to an increase in visitors.

The two countries promote mutual cultural understanding through events, exhibitions, and performances, while university exchanges and academic cooperation are gradually expanding. Interest in Korean culture and the Korean language is also growing within Croatia.
