= Group of Eleven =

International forum

G11 Members

The Group of Eleven (G11) is a forum representing developing countries on matters of international financial policy. The group aims to ease their debt burden (government debt), narrow the income gap with rich countries and lift their people out of poverty.

== History ==
King Abdullah of Jordan first proposed the group in 2005.

=== Objective ===
The group of eleven is a forum, constituted by mostly developing countries aimed at easing their debt burden and narrowing the gap with rich countries to lift, ‘millions out of poverty’. The specific aim is to garner market access and writing off of the debt burden so that these countries can focus all their resources on generating growth and stability.

=== Creation ===
The group was created on 20 September 2006. The group comprises mostly lower-middle-income countries.

=== Members ===
The members consist of Jordan, Croatia, Ecuador, Georgia, El Salvador, Honduras, Indonesia, Morocco, Pakistan, Paraguay, and Sri Lanka.

The request is made to the G8.

== May 2007 Summit ==
On 19 May, 2007, the G11 countries came together for their second summit at the Jordanian Dead Sea Resort. During the summit, they agreed to cooperate with G8 industrialized nations to ease their debts and build prosperous economies. The G11 forum requires fiscal and monetary space to maintain momentum on progress towards laying the foundation for diversified and sustainable economic growth.

The group asked for exploring avenues for enhancing cooperation among member states to shape their future development needs and strategies as well as greater cooperation with international partners for market access, enhanced productive capacities and development of scientific and technological skills and converting debts to financing aid projects.

G11 countries need targeted assistance and support from the developed countries to accelerate growth, lift millions from poverty and hasten the delivery of the fruits of reforms and social development to larger segments of their population. The G11 group need to enter into political dialogue with the G8 countries for their support to meet development objectives, encourage investment and have greater market access.

Outstanding Debt on the developing countries places a great burden on export earnings and fiscal revenues. Moreover, tariffs imposed by the G8 and other developed countries on imports are the major hurdles in the way of improving the living standard of the peoples of the developing and under developed countries through export led growth.

== G11 proposal on debt ==
The G11 argues that it is in the interest of the G8 and others to enter into arrangement with the indebted countries and convert the debts into assistance for social development projects so that the poor masses could reap the fruits of development. This would help in reducing the gap between the rich and the poor, create more job opportunities, alleviate poverty and contribute to creating an atmosphere of goodwill, fraternity and understanding among the peoples leading to the cherished objective of prosperity, peace and stability around the globe.
