= Croatia–Denmark relations =

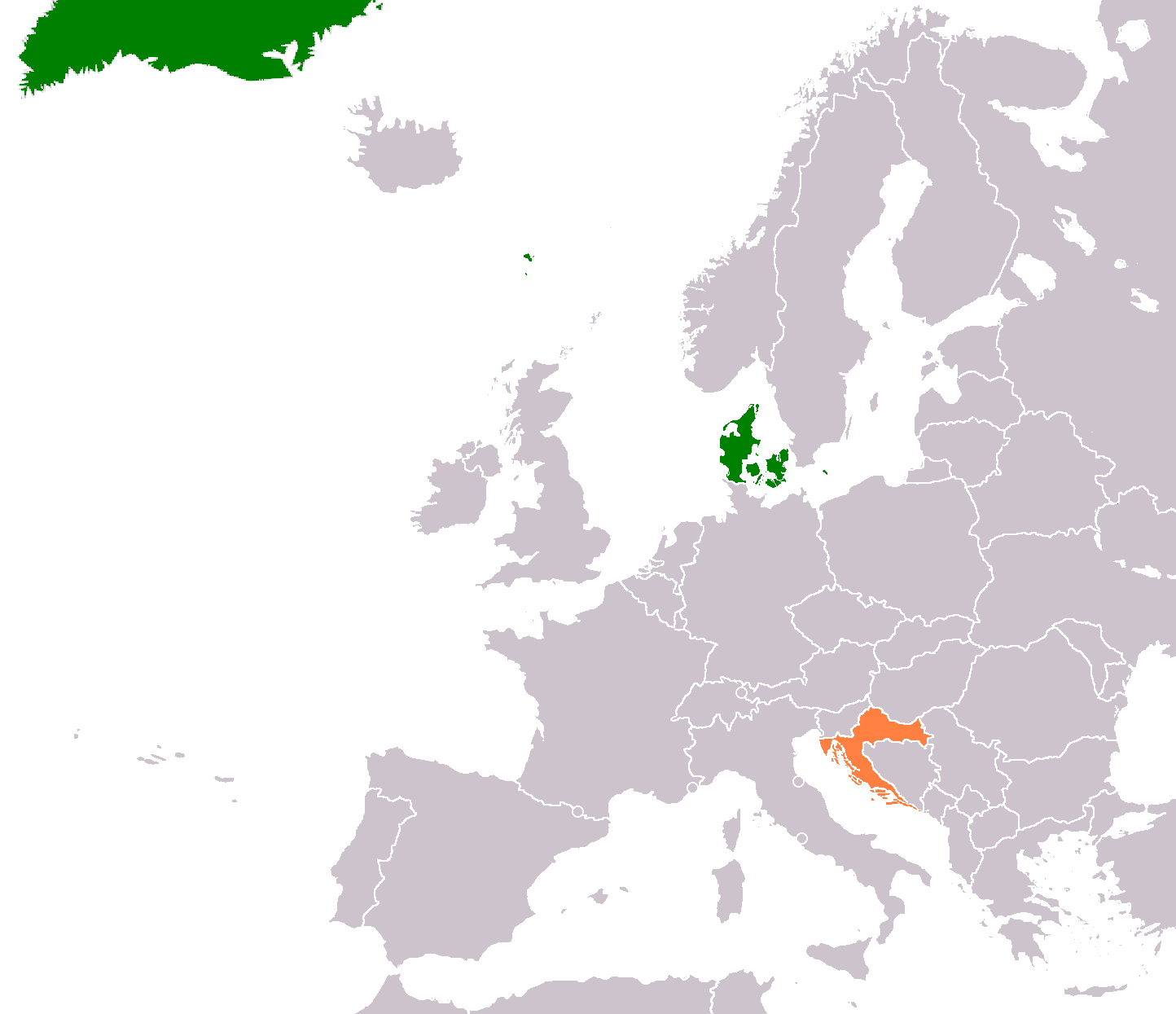

- Denmark: Croatia

Croatia–Denmark relations refers to the current and historical relations between Croatia and Denmark. Relations between the two countries are described as "excellent", "friendly" and "well-developed".

Croatia has an embassy in Copenhagen, while Denmark has an embassy in Zagreb.

Denmark actively supported Croatian accession to the European Union and NATO, with its officials stating that Croatia was the 28th EU member way before that became official in 2013. Today, both countries are full members of the European Union, NATO, OSCE, the Council of Europe and the World Trade Organization.

Following Croatian independence from SFR Yugoslavia, Denmark recognized Croatia on 15 January 1992, while the diplomatic relations were established on 2 January 1992. Since then two countries have signed 26 treaties.

In 2005, Denmark launched a program in Croatia with aim to contribute to the development of the public administration. Focus was on establishing capacity building. Denmark assisted with 13,5 million DKK.

In 2012, Croatia exported $39,6 million worth goods to Denmark and imported from it $110 million worth goods.

On October 21, 2014, Queen Margrethe II awarded Croatian president Ivo Josipović with Order of the Elephant, the highest order of Denmark.

== Resident diplomatic missions ==
- Croatia has an embassy in Copenhagen.
- Denmark has an embassy in Zagreb.
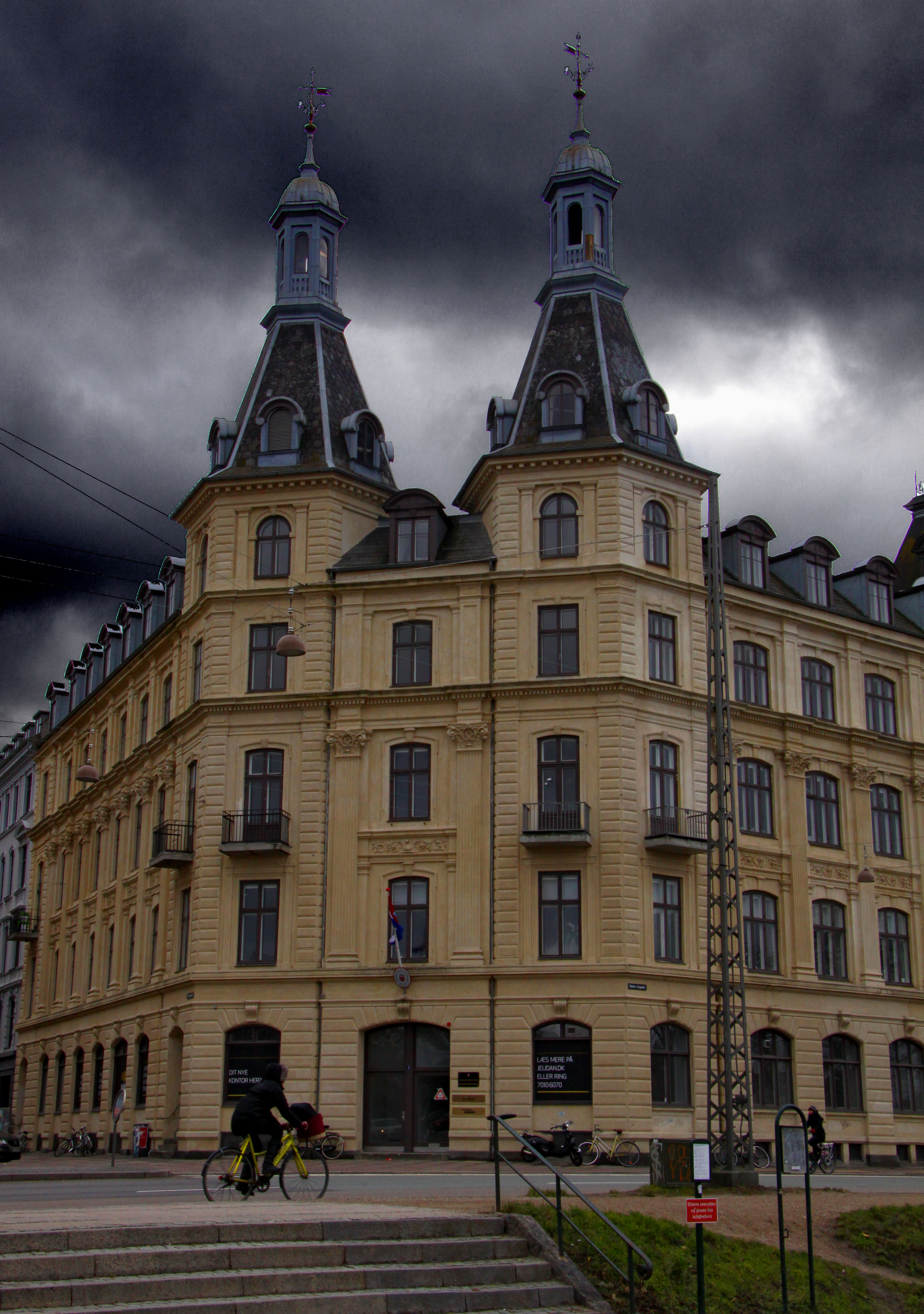
Embassy of Croatia in Copenhagen

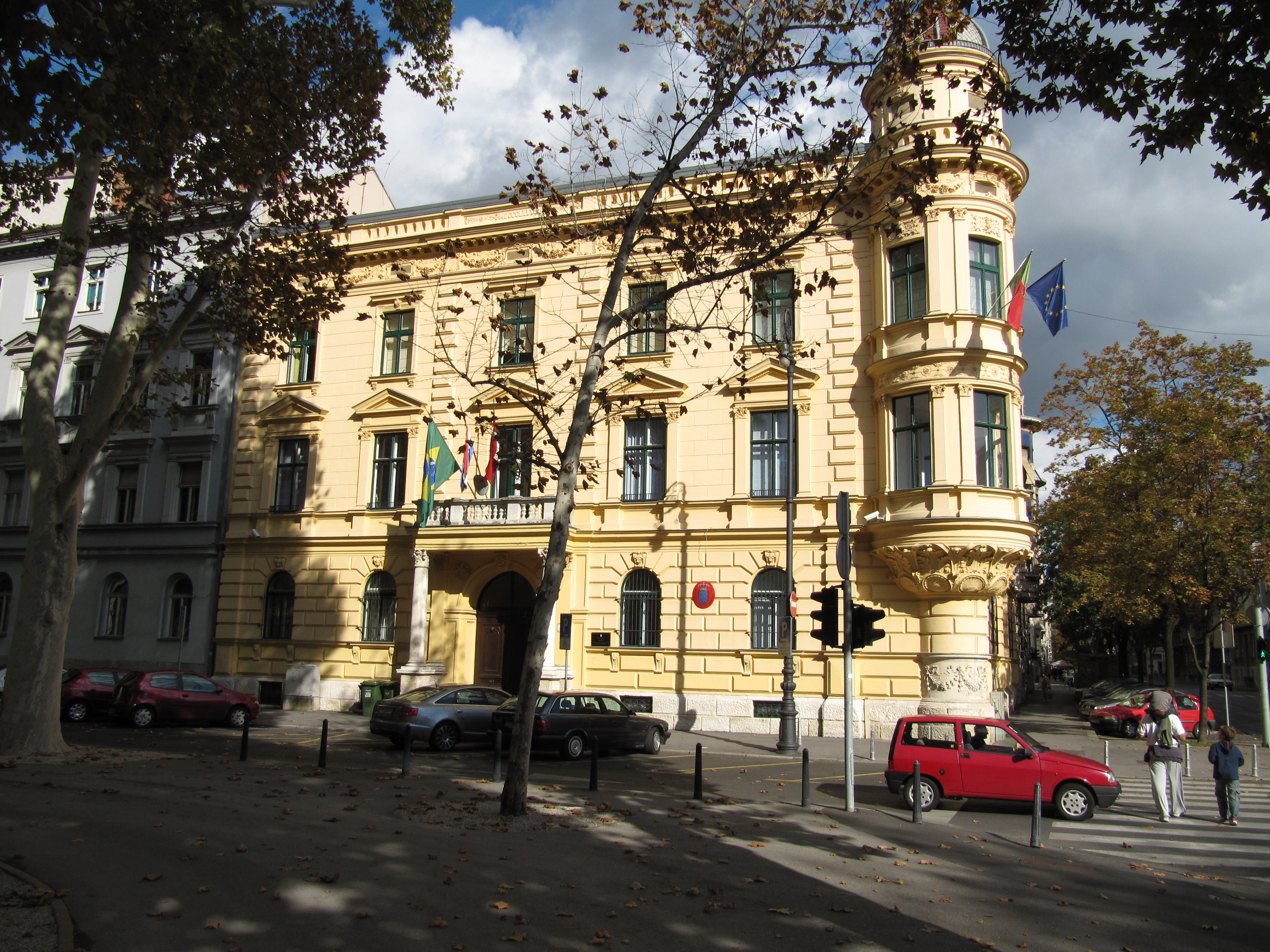
Embassy of Denmark in Zagreb

== See also ==
- Foreign relations of Croatia
- Foreign relations of Denmark
