= Croatia–Spain relations =

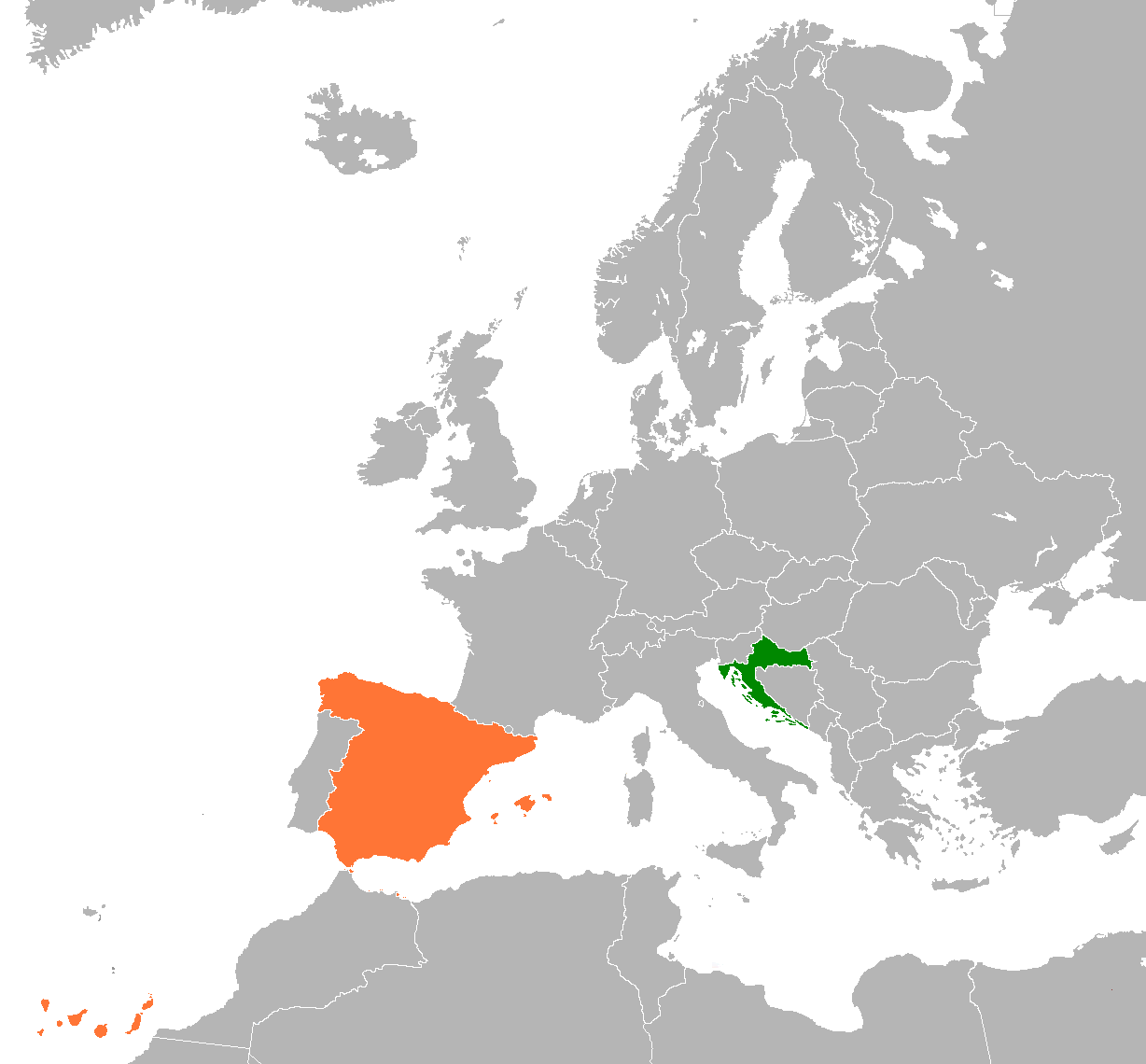

- Croatia: Spain

Croatia–Spain relations are the bilateral relations between Croatia and Spain. Diplomatic relations between the two countries were established on March 9, 1992 following Croatia's independence from SFR Yugoslavia. The two nations enjoy largely positive relations. Both countries are full members of the European Union and NATO. Spain gave full support to Croatia's applications for membership in the European Union (EU) and North Atlantic Treaty Organization (NATO).

== History ==
=== Habsburg period ===
Croatia–Spain relations date far back into history, at least as early as the 16th century. During 1516-18 Uskok War, Spanish Empire officially sided with the Kingdom of Croatia against Venice and Ottoman Empire. In January 1539, King Ferdinand deployed the army of 3000-4000 Spanish mercenaries to Croatia-Slavonia to man the fortifications in Hundred Years' Croatian–Ottoman War. In the aftermath of 1593 Battle of SIsak, Spanish king Philip II of Spain, named Croatian ban Thomas Erdődy - who commanded Croatian army in the battle - a knight of Order of San Salvador and sent him golden pearled chain with coat of arms of the Order of San Salvador.

=== During the Spanish Civil War ===
Many Croats participated in Spanish Civil War, mostly on the side of Republicans, including Josip Broz Tito who later become president of Socialist Federal Republic of Yugoslavia. The Croatian public was very sensitive about the Spanish Civil War which was well covered in the Croatian media and political arena. Youth members of the Party of Rights sent a telegram of support to Francisco Franco, a Nationalist, while League of Communists of Yugoslavia began to send volunteers to help Republicans. Party or Catholic media, such as Hrvatska straža (right wing) or Proleter (left wing), were bringing information in accordance with their ideology. While Hrvatska straža was writing daily about the persecution of religion and crimes committed by Republicans and was calling for "a joint fight against the red danger and ghosts of atheism", Proleter was writing about crimes committed by Nationalists and was calling for "an international fight against the scourge of fascism" and was denouncing the church as co-responsible for crimes. The left wing press was constantly emphasizing the importance of fighting for the national rights of Catalans, Basques and others, comparing it with bad status of Croats in the Kingdom of Yugoslavia, while the right wing (Ustaše) press, while fighting against Serbian unitarianism within the Kingdom of Yugoslavia, hadn't paid much attention to aspirations of Catalans and Basques in Spain. The Catholic Church was constantly emphasizing the anti-religious and anti-clerical character of Republicans, depicting Franco as protector of the faith, Church, and the Christian tradition.

=== Post–WWII ===
After the Second World War and the destruction of the Nazi puppet state, called the Independent State of Croatia, Spain, led by Francisco Franco, accepted a lot of those who fled from the liberated territory, and newly founded Socialist Federal Republic of Yugoslavia, including dictator Ante Pavelić and his family. Spain was also one of the only countries who accepted Croatian students who were fighting in Ustashas.

=== Present status ===
Spain provided strong support to the Croatian accession to the EU. On July 1, 2013, Spain welcomed Croatian EU accession by hanging festive red cravat, invented by Croats, on the Cibeles Palace.

In March 2022, Andrej Plenković visited Spain in what it was the first official visit by a Croatian prime minister in 25 years. The respective science ministers from both countries signed a joint declaration announcing the Croatian support to the 'International Fusion Materials Irradiation Facility - Demo Oriented Neutron Source', a project intended to be built in Granada.

== Economic cooperation ==
In 2013, Croatia exported €40,800,000 worth of goods to Spain and imported from it €234,300,000 worth of goods. Recently, the air connectivity between the two countries has increased significantly. Spain - particularly coastal destinations such as Lloret de Mar and the Costa Brava region - has traditionally been one of the most popular and frequent destinations for senior high school graduation trips (Croatian: maturalno putovanje or maturalac) among Croatian students.

== High level visits ==
=== Croatian officials main visits to Spain ===
- June 28, 1994, Mate Granić foreign minister
- July 21, 1997, Zlatko Mateša Prime Minister.
- October 10, 2000, Stjepan Mesić President of Croatia
- March 1, 2001, Tonino Picula foreign minister
- October 25, 2001, Ivica Račan Prime Minister
- June 9, 2004, Miomir Žužul foreign minister
- March 8, 2005, Stjepan Mesić President of Croatia

=== Spanish officials main visits to Croatia ===
- February 2, 1994, Javier Solana Minister of Foreign Affairs
- August 16, 1995 Javier Solana Minister of Foreign Affairs
- February 12, 1996, Carlos Westendorp Minister of Foreign Affairs
- November 11, 2000, Josep Piqué Minister of Foreign Affairs
- November 24, 2000, José María Aznar Prime Minister
- May 19, 2005, Miguel Ángel Moratinos Minister of Foreign Affairs

== Resident diplomatic missions ==
- Croatia has an embassy in Madrid.
- Spain has an embassy in Zagreb.
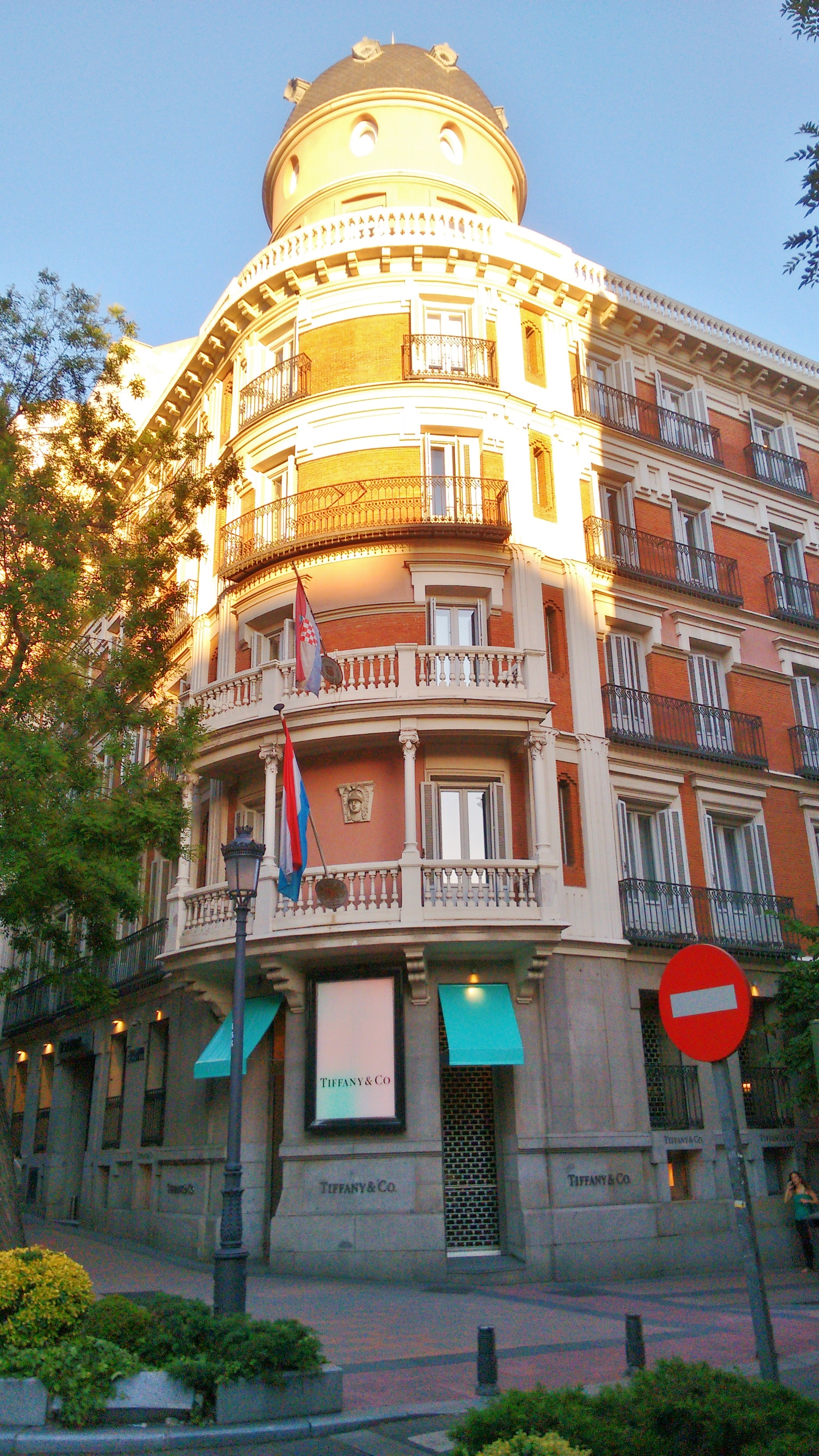
Embassy of Croatia in Madrid

== See also ==
- Foreign relations of Croatia
- Foreign relations of Spain
- Spain–Yugoslavia relations
