= Finland–NATO relations =

- NATO: Finland

European membership of the EU and NATO in March 2024 EU member only NATO member only member of both

Finland has been a member of the North Atlantic Treaty Organization (NATO) since 4 April 2023. In the aftermath of World War II, following the formation of NATO in 1949 and throughout the Cold War, Finland maintained a position of neutrality, in what became known as Finlandization, in the face of its often complicated relations with the Soviet Union.

The possibility of membership became a topic of debate in the country after the end of the Cold War and following the country's accession to NATO's Partnership for Peace (PfP) programme and the European Union (EU) in the mid-1990s. In spite of these new bonds to Europe and the West, public support for NATO accession remained low.

The 2022 Russian invasion of Ukraine marked a turning point in the debate, and swung public opinion in favour of NATO membership. Along with neighboring Sweden, the country applied to join NATO on 18 May 2022. Following ratification, Finland became a member of NATO on 4 April 2023. Finland has a 1,340-kilometre (830 mi) border with Russia, which upon accession more than doubled NATO's pre-existing border with Russia.

== History ==
=== Background: Finnish neutrality at the end of World War II ===
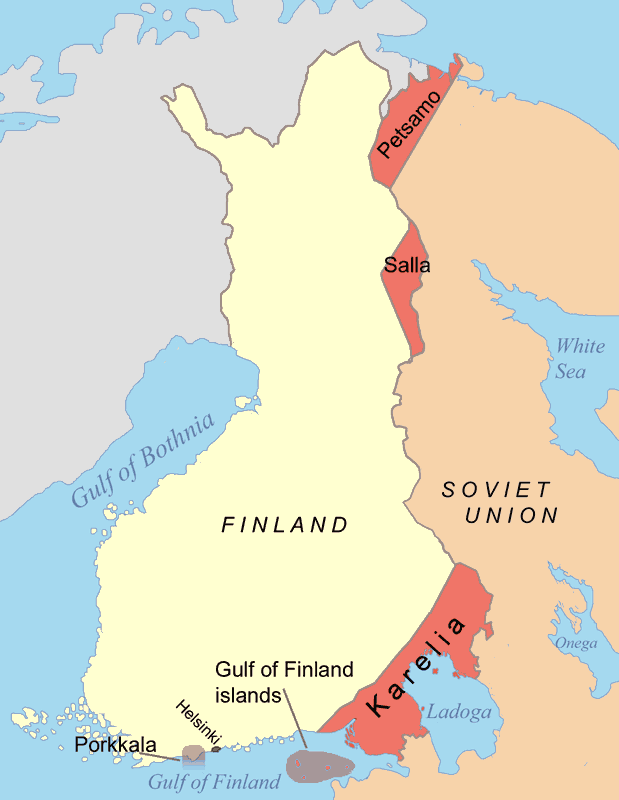
Areas ceded by Finland to the Soviet Union following the Moscow Armistice displayed in red

At the end of World War II, Finland had to cut its ties with Germany, with which it had allied against the Soviet Union in the Continuation War. Following the war, foreign policy was guided by the Paasikivi–Kekkonen doctrine, which aimed to ensure Finland's survival as an independent sovereign, democratic, and capitalist state next to the Communist Soviet Union. This was to be achieved by maintaining good enough relations with the Soviet Union to avoid war with its eastern neighbor. The Finnish government refused foreign aid from the United States under the Marshall Plan due to Soviet pressure. Shortly afterward, the YYA Treaty was concluded between Finland and the Soviet Union.

=== 1949–2023: Pre-membership relations ===
==== 1949–1991: Finnish neutrality during the Cold War ====
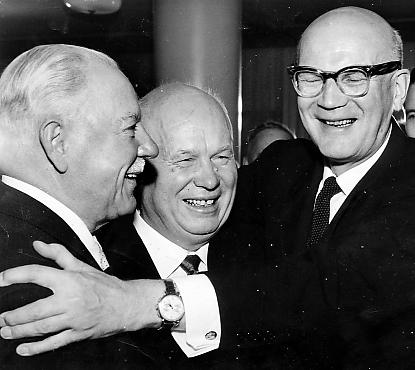
Chairman of the Presidium of the Supreme Soviet, Marshal Kliment Voroshilov, General Secretary of the Central Committee of the CPSU Nikita Khrushchev, and President of Finland Urho Kekkonen meeting in Moscow in November 1960.

NATO was founded in 1949. As opposed to neighbouring Norway, Finland chose not to join. The Cold War was marked by Finlandization, in which Finland retained its nominal independence and control over its internal affairs, while the conduct of foreign policy during this period was always more or less limited by the need to avoid conflict with the Soviet regime and its foreign policy. As a result, Finland took neutral stances to stay out of great power conflicts, and refrained from joining NATO, the European Communities, or other institutions which were established following the war by the Western democratic states, as well as the Soviet-led Warsaw Pact. During the peak of the Cold War, the Finnish government made a conscious effort to increase defence capabilities to ensure a strong deterrent for any potential invasion. From 1968 onward, the Finnish government adopted the doctrine of territorial defence, which requires the use of large land areas to delay and wear out a potential aggressor. This was complemented by the concept of total defence, which calls for the use of all resources of society for national defence in times of crisis.

==== 1991–1995: Immediate aftermath of the Cold War ====
Following the dissolution of the Soviet Union between 1988 and 1991, the threat posed to Finland's independence was diminished. NATO emphasized its open door policy to admitting new members, and many former Eastern Bloc and post-Soviet states joined the alliance in the 1990s and 2000s. Through subsequent governments the Finnish position was that joining NATO was unnecessary, and it was preferable to retain an independent defence policy, though if conditions changed the country had the right to exercise the option to join NATO. Removing barriers to effectively exercising the option to join an alliance (for example, by increasing interoperability) is a part of this policy. Finland joined NATO's Partnership for Peace in 1994.

==== 1995–2022: Shift from non-alignment within the European Union ====
Accession of Finland to the European Union in 1995

The country did move away from neutrality during this period though, joining the European Union in 1995 which required adopting its Common Foreign and Security Policy.

Finland became a member of the European Union in 1995. Since the entry into force of the Treaty of Lisbon in 2009, the EU mutual solidarity clause applies to Finland along with other EU member states:

If a Member State is the victim of armed aggression on its territory, the other Member States shall have towards it an obligation of aid and assistance by all the means in their power, in accordance with Article 51 of the United Nations Charter. This shall not prejudice the specific character of the security and defence policy of certain Member States. [...]

— Article 42.7 of the consolidated version of the Treaty on European Union

Article 42.2 specifies that NATO shall be the main forum for the implementation of collective self-defence for EU member states that are also NATO members. The other EU member states that are outside NATO and consequently resort to the EU's Common Security and Defence Policy (CSDP, which has a much smaller structures and capabilities than NATO's command structure) for the implementation of collective self-defence, are Austria, Cyprus, Ireland and Malta.

The possibility of Finland's membership in NATO was one of the most important issues debated in relation to the Finnish presidential election of 2006. The main opposition candidate Sauli Niinistö, of the National Coalition Party, supported Finland joining a "more European" NATO. Fellow right-winger Henrik Lax of the Swedish People's Party likewise supported the concept. On the other side, president Tarja Halonen of the Social Democratic Party opposed changing the status quo, as did most other candidates in the election. Her victory and re-election to the post of president put the issue of a NATO membership for Finland on hold for the duration of her term.

In 2007, Finland made various technical preparations of the Finnish Defence Forces for membership, with the then Defence Minister Jyri Häkämies eager to pursue NATO membership. The government preferred to wait until after the negotiations of the new EU treaty were concluded before reviewing their policy on NATO, to determine if it included a new EU-level defence agreement.

Finnish think tank EVA, which has regularly commissioned opinion polls on NATO membership, noted in its 2015 report a downward trend in the percent opposed that started in 1998, including a steep decline after the 2012 presidential election. In March 2014, during Russia's annexation of Crimea, one survey showed only 22 percent supported membership, though a second showed that 53 percent would support membership if Finnish leadership recommended it. Support for a military alliance with neighbor Sweden was also high, at 54 percent, and Finland could possibly seek an enlarged role for NORDEFCO. Finnish Minister of Defence Carl Haglund suggested that a referendum on NATO membership could be held sometime after the 2015 parliamentary election.

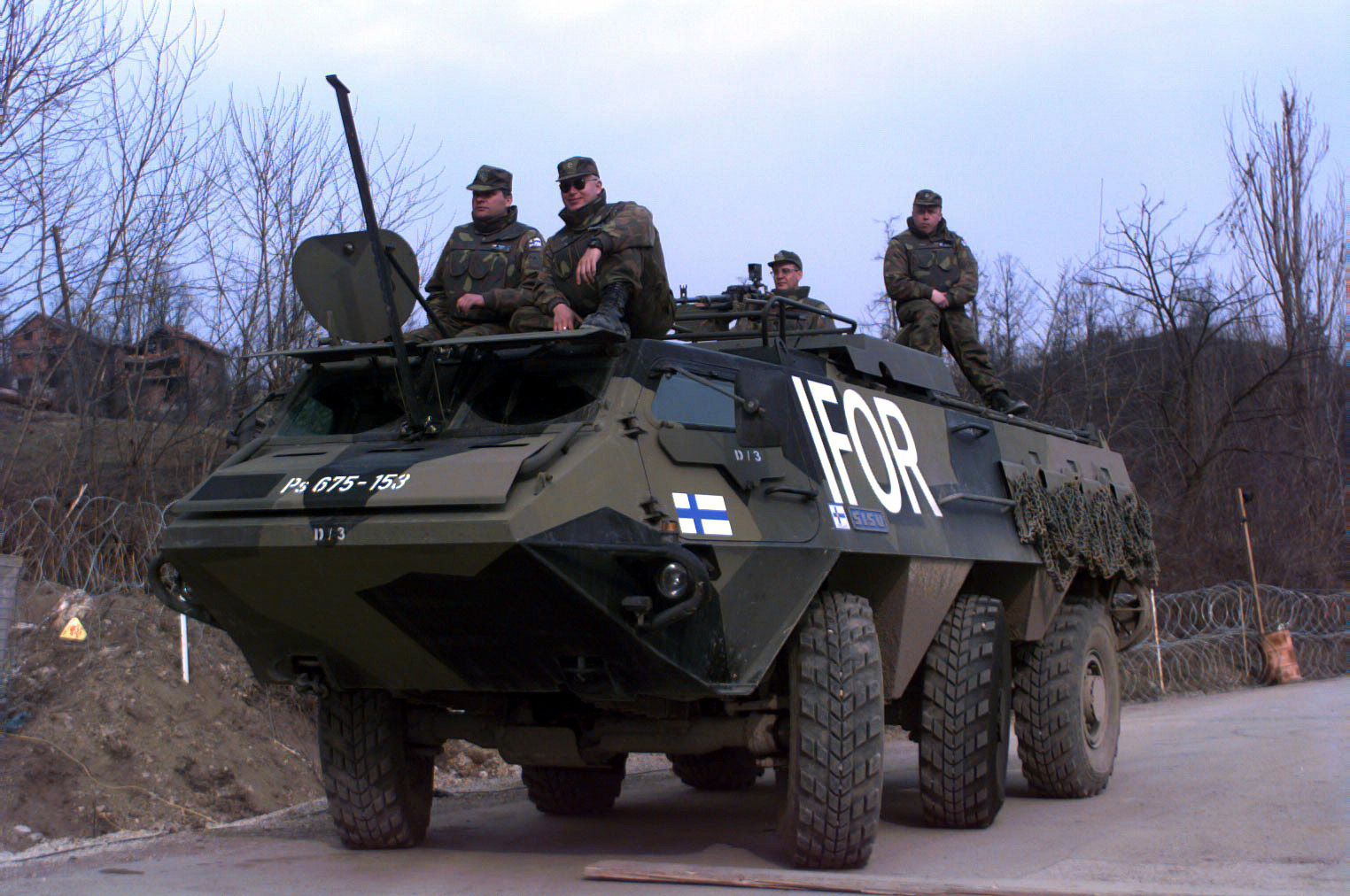
Finnish IFOR forces on a Sisu XA-180 in 1996

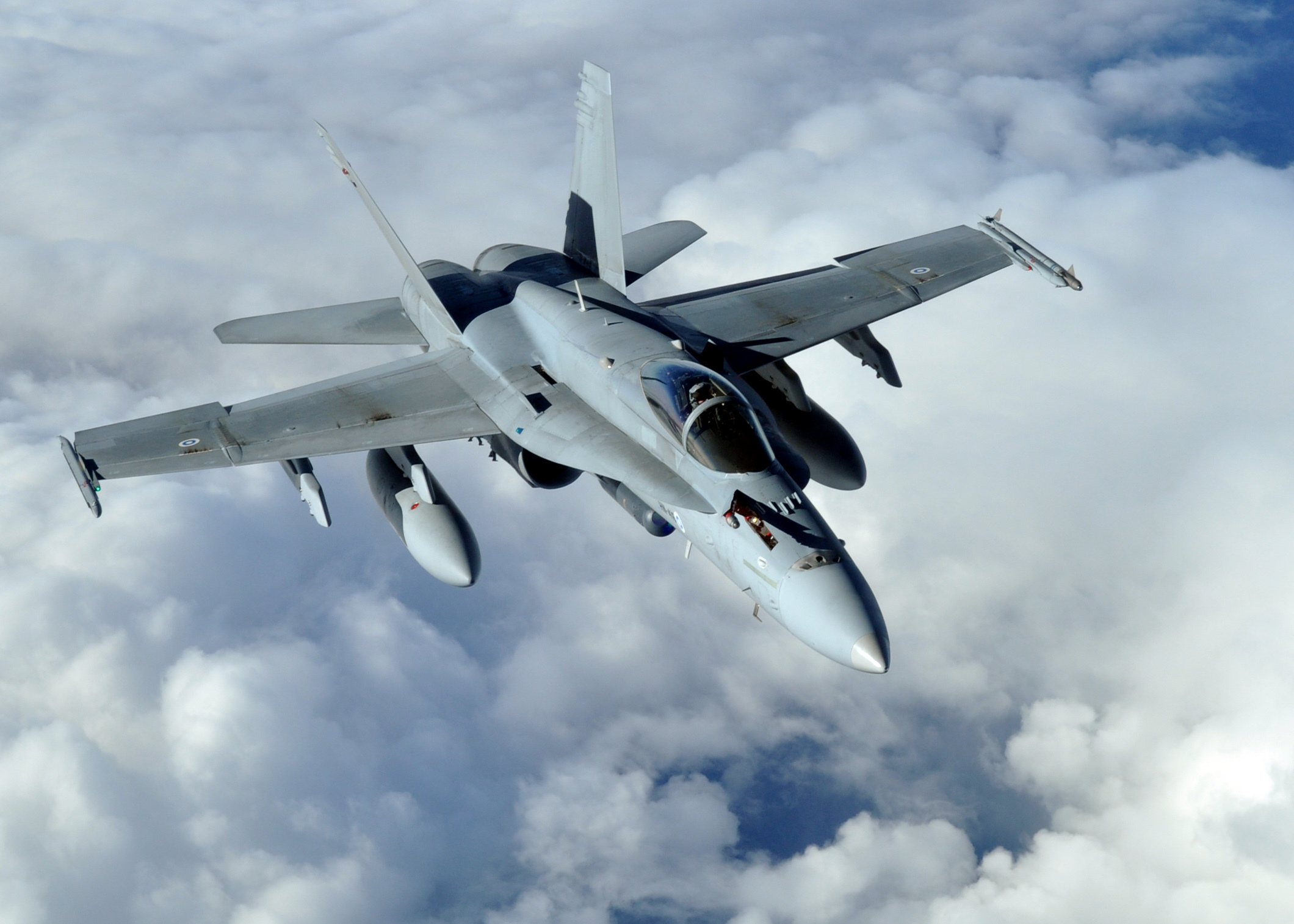
A Finnish Air Force F/A-18 Hornet, which is slated to be replaced by the F-35 Lightning II beginning in 2026

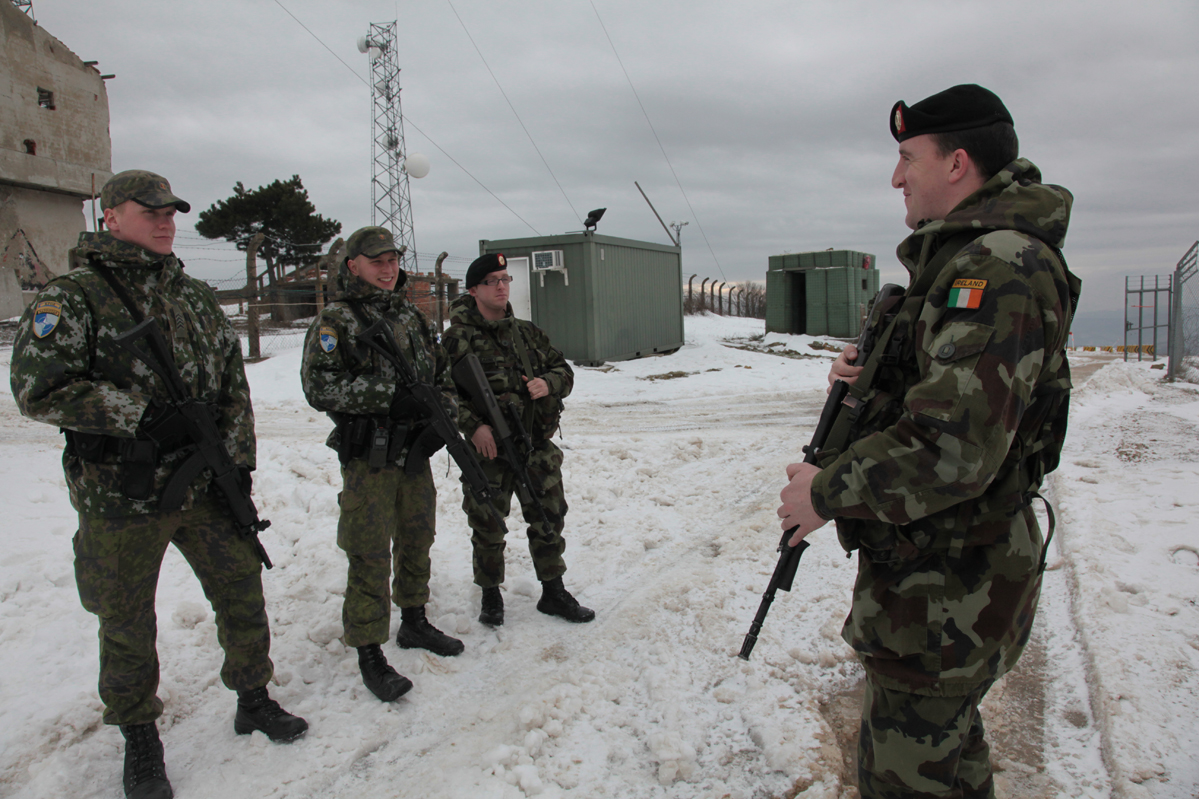
Finland has sent peacekeepers to Kosovo as part of the NATO-led Kosovo Force. In this image, two Finnish soldiers are receiving a briefing from an Irish soldier.

Before joining NATO, Finland participated in nearly all sub-areas of the Partnership for Peace programme, and provided peacekeeping forces to both the Afghanistan and Kosovo missions. The Finnish government's 1997 defense white paper strongly advocated the development of interoperability to support international crisis management in line with the PfP concept. The 1998–2008 defense program began in May 1997 at the "Spirit of PfP" training in northern Norway. Finland maintained close relations with NATO and purchased from its members military equipment including F-35 Lightning II aircraft. Newly procured equipment was required to meet NATO standards since before Finland seriously pursued membership. Despite "longstanding armaments cooperation with NATO," upon accession it still retained non-compatible materiel, such as the RK 62 assault rifle, that would not be decommissioned until the end of its lifecycle.

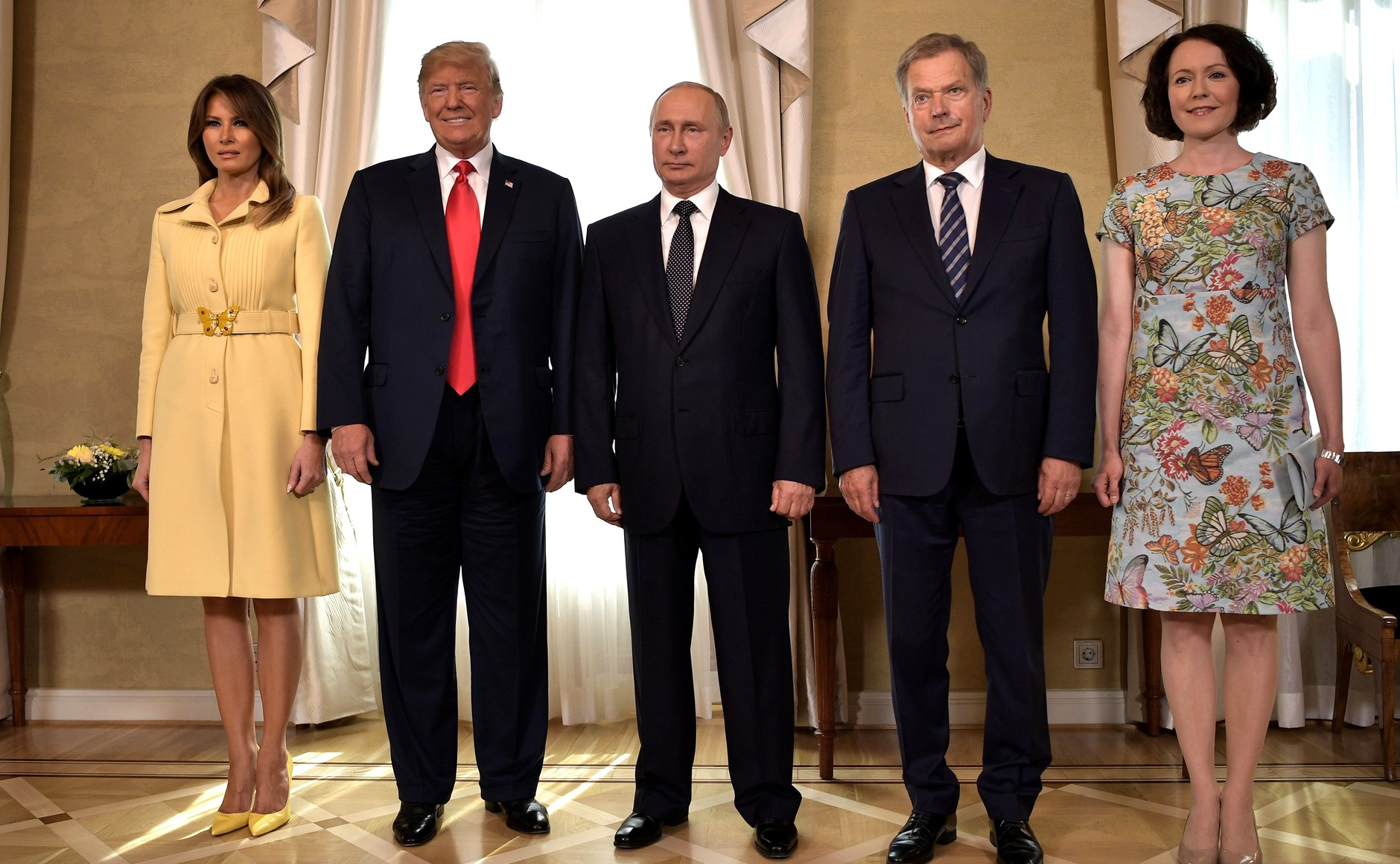
US President Donald Trump with Russian President Vladimir Putin, Finnish President Sauli Niinistö, First Lady of the United States Melania Trump, and First Lady of Finland Jenni Haukio, 2018 Russia–United States Summit in Helsinki, Finland 16 July 2018

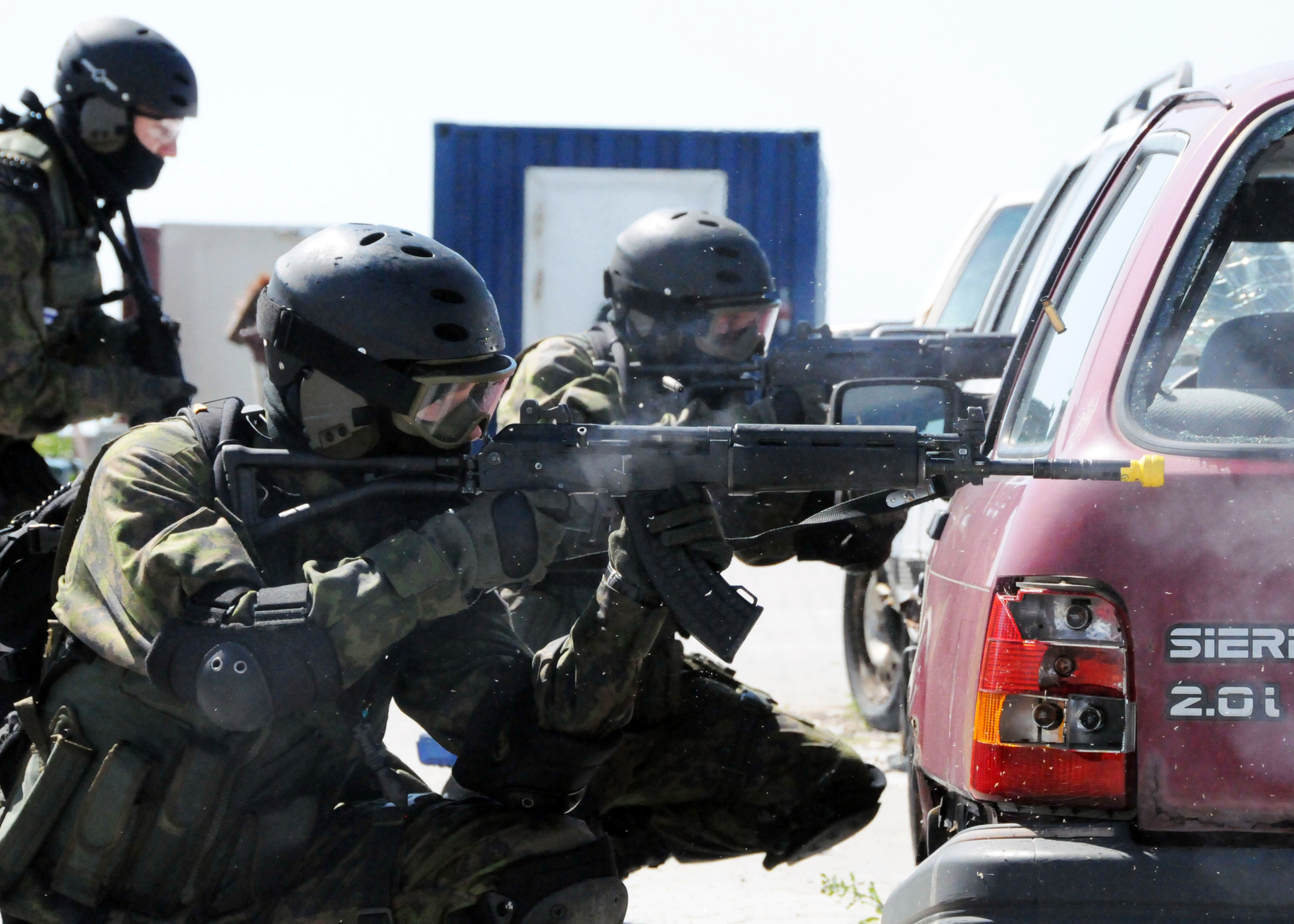
Finland has participated in the US-led BALTOPS exercises along with many NATO countries and other Partners for Peace; shown here are Finnish soldiers taking part in BALTOPS 2009 in Sweden.

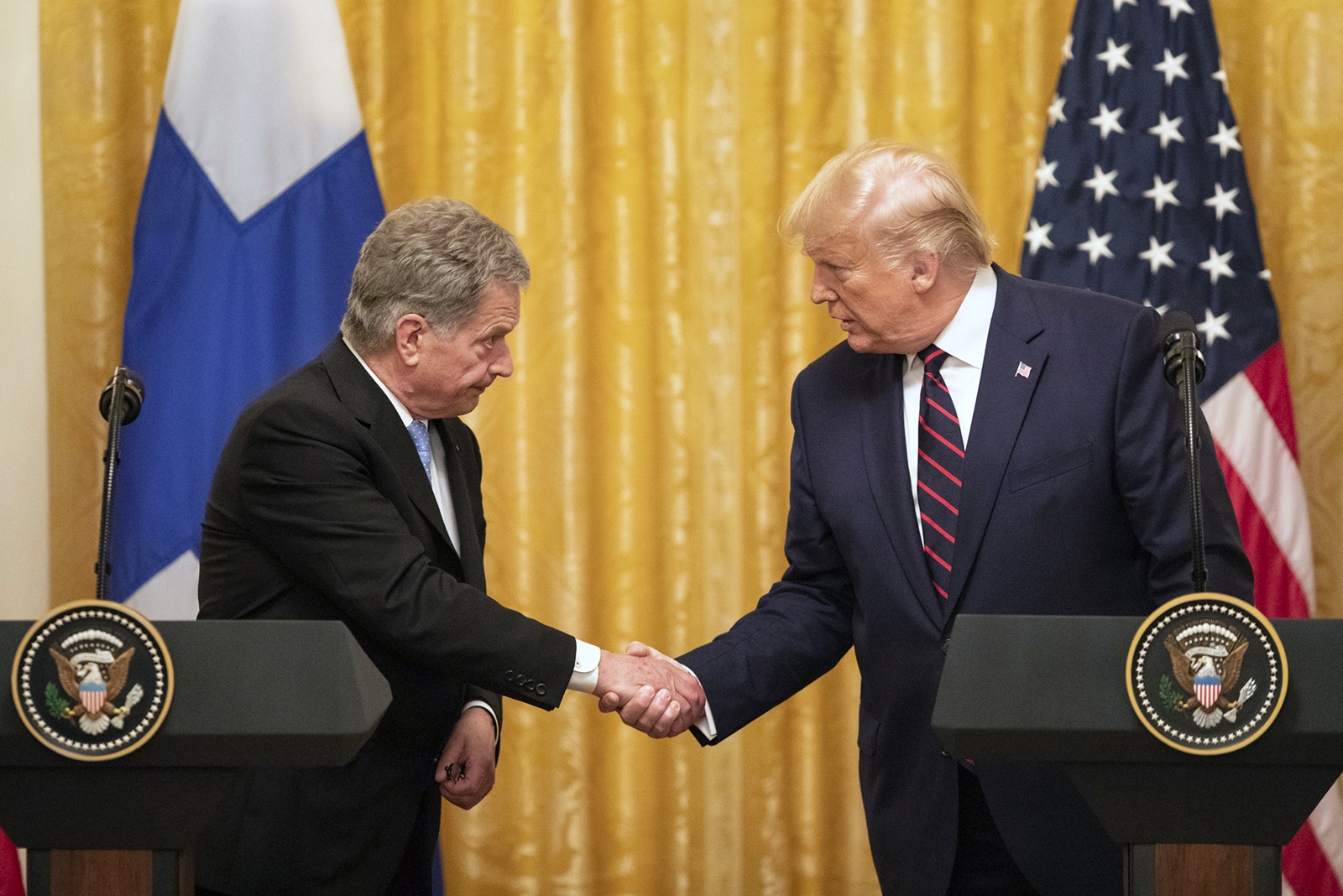
Finnish President Sauli Niinistö with US President Donald Trump in Washington, D.C., United States on 2 October 2019

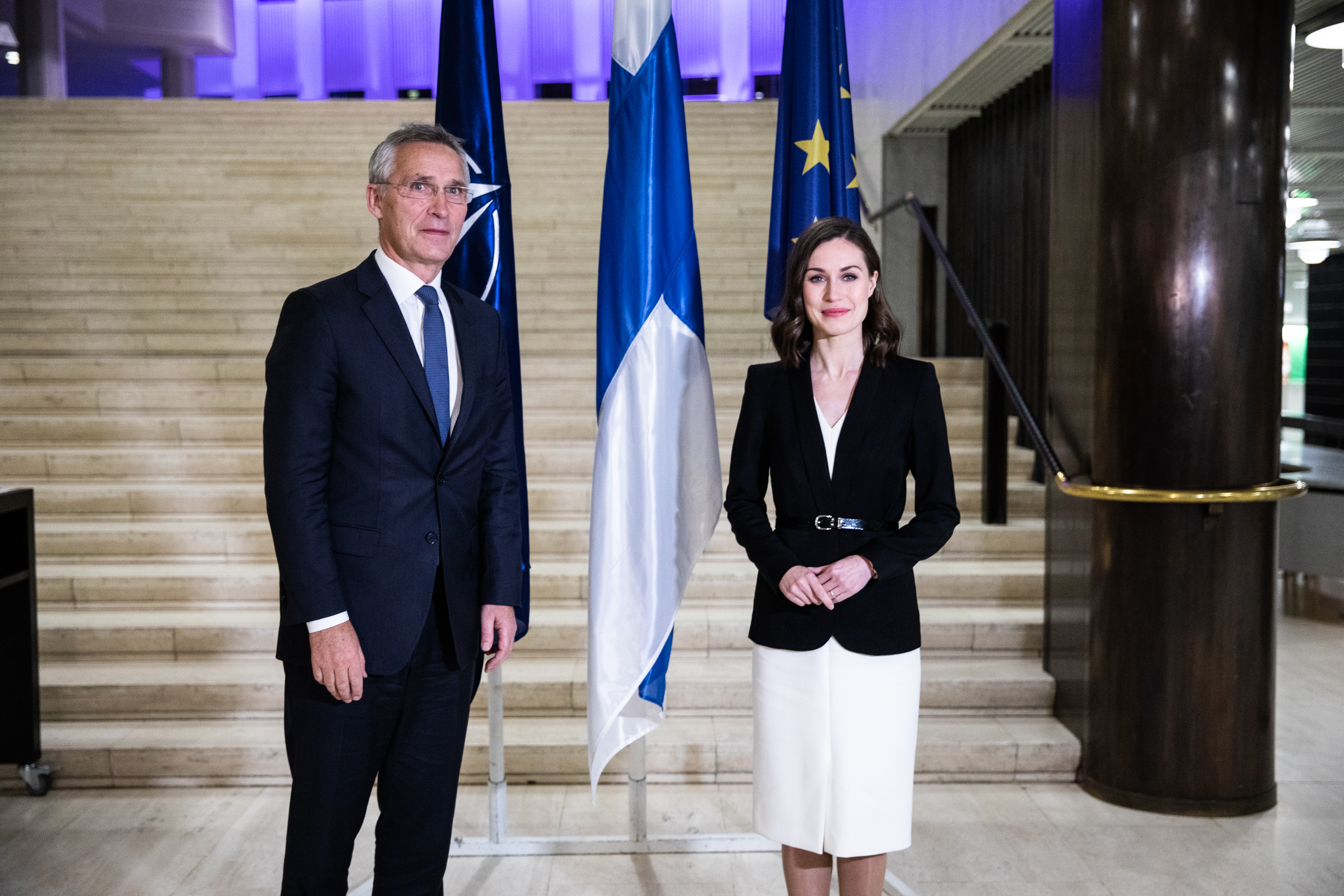
NATO Secretary General Jens Stoltenberg with Finnish Prime Minister Sanna Marin in Helsinki, Finland on 25 October 2021

In April 2014, while Carl Haglund was Defence Minister, the government announced that it was negotiating a memorandum of understanding with NATO on Finland's readiness to receive military assistance and to aid NATO in equipment maintenance. He emphasized that this memorandum was not a step toward membership. The agreement, signed in September 2014, allows NATO and Finland to hold joint exercises on Finnish soil and permits assistance from NATO members in situations such as "disasters, disruptions, and threats to security". As such, Finland (and Sweden) participated in the 2015 NATO-led Arctic Challenge Exercise.

In January 2022, Prime Minister Sanna Marin said that Finland reserved the option of applying NATO membership if it chooses to do so, but she said it was "very unlikely" it would happen during her term as prime minister.

==== 2022–2023: Accession process following the Russian invasion of Ukraine ====
===== February–May 2022: Initial response to the invasion =====
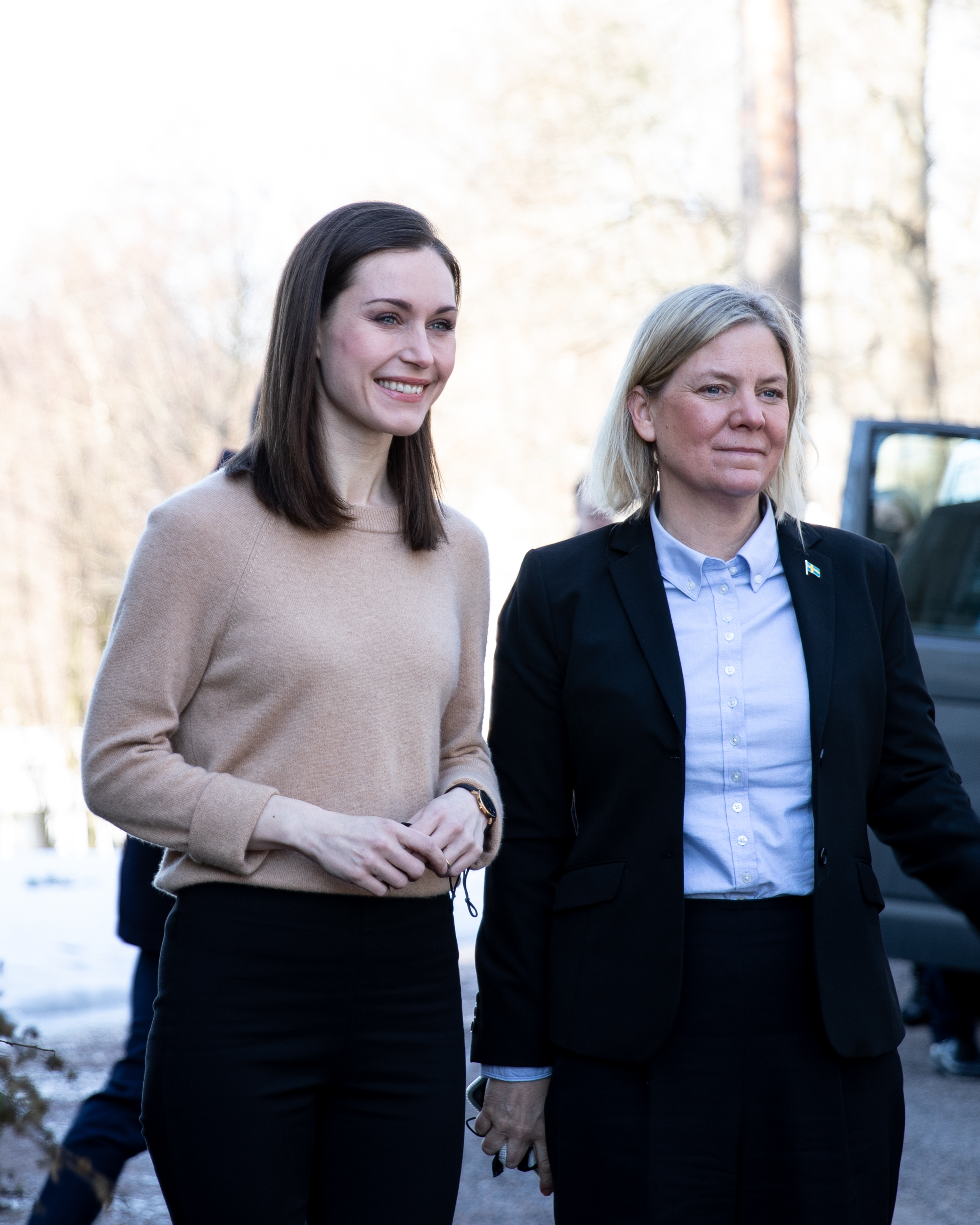
Finnish Prime Minister Sanna Marin with Swedish Prime Minister Magdalena Andersson in Helsinki, Finland on 5 March 2022

On 24 February 2022, in response to the Russian invasion of Ukraine, the prime minister reiterated that while Finland was "not currently facing an immediate military threat", joining NATO was still a possibility, noting that "the debate on NATO membership in Finland will change". On 25 February, a Russian Foreign Ministry spokesperson threatened Finland and Sweden with "military and political consequences" if they attempted to join NATO. Both countries had attended the emergency NATO summit as members of NATO's Partnership for Peace and both had condemned the invasion and had provided assistance to Ukraine. Following a meeting on 1 March 2022 to discuss whether to apply to become full members of NATO, Prime Minister Sanna Marin stated that no decision had been made on the issue yet, saying that "such an important question needs to be dealt with thoroughly". According to news reports from early March 2022, Finland and Sweden had begun plans to apply for Major non-NATO ally status with the United States.

Opinion polling following the invasion showed an unprecedented increase in support for joining NATO among Finns, with a clear majority in favour. Several citizens' initiatives on the subject got the required 50,000 signatures, requiring the Parliament of Finland to consider the matter. President Niinistö characterised the polling as demonstrating sufficient popular support for an application. Prime Minister Marin suggested that the decision process must be concluded in the spring and in a matter of "weeks, not months".

On 13 April 2022, the Ministry for Foreign Affairs produced a report on the international security landscape and on the foreign and defence policy options available to Finland, which is expected to form the basis of the debate on NATO membership. The report identifies that the Russian invasion has changed the long-term European security environment and made it more difficult to predict and act in the near term. It does not explicitly take a position on NATO membership, but does state that the present security arrangements are insufficient and that membership would increase stability, although there is no immediate threat. As a member, Finland would not be obliged to accept foreign bases or the presence of nuclear weapons on its territory; Finland's defence budget would rise by 1 to 1.5%. Helsingin Sanomat assessed it as a positive evaluation of NATO membership.

Prior to the Russian invasion of Ukraine, the National Coalition Party and Swedish People's Party of Finland supported NATO membership, and the other parties were neutral or opposed to varying degrees. In 2016, the party conference of the National Coalition Party agreed that Finland should apply for membership "in the next few years". In the vision of the Swedish People's Party of Finland set out in the same year, Finland will be a NATO member in 2025. Many individual politicians have advocated for NATO as well, including the former President Sauli Niinistö and current President Alexander Stubb, as well as former President Martti Ahtisaari, who has argued that Finland should join all the organizations supported by other Western democracies in order "to shrug off once and for all the burden of Finlandization". Two other former presidents from the Social Democratic Party, Tarja Halonen and Mauno Koivisto, have publicly opposed the idea, arguing that NATO membership would deteriorate Finland's relations with Russia. The Left Alliance has been the party most opposed to joining NATO; when they entered into coalition with the SDP in 2019, they made clear that any movement toward a military alliance would lead to the Left Alliance leaving the cabinet. The party's position changed following the invasion, with chair Li Andersson calling for a thoughtful, society-wide discussion and evaluation of the possibility of applying to join NATO, and later confirming that the party had decided not to resign from the government if an application is submitted. After the invasion and a large change in popular opinion, the leadership of the Center Party and Finns Party also changed position to support NATO membership.

NATO has consistently maintained its "open door policy". Secretary General Jens Stoltenberg expected that the member states would "warmly welcome Finland as a member of NATO". He also said that this decision to invite Finland into NATO would offer it political protection during the ratification process. He has said that "Finnish membership would make NATO stronger", identifying the country's military capability and commitment to remaining a democratic society as assets.

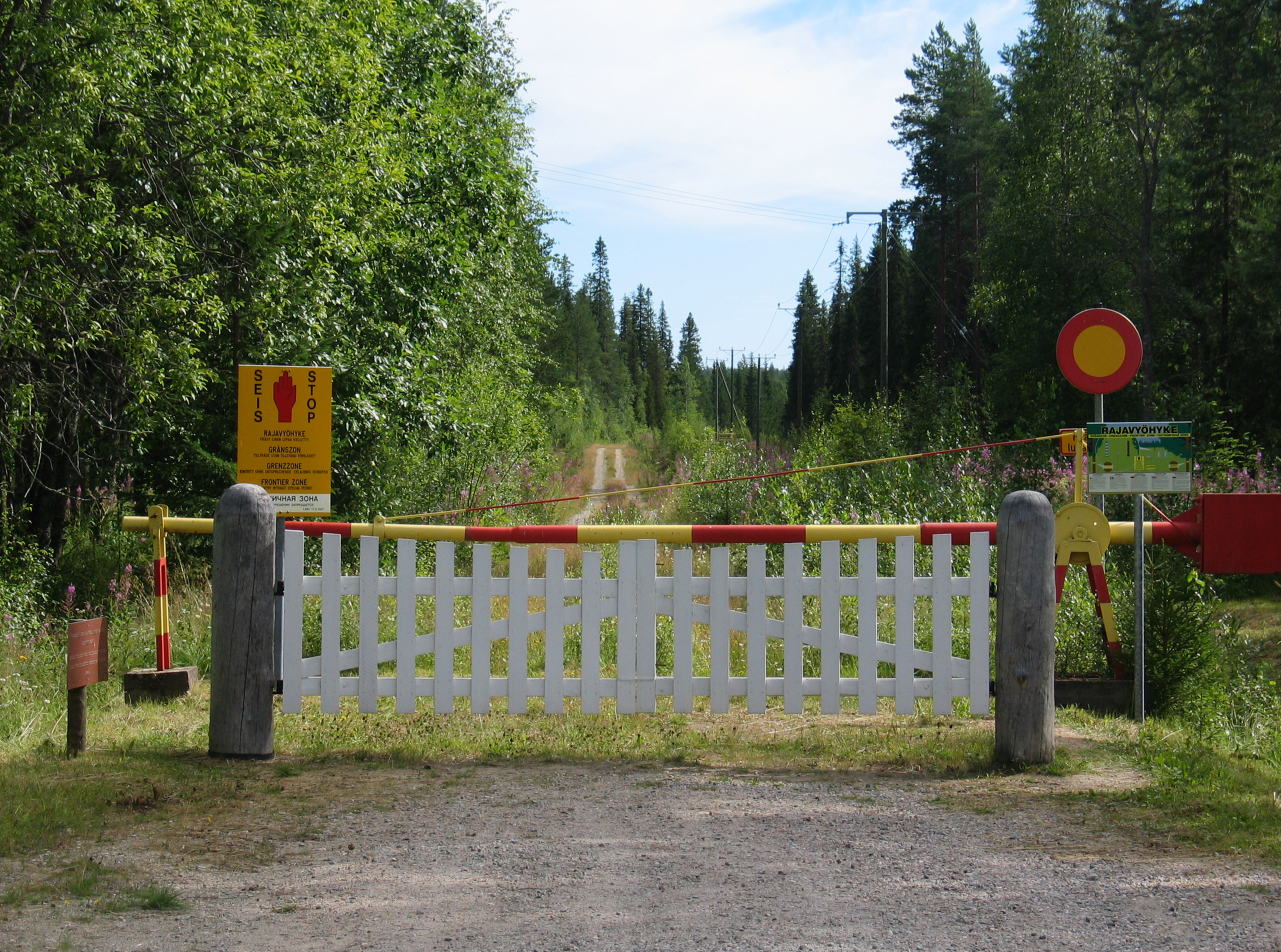
The border between Finland and Russia is about 1,340 km (833 mi) long.

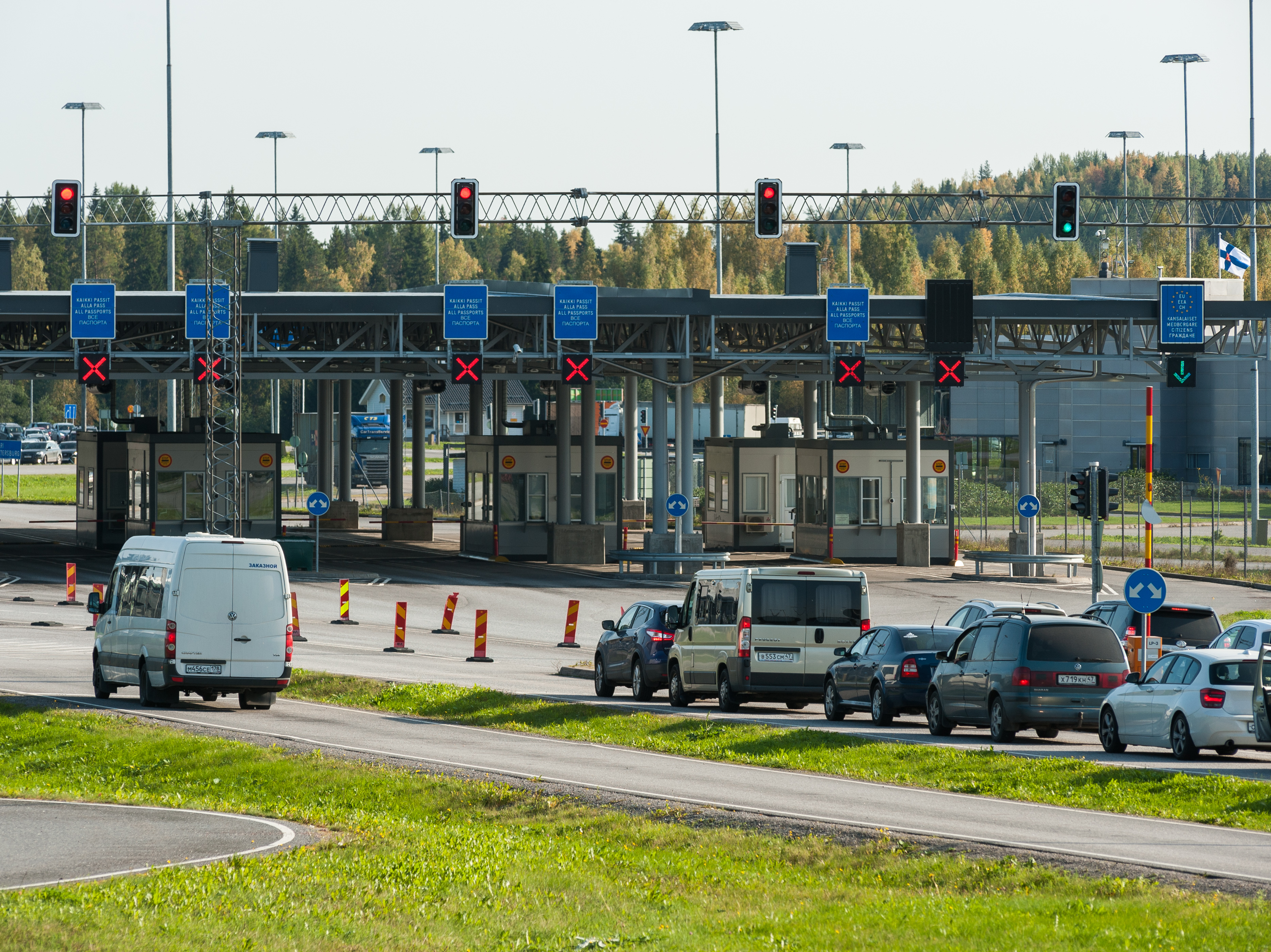
The car traffic on the Finnish side at the Nuijamaa Border Crossing Point in Nuijamaa, Lappeenranta, South Karelia, in September 2017

Finland has received critical feedback from Russia for considering the possibility of joining NATO, with a 2009 study suggesting this could have repercussions for Russia's relations with the EU and NATO as a whole. Following the 2008 Russo-Georgian War, Finnish Prime Minister Matti Vanhanen reiterated that Finland had no plans to join NATO, and stated that the main lesson of the war was the need for closer ties to Russia. In a June 2014 interview in the Finnish newspaper Hufvudstadsbladet, Vladimir Putin's personal envoy Sergey Alexandrovich Markov accused Finland of extreme "Russophobia" and suggested that Finland joining NATO could start World War III. In July 2016, Putin stated on a visit to Finland that Russia would increase the number of troops on the Finnish border if Finland were to join NATO. He also warned that NATO would "fight to the last Finn against Russia".

After the 2022 Russian invasion of Ukraine and the radical shift in Finnish positions toward joining NATO, Maria Zakharova and Dmitry Medvedev warned that joining NATO would have consequences for Finland, including the deployment of nuclear weapons; Russian newspaper Izvestia reported that the Finnish lease on the Saimaa canal may be terminated.

According to Hanna Smith, Director of Research at the European Centre of Excellence for Countering Hybrid Threats, the rapidity of Finnish movement into NATO has surprised Russia. She predicted that Russia will begin a hybrid campaign to influence the Finnish decision process, including cyber attacks, with increasing escalation if Finland moves closer to membership.

Russia has halted providing natural gas to neighbouring Finland after the Nordic country refused to pay supplier Gazprom in rubles. Russia's leading exporter of electricity to the Nordic market, RAO Nordic, has announced that it has decided to cut electricity supplies to Finland due to payment arrears.

Polls asking the Finnish public whether they support or oppose joining NATO have been regularly conducted. This table includes only unconditional questions; other polled topics include support for joining NATO should Sweden also join, and support for joining NATO if the Finnish government officially recommends membership, both of which generally increased public support for joining.

According to Helsingin Sanomat's data between 20 and 26 June 2022, 70% said Finland would not meet Turkey's demands, and 14% that it would. According to Ilta-Sanomat's data, between 30 January and 1 February 2023, 53% of Finnish respondents said they wanted to join NATO without waiting for Sweden to join, 28% said they wanted to wait to join NATO with Sweden, and 19% were undecided.

Polls on Finnish membership of NATO
Dates conducted	Pollster	Client	Sample size	Support	Oppose	Neutral or DK	Lead
16–28 Oct 1998	Taloustutkimus	Verkkouutiset	1036	32%	48%	10%	16%
15 Oct – 2 Nov 1999	Taloustutkimus	Verkkouutiset	1013	16%	73%	12%	57%
21 Nov 2000 – 18 Jan 2001	Yhdyskuntatutkimus	EVA	2214	20%	52%	28%	32%
3 Dec 2002 – 29 Jan 2003	Yhdyskuntatutkimus	EVA	2133	18%	56%	26%	38%
26 Nov 2003 – 16 Jan 2004	Yhdyskuntatutkimus	EVA	1310	20%	55%	25%	35%
24 Nov 2004 – 20 Jan 2005	Yhdyskuntatutkimus	EVA	2264	22%	53%	25%	31%
7–22 Sep 2005	Taloustutkimus	Advisory Board for Defence Information (Ministry of Defence)	990	28%	63%	9%	35%
29 Nov 2005 – 25 Jan 2006	Yhdyskuntatutkimus	EVA	1218	20%	51%	29%	31%
14 Sep – 18 Oct 2006	TNS Gallup	Advisory Board for Defence Information (Ministry of Defence)	1011	26%	65%	10%	39%
27 Nov 2006 – 19 Jan 2007	Yhdyskuntatutkimus	EVA	1923	20%	52%	28%	32%
5–22 Nov 2007	Taloustutkimus	Advisory Board for Defence Information (Ministry of Defence)	988	26%	69%	5%	43%
28 Nov 2007 – 23 Jan 2008	Yhdyskuntatutkimus	EVA	1187	21%	54%	23%	33%
7 Aug 2008	Russia invades Georgia						
17 Oct – 4 Nov 2008	Taloustutkimus	Advisory Board for Defence Information (Ministry of Defence)	980	28%	60%	12%	32%
2 Jan – 4 Feb 2009	Yhdyskuntatutkimus	EVA	2346	24%	48%	28%	24%
25 Sep – 20 Oct 2009	Taloustutkimus	Advisory Board for Defence Information (Ministry of Defence)	981	28%	62%	10%	34%
24 Sep – 11 Oct 2010	Taloustutkimus	Advisory Board for Defence Information (Ministry of Defence)	1017	25%	68%	7%	43%
21 Jan – 23 Feb 2011	Yhdyskuntatutkimus	EVA	1918	19%	50%	30%	31%
21 Nov – 11 Dec 2011	Taloustutkimus	Advisory Board for Defence Information (Ministry of Defence)	965	20%	70%	10%	50%
12–23 Jan 2012	Taloustutkimus	EVA	1271	14%	65%	21%	51%
20 Sep – 10 Oct 2012	Taloustutkimus	Advisory Board for Defence Information (Ministry of Defence)	1017	18%	71%	10%	53%
18–30 Jan 2013	Taloustutkimus	EVA	2023	18%	55%	27%	37%
5–11 Jun 2013	Taloustutkimus	Yle News	1000	29%	52%	18%	23%
26 Sep – 13 Oct 2013	Taloustutkimus	Advisory Board for Defence Information (Ministry of Defence)	1038	21%	70%	10%	49%
14–30 Jan 2014	Taloustutkimus	EVA	2052	18%	51%	30%	33%
16 Mar 2014	Russia's annexation of Crimea						
26 Sep – 12 Oct 2014	Taloustutkimus	Advisory Board for Defence Information (Ministry of Defence)	1023	30%	60%	10%	30%
9–22 Jan 2015	Taloustutkimus	EVA	2056	26%	43%	32%	17%
5–23 Nov 2015	Taloustutkimus	Advisory Board for Defence Information (Ministry of Defence)	1005	27%	58%	15%	31%
8–19 Jan 2016	Taloustutkimus	EVA	2040	27%	46%	27%	19%
22 Sep – 11 Oct 2016	Taloustutkimus	Advisory Board for Defence Information (Ministry of Defence)	1000	25%	61%	14%	36%
11–23 Jan 2017	Taloustutkimus	EVA	2040	25%	46%	29%	21%
22 Sep – 10 Oct 2017	Taloustutkimus	Advisory Board for Defence Information (Ministry of Defence)	1001	22%	62%	17%	40%
16–27 Oct 2017	Kantar TNS	Helsingin Sanomat	[?]	22%	59%	19%	37%
29 Nov – 5 Dec 2017	Taloustutkimus	Yle News	1005	19%	53%	28%	34%
24 Sep – 4 Oct 2018	Taloustutkimus	EVA	2073	23%	46%	31%	23%
21 Sep – 7 Oct 2018	Taloustutkimus	Advisory Board for Defence Information (Ministry of Defence)	1034	20%	59%	21%	39%
9–22 Oct 2019	Taloustutkimus	EVA	2036	22%	47%	32%	25%
20–29 Nov 2019	Kantar TNS	Helsingin Sanomat	1002	20%	56%	24%	36%
14 Nov – 3 Dec 2019	Taloustutkimus	Advisory Board for Defence Information (Ministry of Defence)	1011	20%	64%	16%	44%
16 Sep – 6 Oct 2020	Taloustutkimus	Advisory Board for Defence Information (Ministry of Defence)	1169	21%	53%	25%	32%
16–28 Oct 2020	Taloustutkimus	EVA	2019	22%	45%	32%	23%
15 Sep – 5 Oct 2021	Taloustutkimus	Advisory Board for Defence Information (Ministry of Defence)	1001	24%	51%	24%	27%
24 Sep – 10 Oct 2021	Taloustutkimus	EVA	2042	26%	40%	33%	14%
3–16 Jan 2022	Kantar TNS	Helsingin Sanomat	1003	28%	42%	30%	14%
13–21 Jan 2022	Taloustutkimus	MTV News	1005	30%	43%	27%	13%
24 Feb 2022	Russia invades Ukraine						
23–25 Feb 2022	Taloustutkimus	Yle	1382	53%	28%	19%	25%
28 Feb – 3 Mar 2022	Kantar TNS	Helsingin Sanomat	501	48%	27%	26%	21%
9–11 Mar 2022	Taloustutkimus	Yle	1378	62%	16%	19%	46%
4–15 Mar 2022	Taloustutkimus	EVA	2074	60%	19%	21%	41%
11–16 Mar 2022	Kantar TNS	Maaseudun Tulevaisuus	1059	61%	16%	23%	45%
18–23 Mar 2022	Kantar TNS	Helsingin Sanomat	1062	54%	21%	25%	33%
28–30 Mar 2022	Kantar TNS	Helsingin Sanomat	1080	61%	16%	23%	45%
6–11 Apr 2022	Corefiner	MTV	1863	68%	12%	20%	56%
8–13 Apr 2022	Kantar TNS	Helsingin Sanomat	1057	59%	17%	24%	42%
22–27 Apr 2022	Kantar TNS	Helsingin Sanomat	1062	65%	13%	22%	52%
7 Apr – 3 May 2022	Taloustutkimus	Advisory Board for Defence Information (Ministry of Defence)	1002	68%	15%	17%	53%
4–6 May 2022	Taloustutkimus	Yle	1270	76%	12%	11%	64%
9–10 May 2022	Kantar TNS	Helsingin Sanomat	1002	73%	12%	15%	61%
18 May 2022	Finland and Sweden applied for NATO membership						
20–26 Jun 2022	Kantar TNS	Helsingin Sanomat	1003	79%	10%	11%	69%
14 Sep – 2 Oct 2022	Taloustutkimus	Advisory Board for Defence Information (Ministry of Defence)	1033	85%	12%	3%	73%
19–31 Oct 2022	Taloustutkimus	EVA	2088	78%	8%	14%	70%
30 Jan – 1 Feb 2023	Taloustutkimus	Iltasanomat	1021	82%	8%	10%	74%
4 Apr 2023	Finland accedes to NATO						
15–27 Sep 2023	Taloustutkimus	EVA	2045	77%	8%	14%	69%
7 March 2024	Sweden accedes to NATO						
15–27 Nov 2024	Taloustutkimus	EVA	2045	71%	10%	17%	61%
12–24 Mar 2025	Taloustutkimus	EVA	2070	66%	11%	20%	55%

Accession of Finland to NATO
Protocol to the North Atlantic Treaty on the Accession of the Republic of Finland French: Protocole au traité de l'Atlantique Nord sur l'Accession de la République de Finlande Finnish: Pöytäkirja Pohjois-Atlantin sopimukseen Suomen tasavallan liittymisestä Swedish: Protokoll till Nordatlantiska fördraget om Republiken Finlands anslutning
- NATO members Finland Simultaneous NATO applicant (Sweden)
- Type: Accession treaty
- Signed: 5 July 2022
- Location: Brussels, Belgium
- Effective: 4 April 2023
- Condition: Entry into force of the accession treaty after ratification by all current NATO members. Membership of Finland starts after deposit of its instrument of accession after the treaty has entered into force.
- Ratifiers: 30 / 30
- Depositary: United States
- Languages: English and French

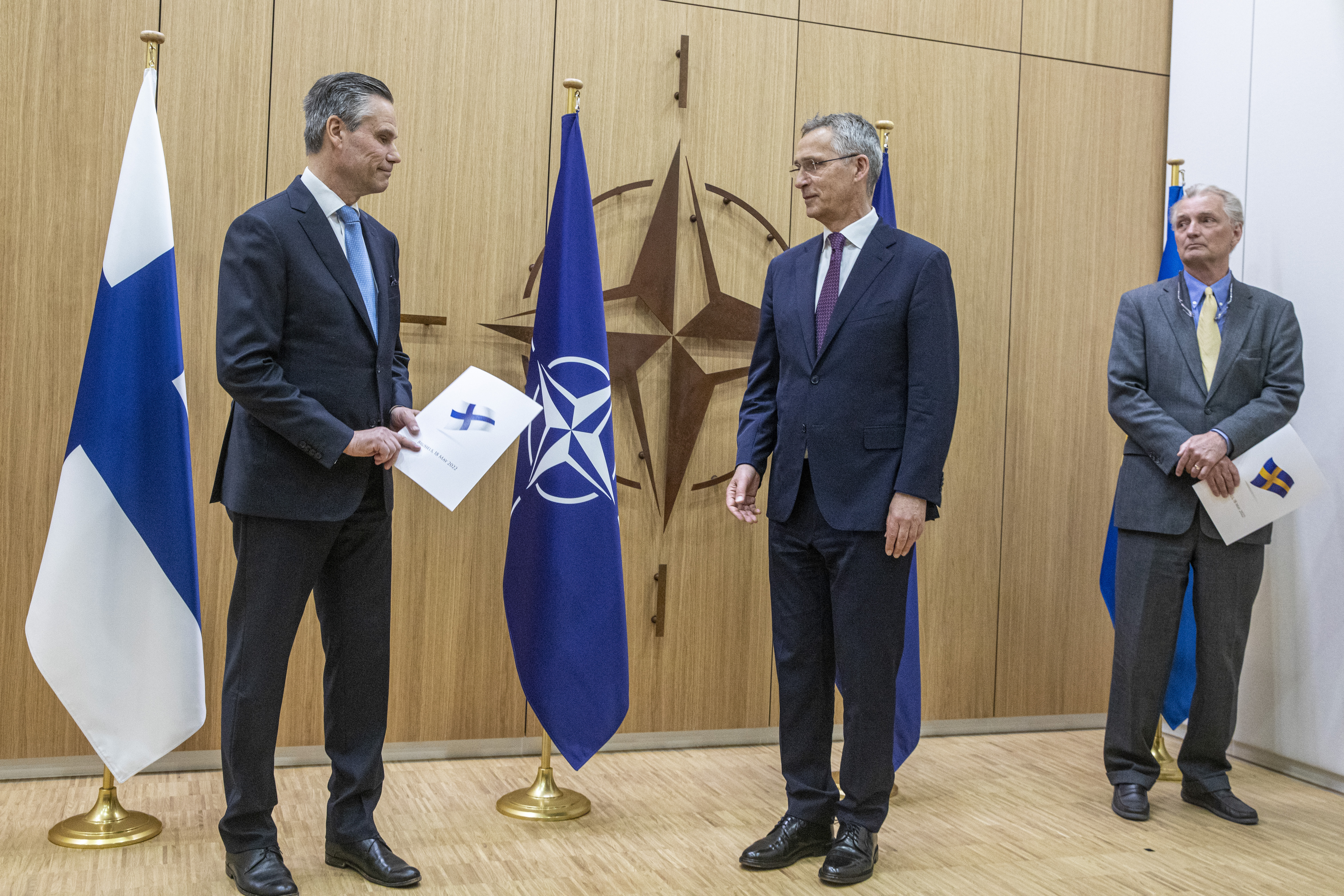
Finnish and Swedish ambassadors submit their applications to join NATO to Secretary General Jens Stoltenberg

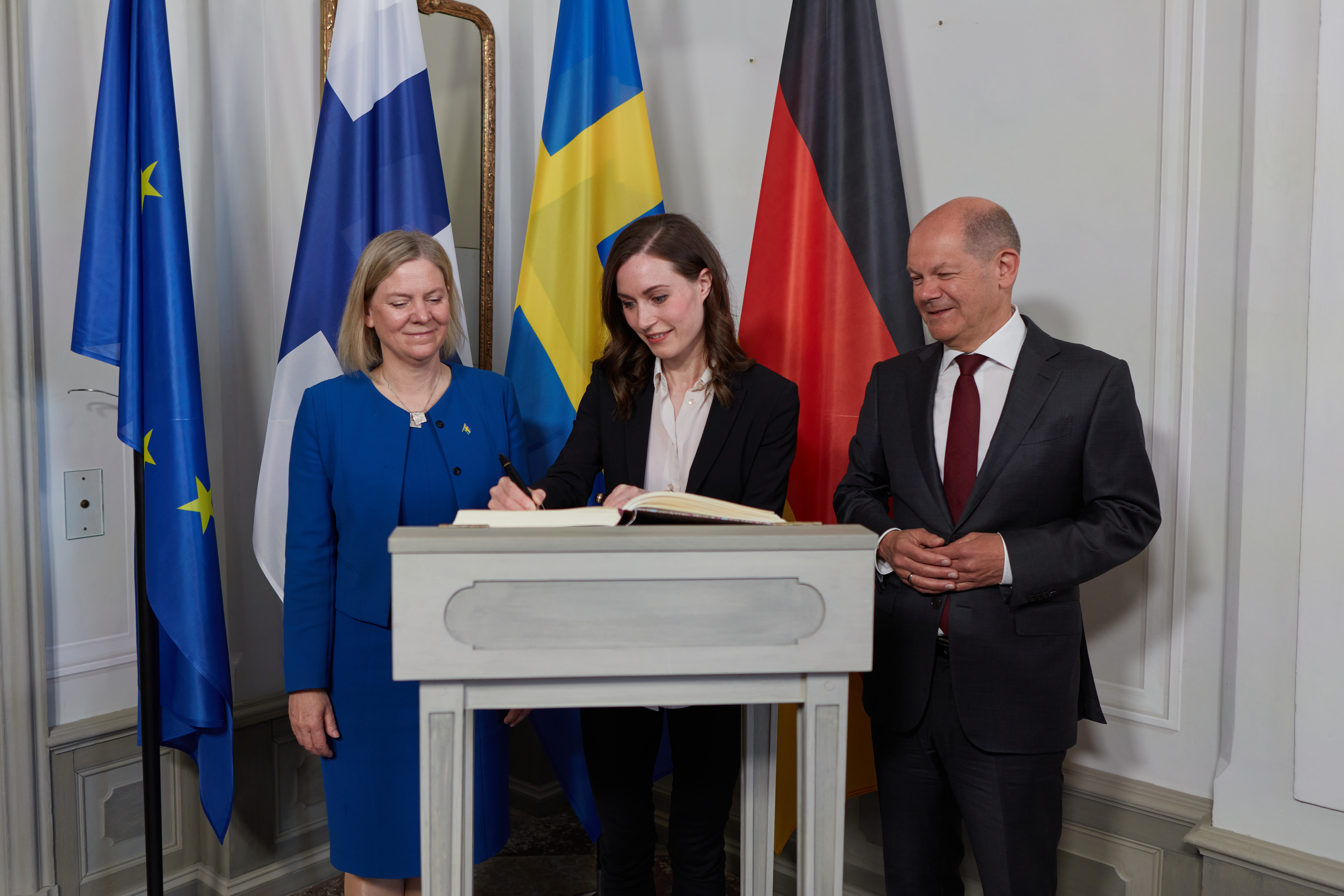
Magdalena Andersson (on the left), Sanna Marin and Olaf Scholz held talks about potential NATO membership for Finland and Sweden in spring 2022.

===== May–June 2022: Declaration of intent, application =====
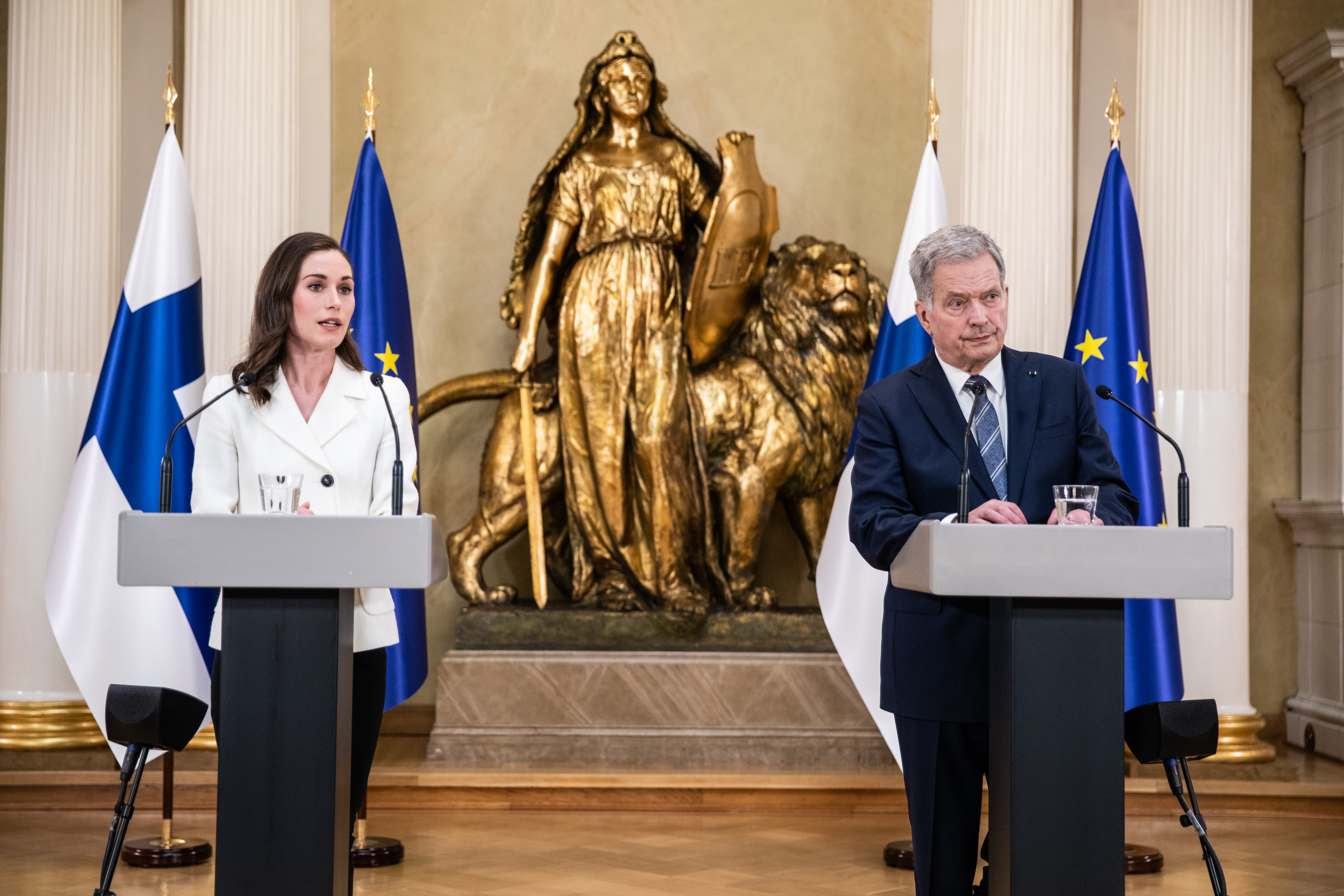
Prime Minister Sanna Marin and President Sauli Niinistö at the press conference announcing Finland's intent to apply to NATO on 15 May 2022.

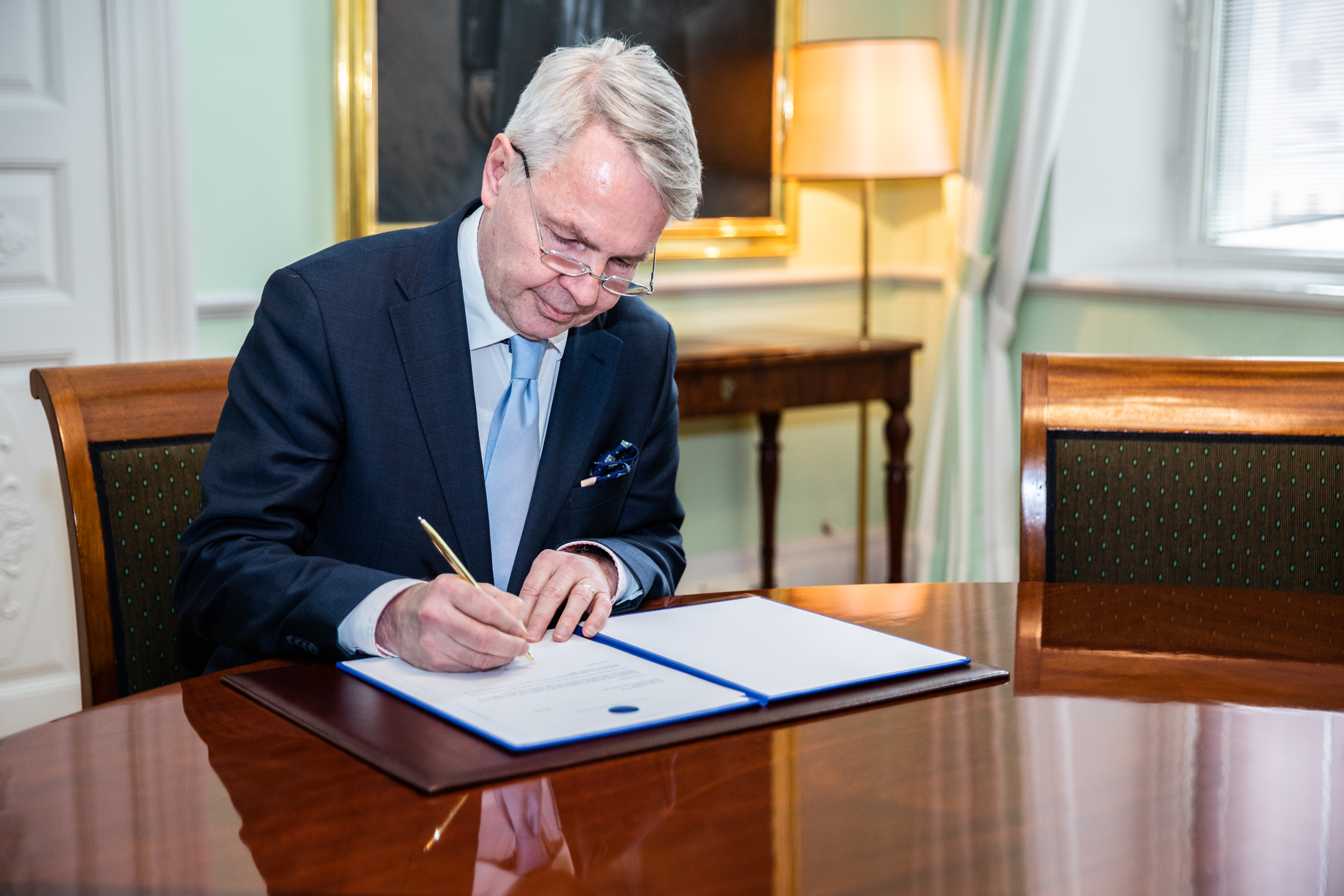
Foreign minister Pekka Haavisto signing Finland's application for NATO membership in 2022

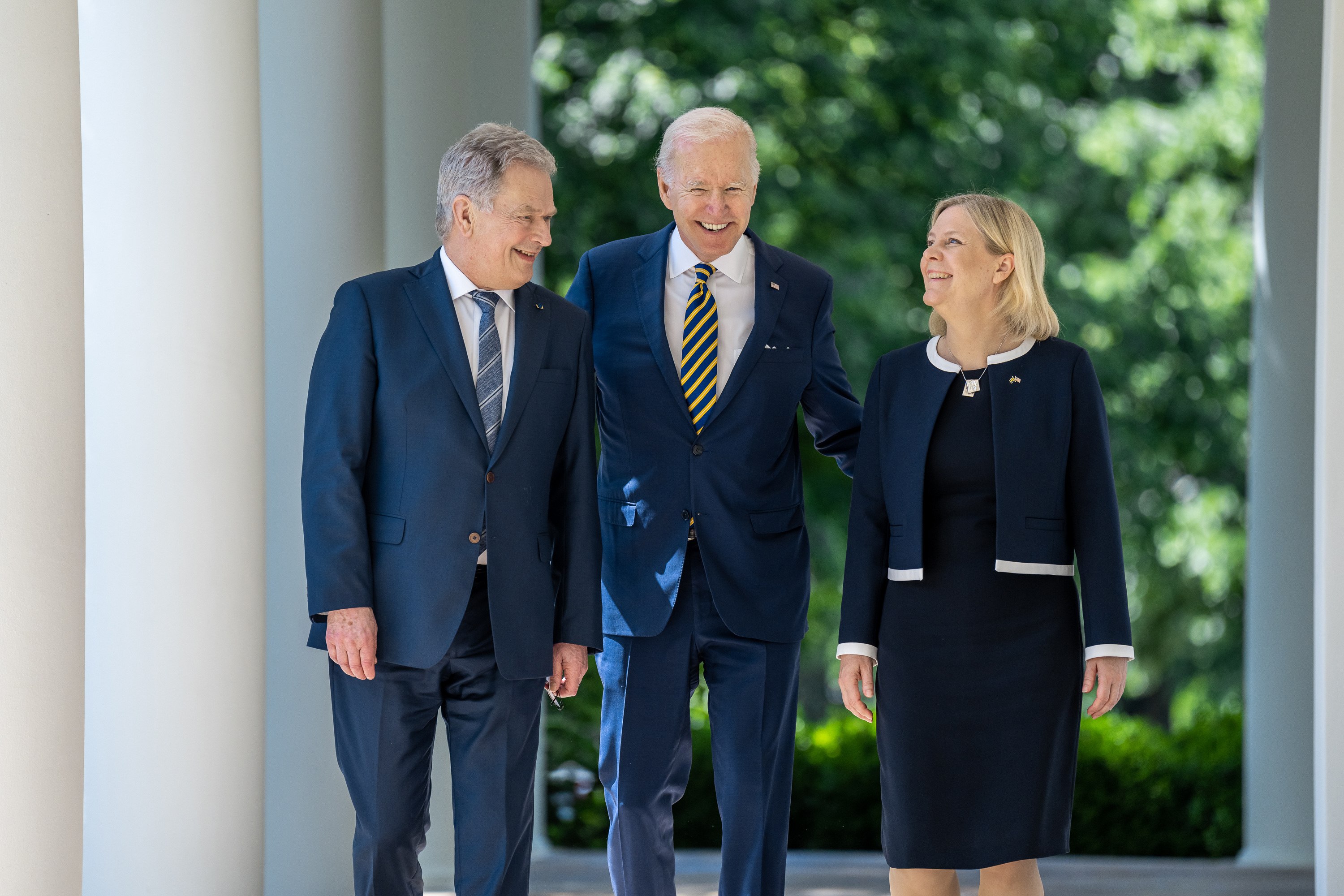
US President Joe Biden with Finnish President Sauli Niinistö and Swedish Prime Minister Magdalena Andersson 19 May 2022

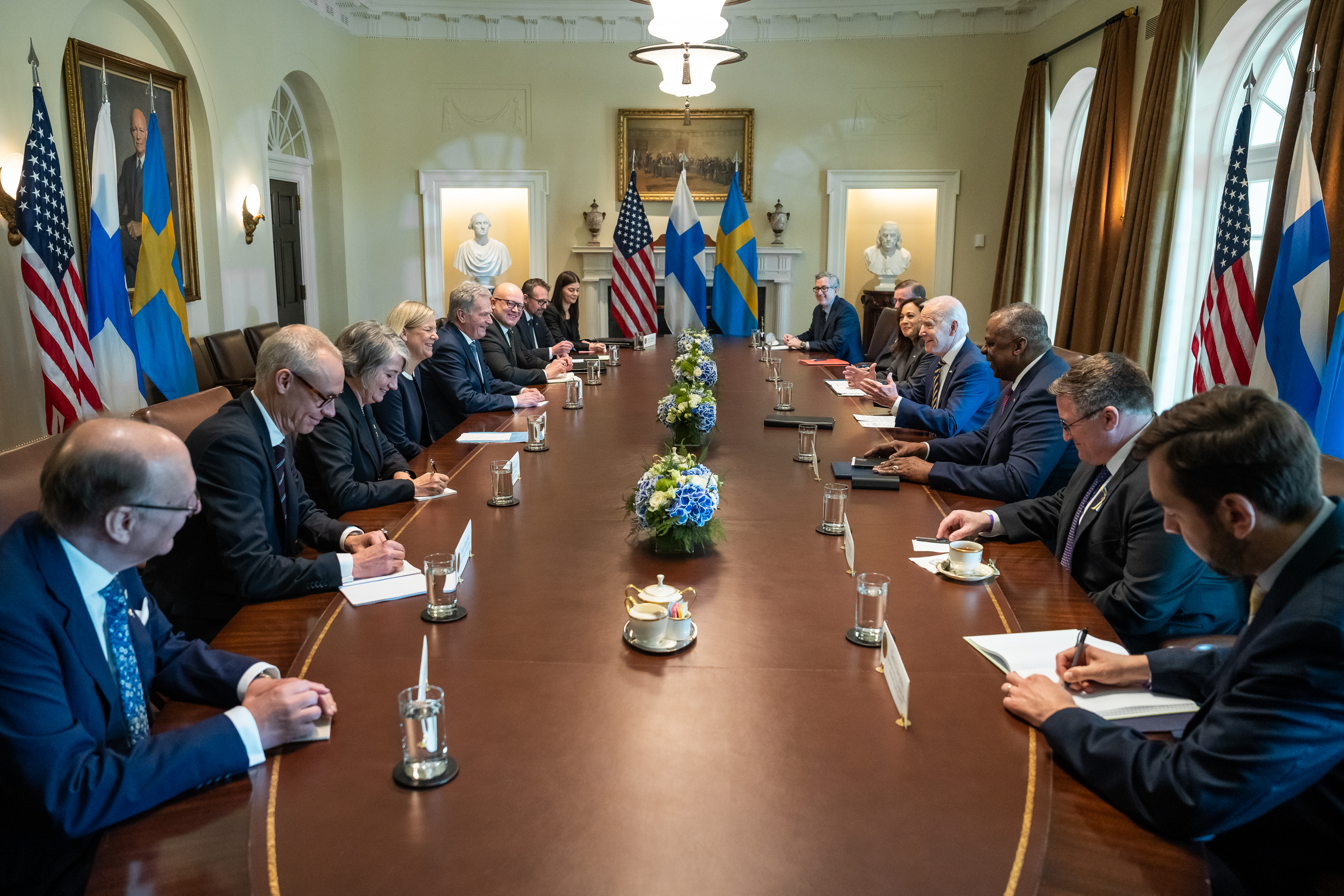
US Vice President Kamala Harris and President Joe Biden with Finnish President Sauli Niinistö and Swedish Prime Minister Magdalena Andersson in Washington discussing Sweden's and Finland's NATO applications.

On 12 May 2022, Finnish president Sauli Niinistö and prime minister Sanna Marin announced in a joint press conference that they were in favour of seeking NATO membership "without delay". On 15 May 2022, Niinistö and Marin announced that the president and Ministerial Committee on Foreign and Security Policy had adopted a report endorsing Finland joining NATO, beginning the formal constitutional process of applying. A Finnish application had been anticipated following the Russian invasion of Ukraine degrading the European security environment, and a significant shift in Finnish public opinion on the desirability of membership.

The government's proposal to join was approved in parliament by 188 votes to 8 on 17 May. The next day, Finland submitted an official application to NATO in Brussels jointly with Sweden; the organisation considered the applications and then negotiations began. Negotiations were expected to take weeks, after which Finland would participate in NATO activities at all levels on a provisional basis during the ratification period. With negotiations concluded and a reconfirmation of the applicant's intent to join, the accession protocol needed ratification by all the existing NATO member states; this was estimated to take between four months and a year. After ratification was completed, the Parliament of Finland needed to pass an Act to formally bring the accession into force.

During the interval between initiating an application and membership entering into force, Finland was at risk. Jens Stoltenberg, NATO Secretary General, said that Finland could join the alliance "very quickly" and that there would be some degree of protection for Finland during that period. Non-binding security promises were received from the United Kingdom and the United States, and other reports claimed that further promises would be received from the other Nordic countries as well as France and Germany.

The European Union announced its support for Finland and Sweden's NATO membership. Croatia's president Zoran Milanović stated that his country should block ratification of Finland's accession until electoral reform measures are implemented in neighbouring Bosnia and Herzegovina, though the Foreign Minister expressed the government's support for any application. On 28 April 2022, Croatian Foreign Minister Gordan Grlić-Radman announced that Croatia supports Finland and Sweden's applications for membership in NATO. In May 2022, the Portuguese government announced that they would fully support Finland and Sweden's NATO membership. Turkish president Recep Tayyip Erdoğan voiced his opposition to Finland and Sweden joining NATO, saying that it would be "impossible" for Turkey to support their application while the two countries allow groups which Turkey classifies as terrorist organizations, including the Kurdish militant groups Kurdistan Workers' Party (PKK), Kurdistan Communities Union (KCK), Democratic Union Party (Syria) (PYD), and People's Defense Units (YPG) and the supporters of Fethullah Gülen, a US-based Muslim cleric accused by Turkey of orchestrating a failed 2016 Turkish coup d'état attempt, to operate on their territory. (The PKK is on the European Union's list of terrorist organizations.) Turkey requested the extradition of alleged PKK members from the Nordic countries and demanded the arms embargo imposed by the Finnish and Swedish governments in response to its 2019 Turkish offensive into north-eastern Syria against the YPG be lifted. Turkey's demands for extradition of Kurdish and other political dissidents has been met with hostility by Kurdish activists and some human rights organizations, due to Turkey's poor human rights record and suppression of the Kurdish minority in Turkey. On 15 May 2022, Finnish Foreign Minister Pekka Haavisto and Swedish Foreign Minister Ann Linde announced that they are ready to address Turkey's security concerns and have always condemned terrorism. On 16 May 2022, Finnish Prime Minister Sanna Marin underlined that they are always ready for dialogue with Turkey regarding NATO membership and that the problem will be resolved as soon as possible. On 17 May 2022, German Chancellor Olaf Scholz called on Turkey to approve Finland and Sweden's NATO membership. On 18 May 2022, Turkey quickly prevented Finland and Sweden from starting NATO membership negotiations. On the same day, Turkey asked Finland and Sweden, to end their support for PKK, PYD, YPG and the Gülen movement and to stop their activities. On 19 May 2022, Finland and Sweden announced that they could address Turkey's security concerns. On the same day, Finnish President Sauli Niinistö and Former Swedish Prime Minister Magdalena Andersson announced that they were always ready for talks with Turkey and always condemned terrorism. On 21 May 2022, Finnish President Sauli Niinistö, after a phone call with Turkish President Recep Tayyip Erdoğan, stated that Finland is ready for dialogue with Turkey on NATO membership and has always condemned terrorism.

On 24 May 2022, Finland and Sweden sent a delegation to meet with Turkey. Jukka Salovaara from Finland, Oscar Stenström from Sweden, İbrahim Kalın and Sedat Önal from Turkey served in the memorandum negotiations. The first meeting of the delegations of Finland, Sweden and Turkey was held on 25 May 2022 in Ankara, Turkey. The second meeting of the delegations of Finland, Sweden and Turkey was held on 20 June 2022 in Brussels, Belgium. The ruling parties in Turkey, the AKP and MHP, announced that they would not support the membership of Finland and Sweden, while the opposition parties CHP and HDP in Turkey announced that they support the membership of Finland and Sweden. Finnish President Niinistö said that he had earlier received favourable response, including from Erdoğan and foreign minister Mevlüt Çavuşoğlu, about Finland's membership; Niinistö and Haavisto urged patience, while Jussi Halla-aho, chair of the Foreign Affairs Committee, suggested that Turkey wished to draw attention to Swedish policies, rather than to Finland's. Niinistö stated in June that his country would not move forward with their application without Sweden, and that the two countries would join NATO "hand in hand". On 1 June 2022, Finnish President Niinistö stated in a statement regarding Finland's NATO membership that Turkey could address its concerns about terrorism, that it was always open to dialogue and that they always condemned terrorism. Speaking later, İbrahim Kalın, spokesman for Erdoğan, said that approving Finnish membership was not being ruled out, but that the status of these groups was "a matter of national security for Turkey" and that negotiation would be required. After Kalın's statement, Erdoğan reiterated his threat to block Finland's and Sweden's membership applications. NATO leadership and the United States said they were confident Turkey would not hold up the two countries accession process. Canadian Foreign Minister Mélanie Joly also held talks with Turkey to convince the Turkish government of the need for the two Nordic nations' integration. On 21 May, Erdoğan and Sauli Niinistö had a phone call to discuss Finland's NATO bid. Niinistö reiterated Finland's condemnation of terrorism in all forms. Kalın stated after the first meeting in Ankara that the process would not progress until Turkey's expectations were met and they did not feel any time pressure on them. After a delegation consisting of Swedish and Finnish diplomats held talks on the matter with its Turkish counterparts, Erdoğan repeated that he would not consent to their accession bid as the same day the talks were held in Ankara, Salih Muslim, who is considered a terrorist by Erdoğan, appeared on Swedish television. Nationalist Movement Party leader Devlet Bahçeli suggested that a scenario in which Turkey would leave NATO should be considered an option, in which case a new military alliance could be founded. In late May 2022, opposition leader Kemal Kılıçdaroğlu argued that in case the accession row persisted and AKP and MHP decided to close the Inçirlik Air Base, the CHP would support this.

===== June 2022 – April 2023: Ratification =====
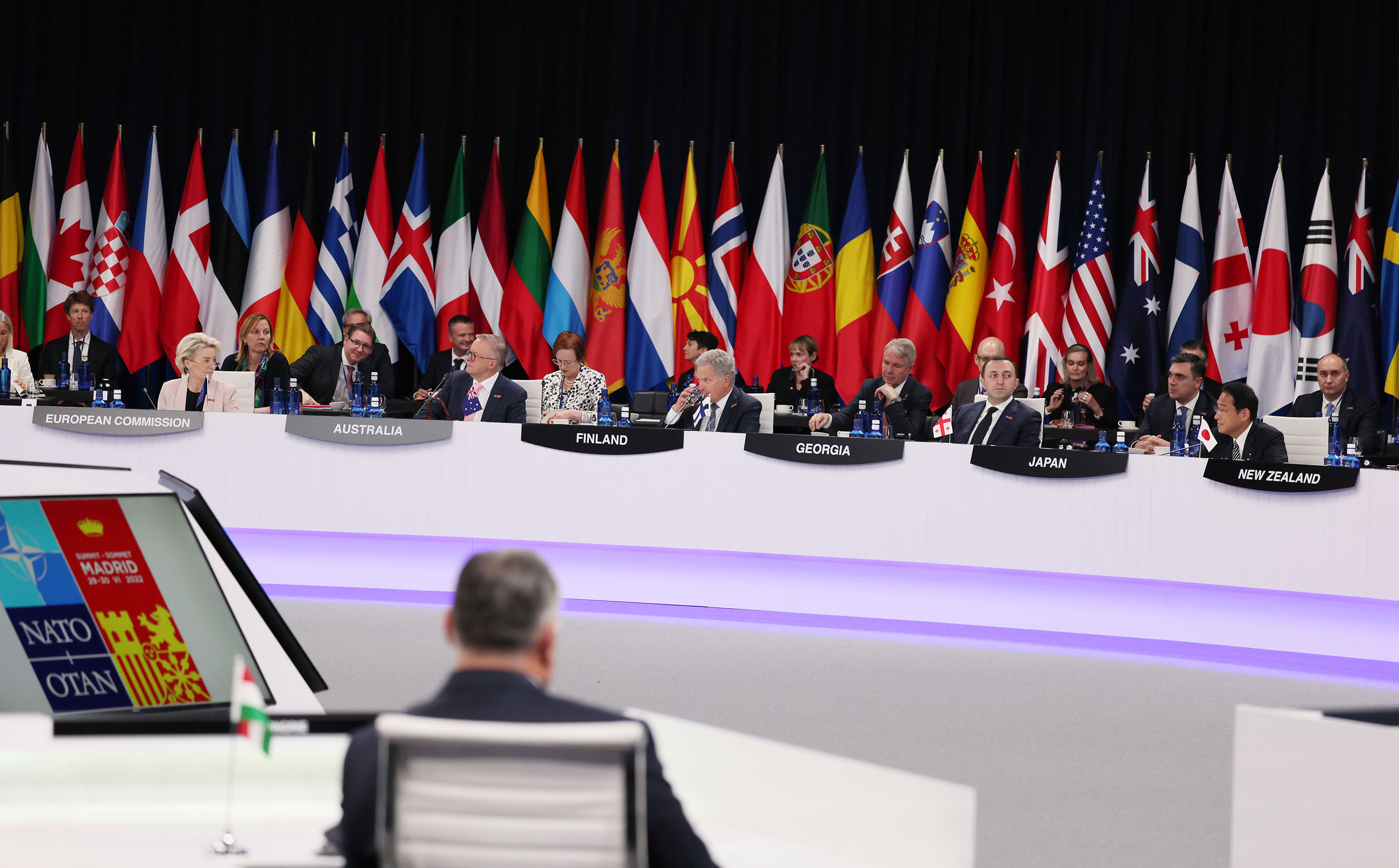
Finnish president Sauli Niinistö attended the 2022 Madrid summit.

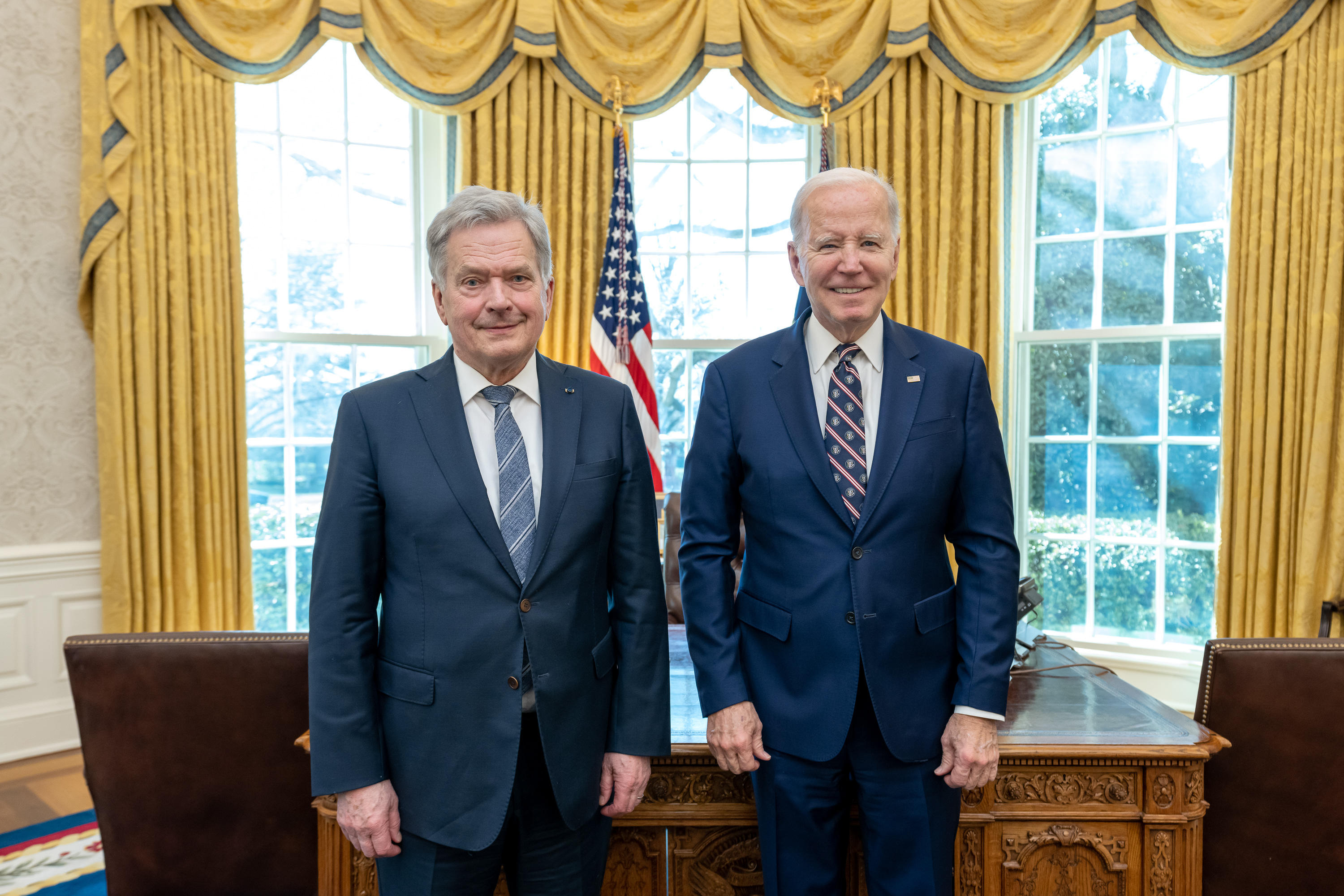
Finnish President Sauli Niinistö with US President Joe Biden in Washington, D.C., United States on 9 March 2023

At the 2022 Madrid summit on 28 June, Niinistö, Swedish Prime Minister Magdalena Andersson, and Erdoğan signed an agreement to address Turkey's security concerns, and Niinistö announced that Turkey had agreed to support membership of NATO for Finland and Sweden. In June 2022, Finnish President Sauli Niinistö announced in Madrid, after the agreement with Turkey, that Finland does not see the YPG as a terrorist organization and that Finland will continue to support the YPG. The accession process began the following day, with the unanimous agreement of NATO members to formally invite the countries to join. Negotiations were held on 4 July 2022, and the Accession Protocols were signed in Brussels on 5 July 2022. However, Erdogan reiterated his threat to veto their membership, stating that he expected the applicant countries to meet their obligations under the agreement before the Turkish Grand National Assembly would consider approving their accession protocol. On 9 August 2022, U.S. President Joe Biden signed and approved the decision for Finland and Sweden to apply for membership in NATO. Finland, Sweden and Turkey held their first trilateral memorandum meeting on 26 August 2022 in Vantaa, Finland. The second memorandum meeting between Finland, Sweden and Turkey was held on 25 November 2022 in Stockholm, Sweden.

On 26 August 2022, Jukka Salovaara, chief negotiator responsible for Finland's NATO membership, said in a statement after the tripartite memorandum meeting in Vantaa that they are in deep consensus with Turkey. On 8 December 2022, at a press conference he gave with his Turkish counterpart Hulusi Akar during his visit to Turkey, Finnish Defense Minister Antti Kaikkonen stated that Finland has always condemned terrorism and that Finland is in full solidarity with Turkey in the fight against terrorism. By November, Finland's NATO membership had been ratified by 28 out of 30 member states, with only Hungary and Turkey yet to complete their procedures. On 24 November 2022, Hungary's Prime Minister Viktor Orbán announced that he supported Sweden and Finland's accession to NATO, promising Hungary will ratify NATO membership in January. The United States informally held up a Turkish purchase of F-16 fighter jets because of the Finnish and Swedish NATO membership issue. During the process of application, Sweden held elections resulting in a center-right government that pledged to continue the NATO process, reaffirming a united front with Finland's application, and suggesting that they would be more able to meet Turkish requirements.

On 8 January 2023, Finland's Minister of Foreign Affairs, Pekka Haavisto, told reporters that "Finland is not in such a rush to join NATO that we can't wait for Sweden to get the green light". Haavisto also stated that representatives from the Swedish and Finnish parliaments were expected to visit Ankara in January, with another meeting between the three countries scheduled for the spring. On 23 January 2023, Turkish Defense Minister Hulusi Akar announced that Turkey had fully fulfilled the Turkey–Finland–Sweden tripartite memorandum, while Finland and Sweden did not, and that Turkey expected them to comply. On 24 January 2023, Haavisto announced that the trilateral memorandum talks with Finland, Sweden and Turkey would likely be suspended until after the parliamentary and presidential elections in Turkey. The third meeting of the Finland, Sweden, and Turkey tripartite memorandum was to be held in Brussels, the capital of Belgium, in February, but the Finland, Sweden and Turkey tripartite memorandum meetings were canceled indefinitely upon Turkey's request. On 29 January 2023, Turkish President Recep Tayyip Erdoğan announced that he had requested the extradition of 130 suspected individuals in order for Finland and Sweden to be approved for NATO membership. In late January, Finland lifted its embargo on weapons exports to Turkey. On 1 February 2023, President Recep Tayyip Erdoğan announced that Turkey had a positive view of Finland's NATO membership, but not Sweden's NATO membership, due to Sweden allowing a demonstration by far-right politician Rasmus Paludan, where he had burnt the Quran.

In March 2023, Jens Stoltenberg pushed for Hungary and Turkey to finalize the accession of Finland and Sweden by the July summit. Hungary's Orban stated in March that while he and his party Fidesz supported NATO membership for Finland and Sweden, he objected to their support for the EU's freezing of funds for Hungary due to concerns about rule-of-law and corruption. Orban said "it's not right for them to ask us to take them on board while they're spreading blatant lies about Hungary, about the rule of law in Hungary, about democracy, about life here". A Hungarian delegation was sent to both countries to discuss the issue. The third meeting of the tripartite memorandum between Finland, Sweden and Turkey was held in Brussels, Belgium, on 9 March 2023. The fourth meeting of the tripartite memorandum between Finland, Sweden and Turkey was held on 14 June 2023 in Ankara, the capital of Turkey. The fifth meeting of the tripartite memorandum between Finland, Sweden and Turkey was held on 6 July 2023 in Brussels, Belgium. The sixth meeting of the tripartite memorandum between Finland, Sweden and Turkey was held on 2 May 2024 in Helsinki, Finland. On 15 March 2023, Finnish President Sauli Niinistö announced that Turkey had made a decision on Finland's application and had invited him to meet with President Erdoğan in Ankara, with both Erdoğan and Turkish officials indicating that Finland's application would be approved. Turkish officials stated that it was "highly likely" that Finland's application would be approved in mid-April, prior to the Turkish general election. Turkish officials also stated that Finland's bid would be approved independently from that of Sweden. Erdoğan publicly announced on 17 March that he would drop his opposition to Finland joining the military alliance, stating a goal of formalizing the ratification of Finland's entry into NATO prior to the 2023 Turkish general election. On 10 May 2023, Finnish Foreign Minister Pekka Haavisto, in an interview with the German magazine Tagesspiegel, stated that Turkey considers the YPG as a terrorist organization, but Finland does not see it as a terrorist organization.

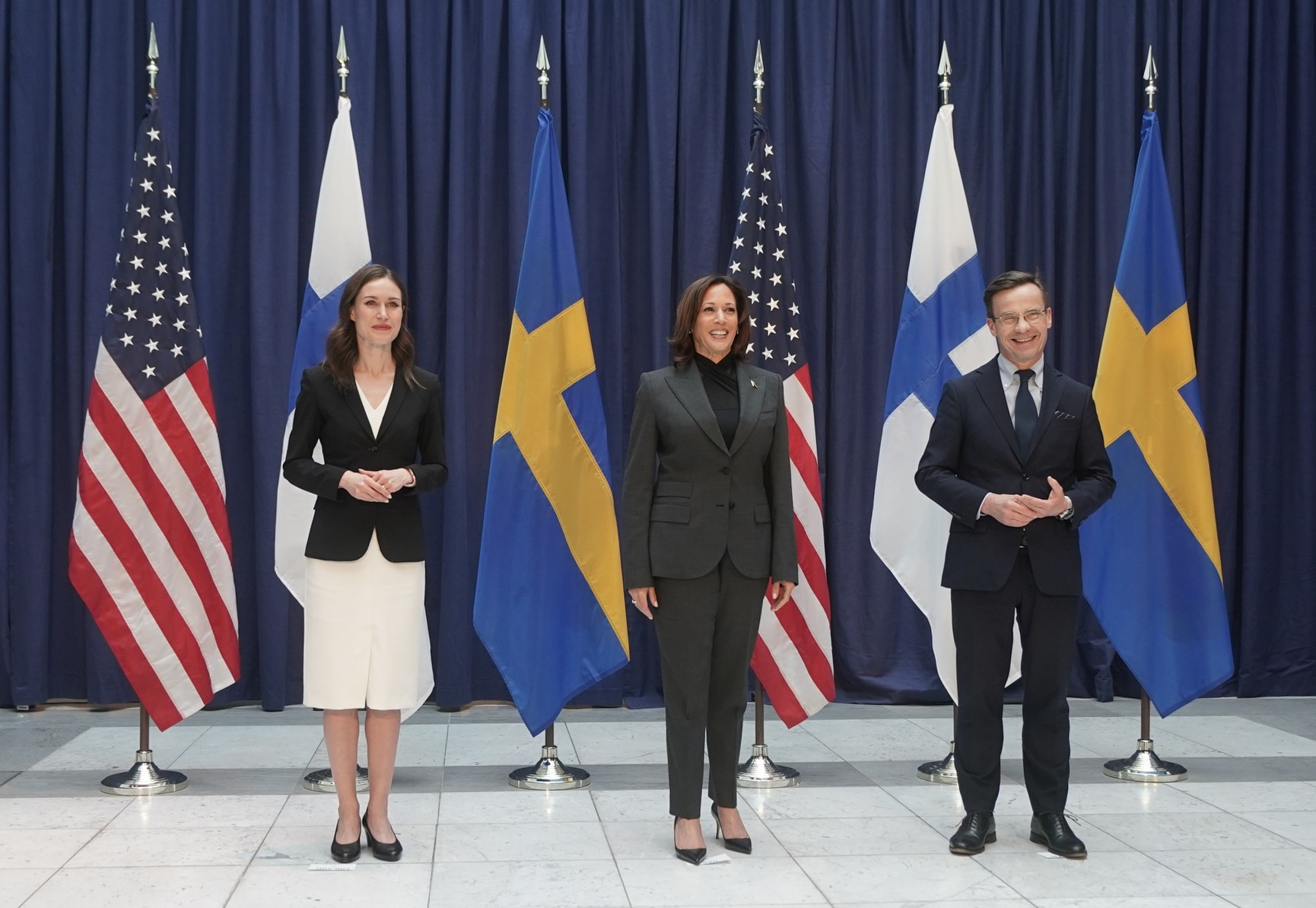
From left to right: Finnish prime minister Sanna Marin, Vice President of the United States Kamala Harris and Swedish prime minister Ulf Kristersson at the 59th Munich Security Conference

While Finland's Marin originally stated that it was "very important for us, of course, that Finland and Sweden would join NATO hand in hand," with Turkey continuing to raise concerns with Sweden and an April election due in Finland the Finnish government decided to proceed independently if all NATO members approved their membership. On 1 March 2023, the Parliament of Finland approved Finland's accession to NATO by a vote of 184 in favor and 7 opposed. On 23 March 2023, the President of Finland, Sauli Niinistö, gave the presidential assent by signing the Finnish ratification.

On 17 March 2023, it was announced that Hungary's legislature would vote on the ratification of Finland's NATO accession on 27 March 2023, and that parliamentarians of the ruling party, Fidesz, would unanimously support Finland's accession to NATO. On 27 March 2023, the Hungarian parliament approved Finland's bid.

On 31 March 2023, the Turkish parliament approved Finland's NATO accession, clearing its way to join the alliance. On 1 April 2023, Erdoğan formally signed and approved the Turkish parliament's decision to ratify Finnish NATO membership. Kurdish political parties in Turkey, the Peoples' Democratic Party (HDP), abstained from voting on Finland's membership in March 2023, and the Peoples' Equality and Democracy Party (DEM) abstained and voted against Sweden's membership in January 2024. On 4 April 2023, Turkish Foreign Minister Mevlüt Çavuşoğlu delivered the document of approval for Finland's participation to U.S. Secretary of State Antony Blinken in Brussels.

Timeline of Finnish collaboration with NATO
Event	Date	Reference
Partnership for Peace	9 May 1994	
Application submitted	18 May 2022	
Invitation to join	29 June 2022	
Accession protocol	5 July 2022	
Domestic ratification	23 March 2023	
Treaty in force	4 April 2023	
Member of NATO	4 April 2023	

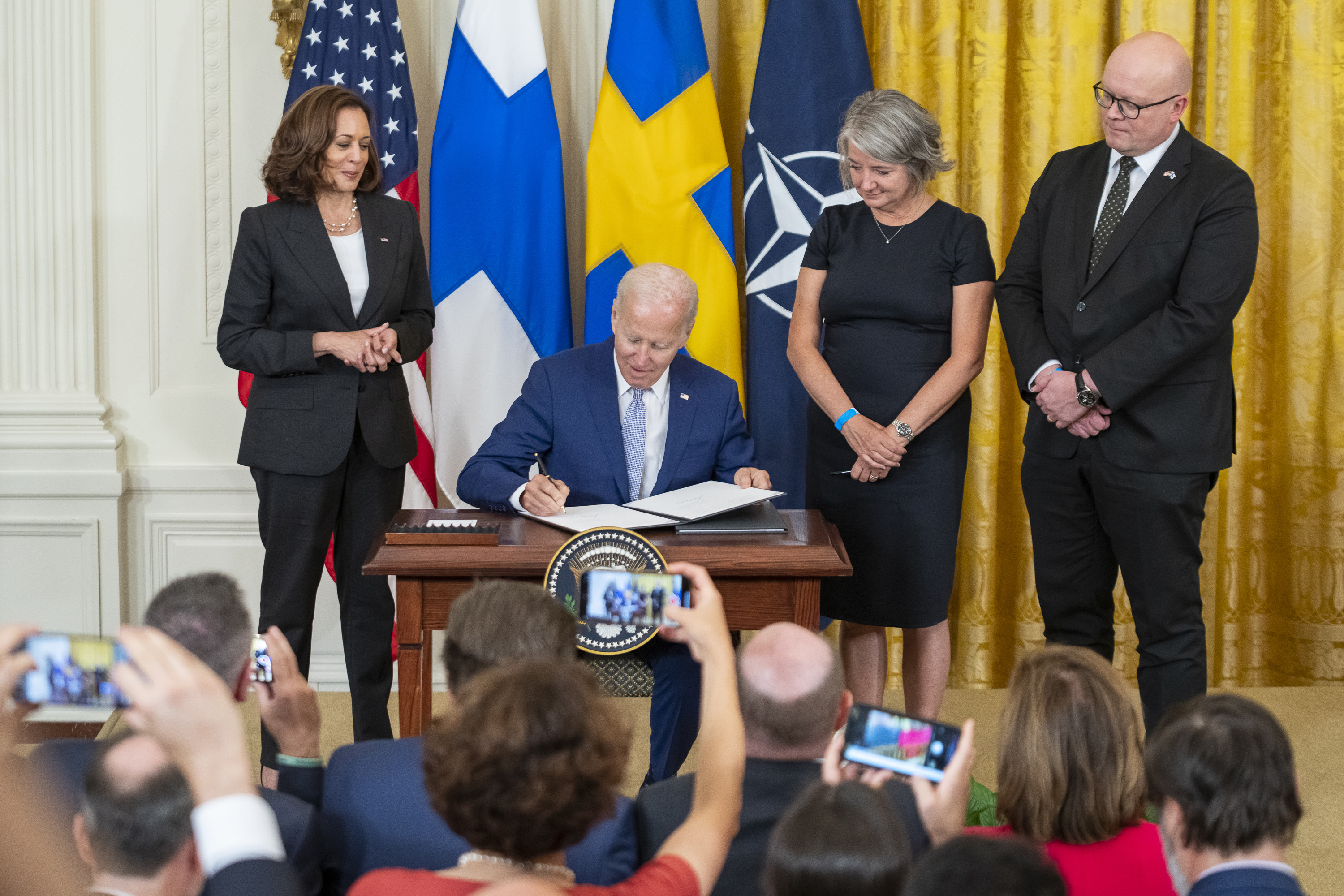
President Biden signing the Instruments of Ratification to approve Finland and Sweden's membership in NATO on 9 August 2022

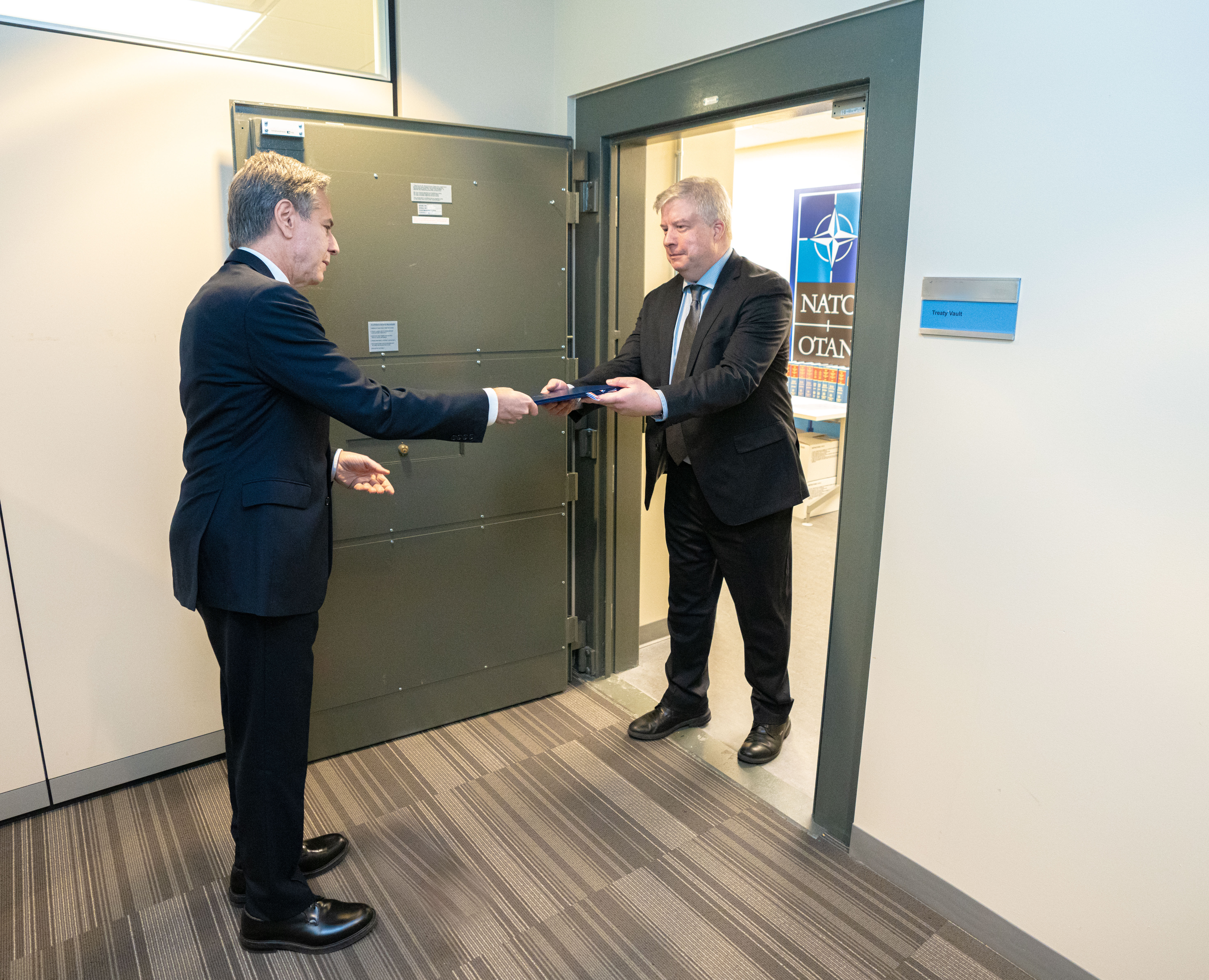
US Secretary of State Antony Blinken deposits the US Instruments of Ratification with the Depositary for the North Atlantic Treaty in August 2022.

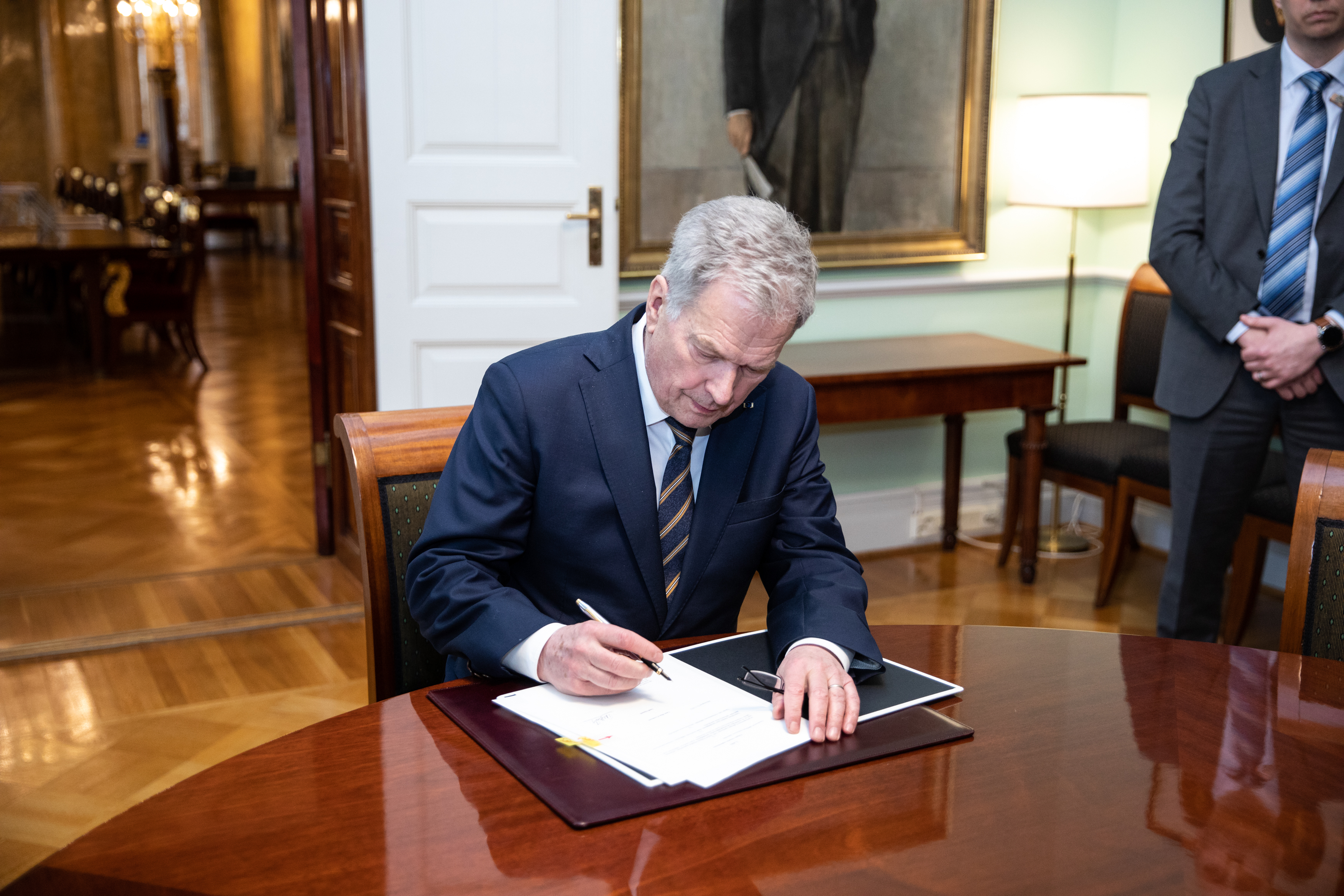
President Niinistö signed and confirmed the laws regarding Finland's NATO membership approved by the Finnish parliament on 23 March 2023.

Member assent to Finnish membership in NATO
Signatory	Date	Institution	In favour	Against	AB	Deposited
Albania	7 July 2022	Parliament	114	0	0	11 August 2022
Albania	10 July 2022	Presidential assent	Granted			11 August 2022
Belgium	20 July 2022	Chamber of Representatives	121	11	0	11 August 2022
Belgium	21 July 2022	Royal assent	Granted			11 August 2022
Bulgaria	13 July 2022	National Assembly	195	11	0	9 August 2022
Bulgaria	18 July 2022	Presidential assent	Granted			9 August 2022
Canada	5 July 2022	Government (Note: In Canada, the ratification of treaties is a royal prerogative of the monarch. As such, Parliament has no role or authority in ratifying treaties.)	Granted			5 July 2022
Croatia	15 July 2022	Sabor	124	3	0	25 August 2022
Croatia	19 July 2022	Presidential assent	Granted			25 August 2022
Czech Republic	27 August 2022	Chamber of Deputies	134	4	14	19 September 2022
Czech Republic	10 August 2022	Senate	64	0	1	19 September 2022
Czech Republic	31 August 2022	Presidential assent	Granted			19 September 2022
Denmark	7 June 2022	Folketing	95	0	0	5 July 2022
Estonia	6 July 2022	Riigikogu	79	0	3	22 July 2022
Estonia	6 July 2022	Presidential assent	Granted			22 July 2022
France	2 August 2022	National Assembly	209	46	53	16 August 2022
France	21 July 2022	Senate	323	17	8	16 August 2022
France	5 August 2022	Presidential assent	Granted			16 August 2022
Germany	8 July 2022	Bundestag	Passed (Note: The vote was taken by party rather than as a full recorded vote. In favor: SPD, The Greens, FDP, CDU/CSU, AfD. Against: The Left.)			20 July 2022
Germany	8 July 2022	Bundesrat	Passed (Note: Unanimous consent.)			20 July 2022
Germany	11 July 2022	Presidential assent	Granted			20 July 2022
Greece	15 September 2022	Parliament	Passed (Note: The vote was taken by party rather than as a full recorded vote. In favor: ND, SYRIZA, PASOK-KINAL. Against: KKE, Greek Solution, MeRA25.)			14 October 2022
Greece	15 September 2022	Presidential promulgation	Granted			14 October 2022
Hungary	27 March 2023	National Assembly	182	6	0	31 March 2023
Hungary	28 March 2023	Presidential assent	Granted			31 March 2023
Iceland	7 June 2022	Althing	44	0	5	6 July 2022
Iceland	5 July 2022	Presidential assent	Granted			6 July 2022
Italy	2 August 2022	Chamber of Deputies	398	20	9	17 August 2022
Italy	3 August 2022	Senate	202	13	2	17 August 2022
Italy	5 August 2022	Presidential assent	Granted			17 August 2022
Latvia	14 July 2022	Saeima	77	0	0	22 July 2022
Latvia	15 July 2022	Presidential assent	Granted			22 July 2022
Lithuania	20 July 2022	Seimas	113	0	0	4 August 2022
Lithuania	20 July 2022	Presidential assent	Granted			4 August 2022
Luxembourg	12 July 2022	Chamber of Deputies	58	0	2	9 August 2022
Luxembourg	22 July 2022	Grand Ducal promulgation	Granted			9 August 2022
Montenegro	28 July 2022	Parliament	57	2	11	13 September 2022
Montenegro	1 August 2022	Presidential assent	Granted			13 September 2022
Netherlands	7 July 2022	House of Representatives	142	8	0	20 July 2022
Netherlands	12 July 2022	Senate	71	1	0	20 July 2022
Netherlands	13 July 2022	Royal promulgation	Granted			20 July 2022
North Macedonia	27 July 2022	Assembly	103	2	0	22 August 2022
North Macedonia	27 July 2022	Presidential assent	Granted			22 August 2022
Norway	16 June 2022	Storting	98	4	0	7 July 2022
Norway	22 June 2022	Royal assent	Granted			7 July 2022
Poland	7 July 2022	Sejm	440	1 (Note: Robert Winnicki (Confederation) later released a statement saying that he had erroneously opposed the proposition, believing it to be a vote on a different item of legislation. Winnicki had voted to approve Sweden's accession on the same day.)	1	3 August 2022
Poland	20 July 2022	Senate	98	0	0	3 August 2022
Poland	22 July 2022	Presidential assent	Granted			3 August 2022
Portugal	16 September 2022	Assembly	219	11	0	11 October 2022
Portugal	19 September 2022	Presidential assent	Granted			11 October 2022
Romania	20 July 2022	Chamber of Deputies	227	0	3	22 August 2022
Romania	20 July 2022	Senate	94	0	0	22 August 2022
Romania	22 July 2022	Presidential assent	Granted			22 August 2022
Slovakia	27 September 2022	National Council	126	15	1	4 October 2022
Slovakia	28 September 2022	Presidential assent	Granted			4 October 2022
Slovenia	14 July 2022	National Assembly	76	5	0	24 August 2022
Slovenia	22 July 2022	Presidential assent	Granted			24 August 2022
Spain	15 September 2022	Congress of Deputies	290	11	47	6 October 2022
Spain	21 September 2022	Senate	245	1	17	6 October 2022
Spain	27 September 2022	Royal assent	Granted			6 October 2022
Turkey	30 March 2023	Grand National Assembly	276	0	0	4 April 2023
Turkey	31 March 2023	Presidential assent (legislative)	Granted			4 April 2023
Turkey	1 April 2023	Presidential assent (executive)	Granted			4 April 2023
United Kingdom	5 July 2022	Government (Note: In the United Kingdom, the ratification of treaties is a royal prerogative of the monarch. As such, Parliament has no role or authority in ratifying treaties, but the Constitutional Reform and Governance Act 2010 and the Ponsonby Rule require that treaties be laid before Parliament with an explanatory memorandum before ratification by the monarch.)	Granted			8 July 2022
United States	3 August 2022	Senate	95	1	1	18 August 2022
United States	9 August 2022	Presidential assent	Granted			18 August 2022

Finnish actions in NATO accession
Signatory	Date	Institution	In favour	Against	AB	Deposited
Finland	17 May 2022	Parliament (motion on application)	188	8	3	4 April 2023
Finland	1 March 2023	Parliament (accession)	184	7	8	4 April 2023
Finland	23 March 2023	Presidential assent (accession)	Granted			4 April 2023

=== 2023–present: Finnish membership in NATO ===
Finland became an official member of the alliance on 4 April 2023, exactly 74 years after the signing of the North Atlantic Treaty which established NATO. The flag of Finland was raised simultaneously at NATO headquarters in Brussels, at SHAPE in Mons, and at the JFC-NF headquarters in Norfolk, Virginia, while the Finnish national anthem was played. Reacting to Finland's accession, Russia said it would increase its forces along the Finland–Russia border if NATO sends troops to Finland. Stoltenberg said there would be no NATO troops stationed in Finland without the consent of the Finnish government.

The formal ceremony for Finland's accession to NATO was immediately followed by Foreign Minister of Finland Pekka Haavisto submitting Finland's ratification of Sweden's accession to the organization.

On 1 March 2024, Alexander Stubb, a staunch supporter of NATO, was sworn in as Finland's new president. On 7 March 2024, Stubb made his first foreign trip as Finland's new president to NATO's Nordic Response military exercise in northern Norway. On 7 March 2024, neighbouring Sweden finally became a member of NATO.

In July 2024, President Stubb approved Defence Cooperation Agreement between Finland and the United States (DCA).

In September 2024, it was announced that Finland would host two NATO headquarters. Mikkeli is expected to be announced as the headquarters for the Northern European land command unit while the multinational forward land force (FLF) will be based in Rovaniemi, Finnish Lapland. In Mikkeli, the Multi-Corps Land Component Command (MCLCC) began operations on 1 September 2025 and its official opening ceremony was held on 3 October 2025.

In December 2025, Finland will move with Sweden and Denmark from the Allied Joint Force Command Brunssum to the Joint Force Command Norfolk.

In March 2026, Minister of Defence Antti Häkkänen decided that a NATO Deployable CIS Module (DMC) will be established in Riihimäki. The DMC is scheduled to start operations in early 2027. Parliament also voted in June to loosen the country's decades-old restrictions on importing or moving nuclear weapons, allowing for easier transport of such weaponry between NATO members and improving the alliance's nuclear deterrence.

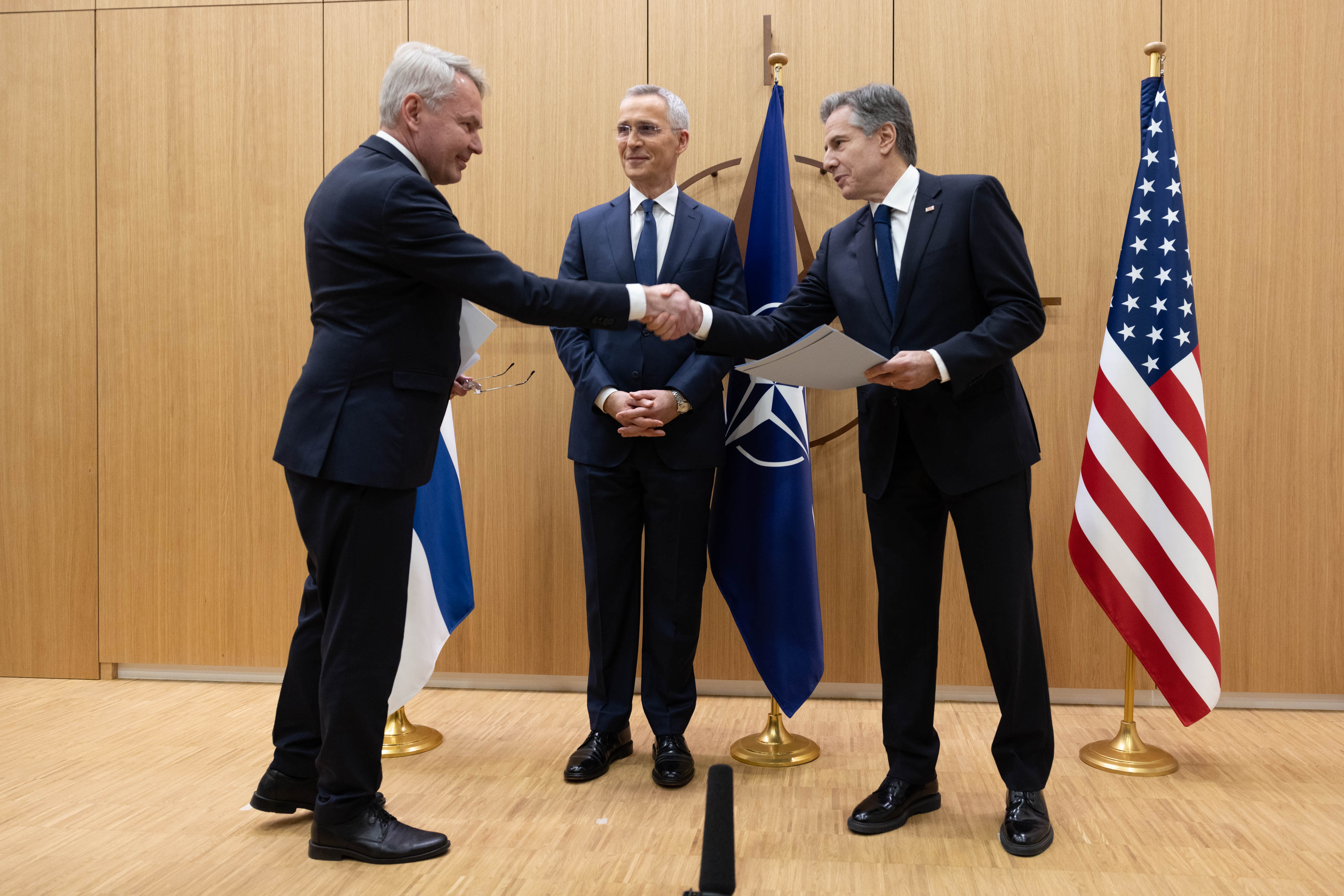
US Secretary of State Blinken exchanges instruments of ratification with Finland at NATO Headquarters. At the same time all NATO Articles entered into force in Finland

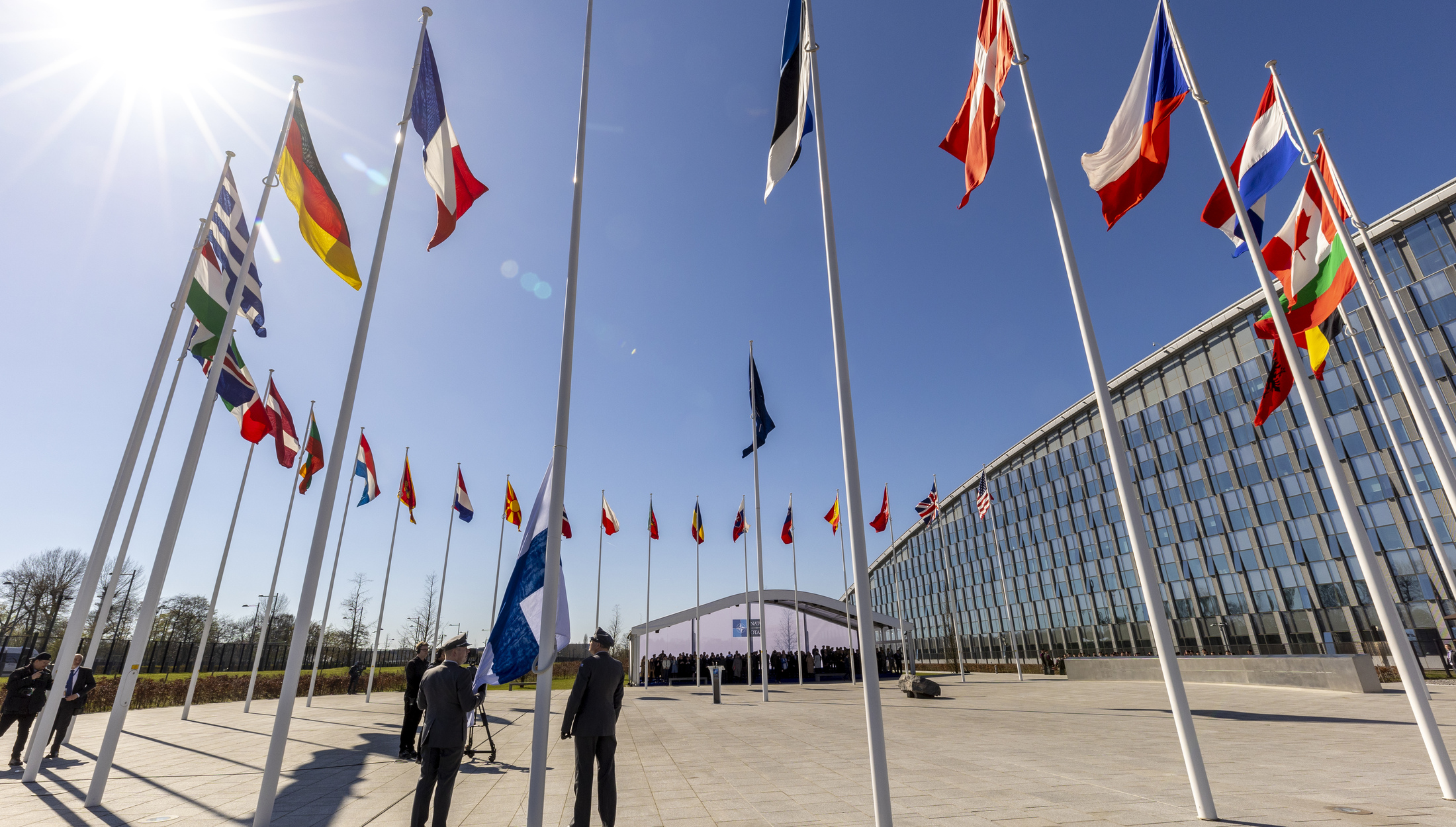
The flag of Finland is raised at NATO headquarters in Brussels on 4 April 2023.

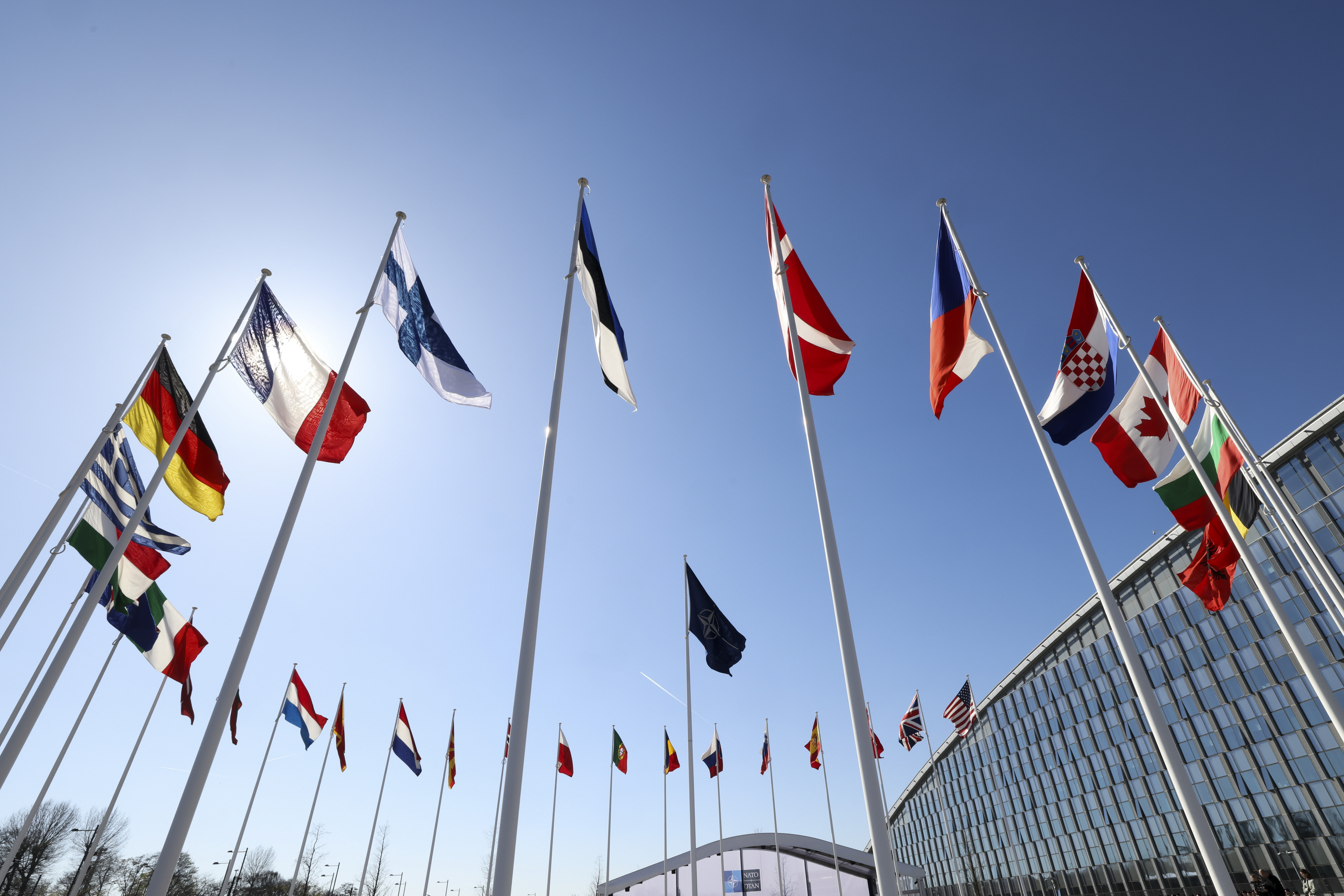
The Finnish flag flying alongside the flags of other NATO members at NATO headquarters.

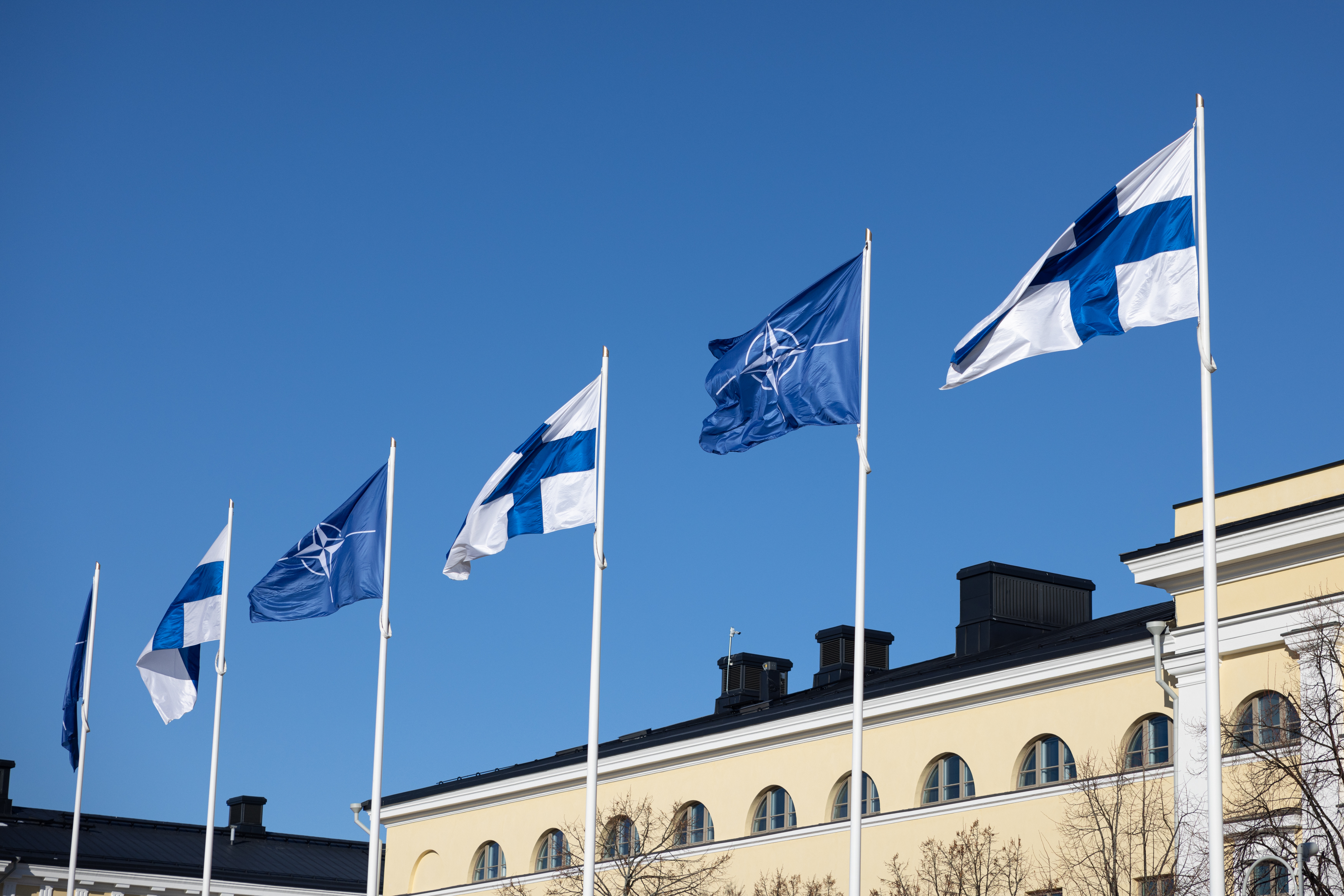
Finnish and NATO flags flying at the Ministry for Foreign Affairs of Finland on the day of accession, 4 April 2023

== Finland's foreign relations with other NATO member states ==
- Albania
- Belgium
- Bulgaria
- Canada
- Croatia
- Czech Republic
- Denmark
- Estonia
- France
- Germany
- Greece
- Hungary
- Iceland
- Italy
- Latvia
- Lithuania
- Luxembourg
- Montenegro
- Netherlands
- North Macedonia
- Norway
- Poland
- Portugal
- Romania
- Slovakia
- Slovenia
- Spain
- Sweden
- Turkey
- United Kingdom
- United States

== See also ==
- Foreign relations of Finland
- Foreign relations of NATO
- Finlandization
- Enlargement of NATO
- NATO open door policy
- European Union–NATO relations
- Finland–Russia relations
- Sweden–NATO relations
- Joint Expeditionary Force

== Bibliography ==
- Koivula, Tommi; Puranen, Matti; Seppo, Antti, eds. (2026). Finland in NATO: Perspectives on Strategy. Routledge. ISBN 9781003644569.
- Grenfell, Julian; Jopling, Thomas Michael (2008). FRONTEX: the EU external borders agency, 9th report of session 2007–08. House of Lords Stationery Office. ISBN 978-0-10-401232-1.
- Ministry for Foreign Affairs (Finland) (13 April 2022). Government report on changes in the security environment (Report). ISBN 978-952-383-811-6. ISSN 2490-0966.
