= Brazil–Finland relations =

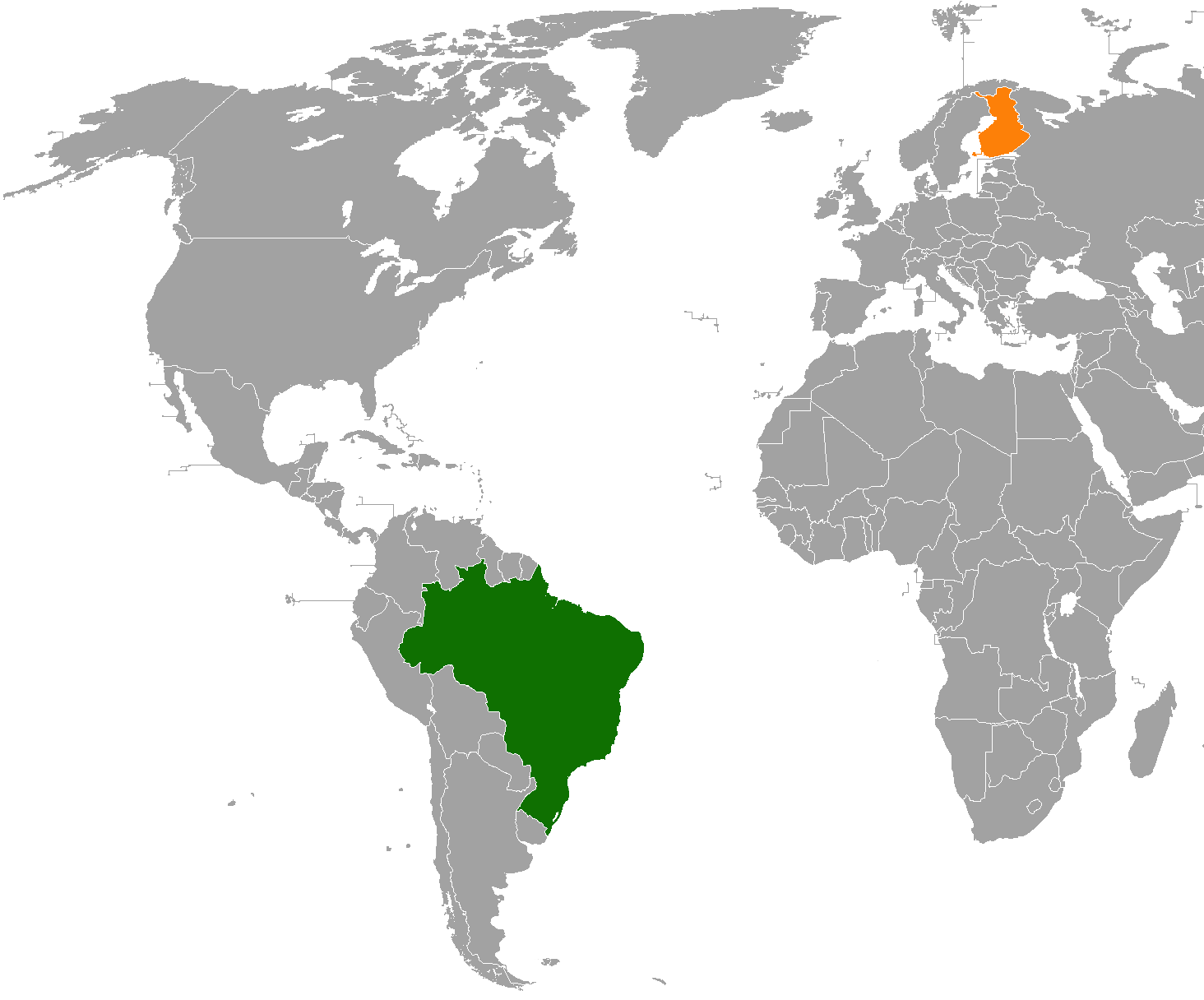
- Brazil: Finland

Brazil–Finland relations are the diplomatic relations between Brazil and Finland.

== History ==
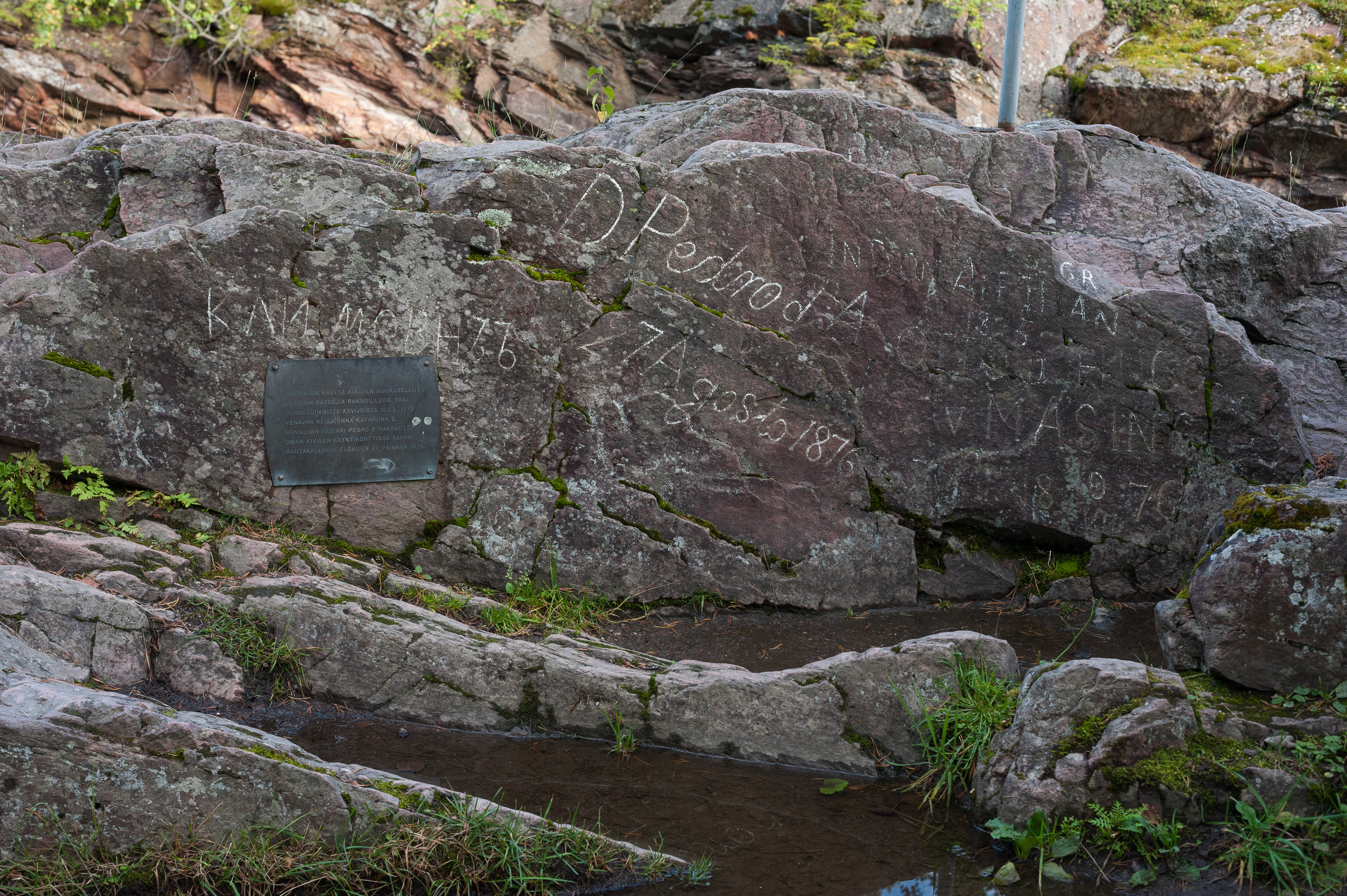
Engraved name of Emperor Pedro II of Brazil while visiting Imatrankoski; 1876.

In 1876, during his second tour of Europe, Emperor Pedro II of Brazil paid a visit to Finland and visited the water rapids in Imatrankoski. In December 1919, Brazil recognized Finland's independence, which had been declared two years earlier from Russia. A few months later, Brazil opened a consulate in Helsinki. In 1929, diplomatic relations were formally established between both nations. That same year, a Finnish "utopian" colony was founded with 300 settlers in the Brazilian town of Penedo, Itatiaia. The colony lasted only until 1940. In 1937, the first Finnish diplomatic legation was opened in Rio de Janeiro. During the Winter War between Finland and the Soviet Union; Brazil shipped over 10,000 sacs of coffee to Finland.

In February 1997, President Martti Ahtisaari became the first Finnish head-of-state to pay a visit to Brazil and brought with him a high-level delegation representing the most important Finnish companies wishing to expand their operations in Brazil. In 2007, President Luiz Inácio Lula da Silva became the first Brazilian President to visit Finland. There have since been numerous visits and reunions between leaders of both nations.

Since the initial visits, relations between Finland and Brazil have become closer. In 2017, more than 54 Finnish companies operated in Brazil and invested over €72 million Euros. Brazilian multinational company Embraer has built and sold airplanes for Finnair. In November 2017, Finland opened a consulate in São Paulo. That same year, in December 2017, Brazilian diplomats participated in the celebrations of the centenary of Finnish independence. As a gesture, Rio de Janeiro illuminated the Christ the Redeemer statue and other monuments and public buildings in Finnish national colors.

In December 2019, both nations celebrated 100 years of diplomatic relations.

== High-level visits ==
High-level visits from Brazil to Finland

- Emperor Pedro II of Brazil (1876)
- Vice President Marco Maciel (2002)
- President Luiz Inácio Lula da Silva (2007)
- President Dilma Rousseff (2015)

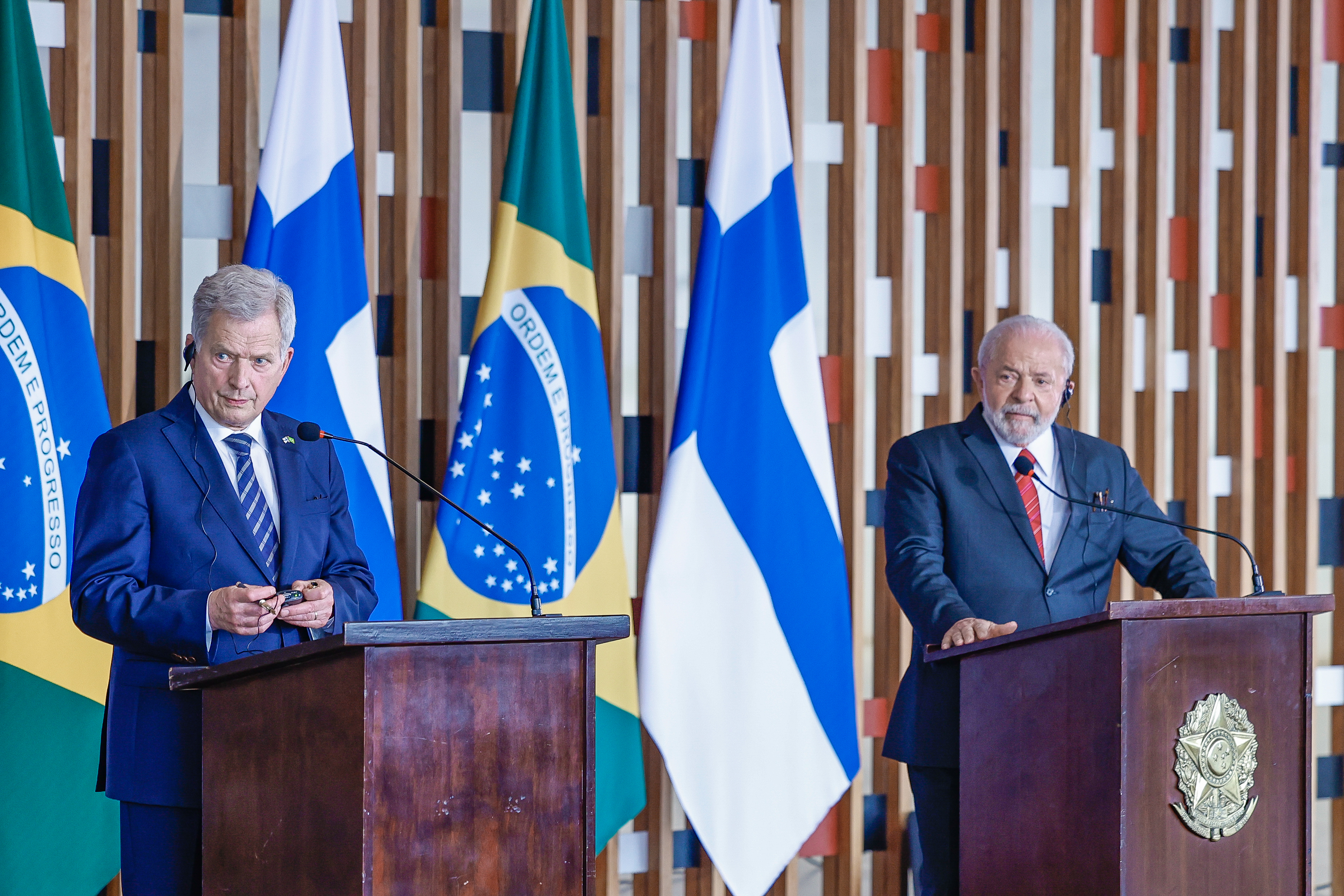
Presidents Sauli Niinistö and Luiz Inácio Lula da Silva in 2023

High-level visits from Finland to Brazil

- Foreign Minister Pär Stenbäck (1983)
- Prime Minister Kalevi Sorsa (1986)
- Foreign Minister Tarja Halonen (1996)
- President Martti Ahtisaari (1997)
- President Tarja Halonen (2003, 2006)
- Prime Minister Matti Vanhanen (2008)
- Prime Minister Jyrki Katainen (2012)
- President Sauli Niinistö (2016)
- Foreign Minister Timo Soini (2016)
- President Sauli Niinistö (2023)

== Bilateral agreements ==
Both nations have signed a few agreements such an Agreement to Avoid Double Taxation and Prevent Tax Evasion in Matters of Income Taxes (1997); Memorandum of Understanding in the areas of Research, Logistical Support and Acquisition of Defense products and services (2015) and a Memorandum of Understanding for Air Transportation (2018).

== Resident diplomatic missions ==
- Brazil has an embassy in Helsinki.
- Finland has an embassy in Brasília and a consulate in São Paulo.
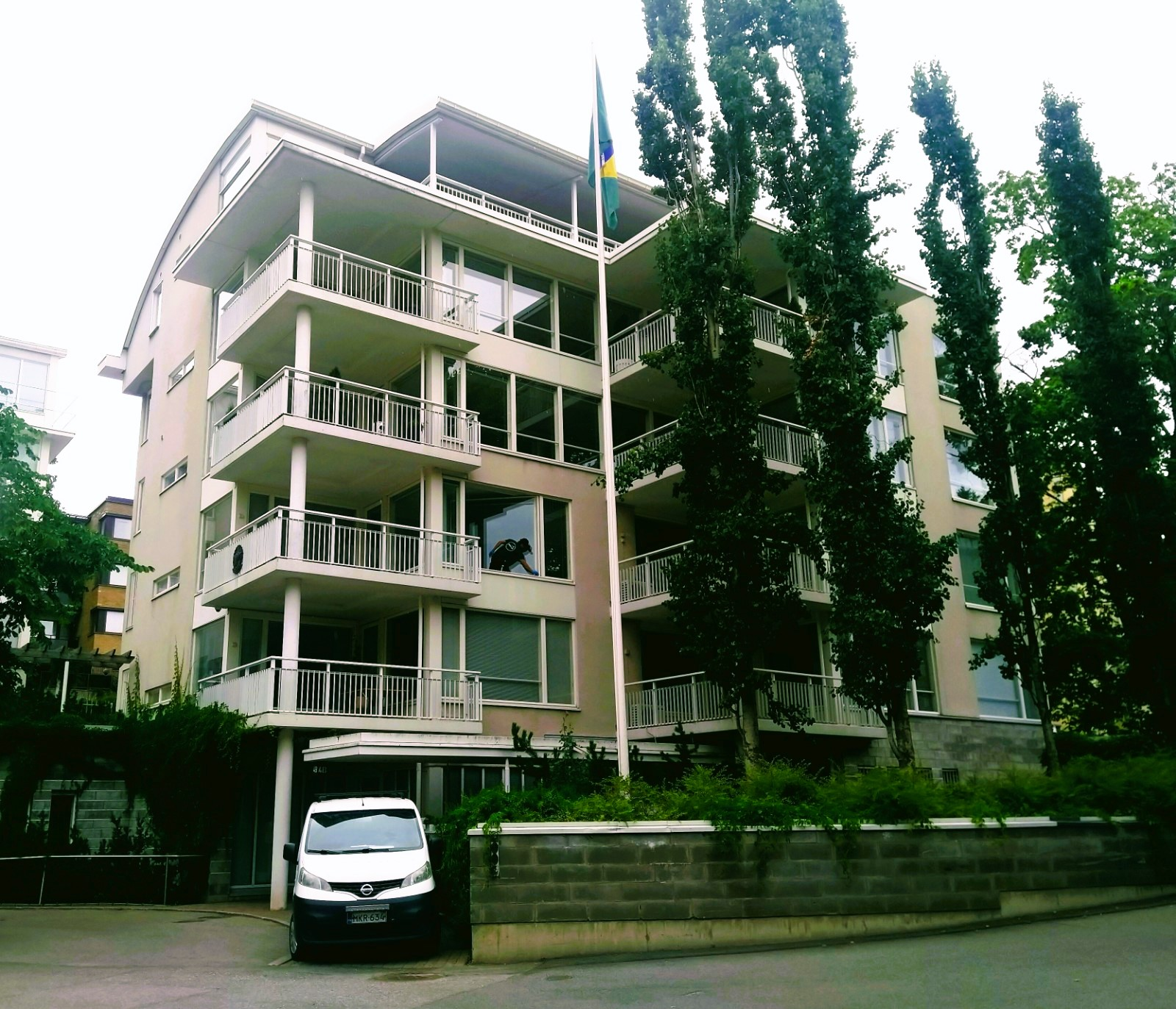
Building hosting the Embassy of Brazil in Helsinki

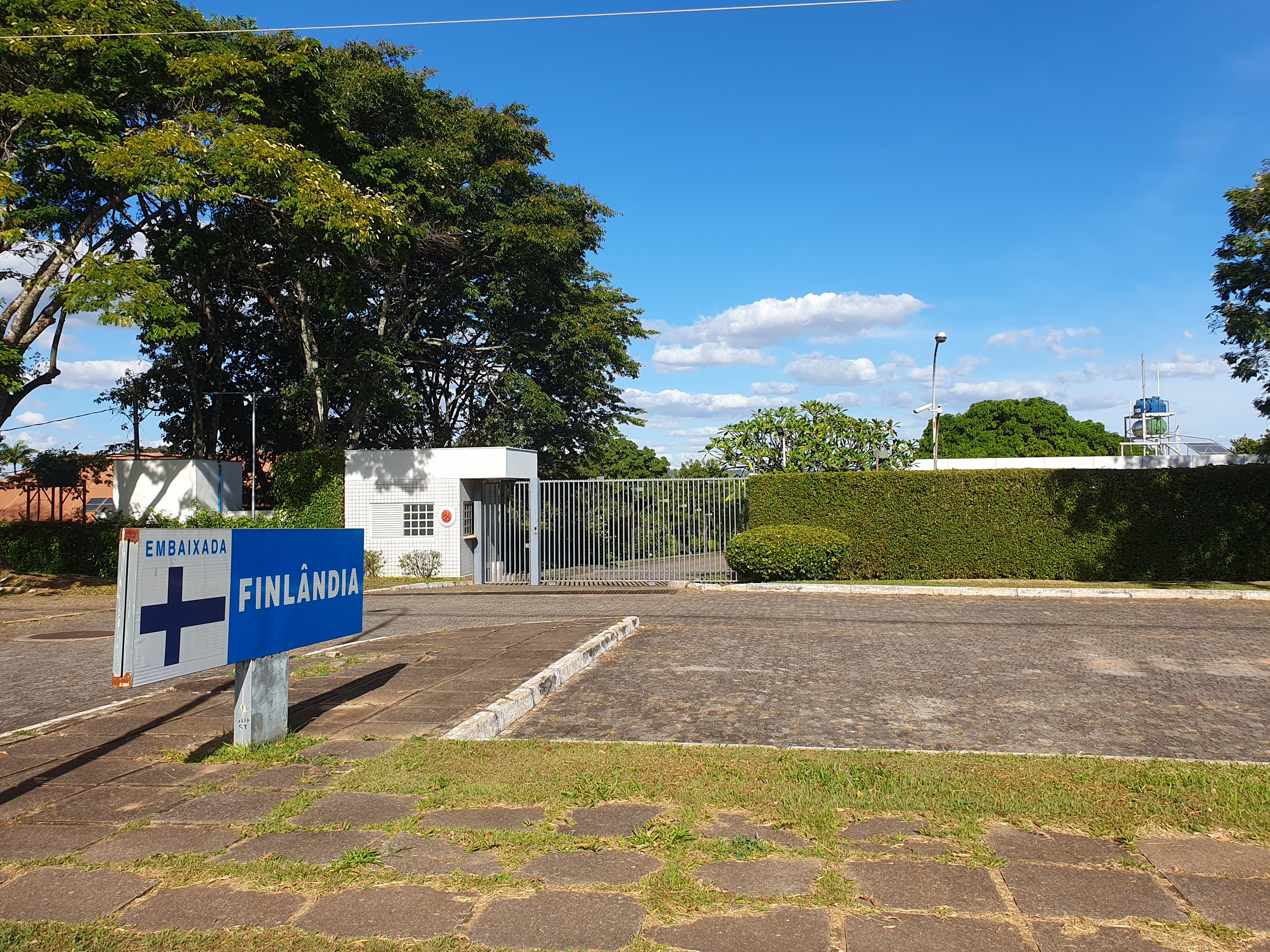
Embassy of Finland in Brasília

== See also ==
- Foreign relations of Brazil
- Foreign relations of Finland
- Latin American migration to Finland
