= Foreign relations of Finland =

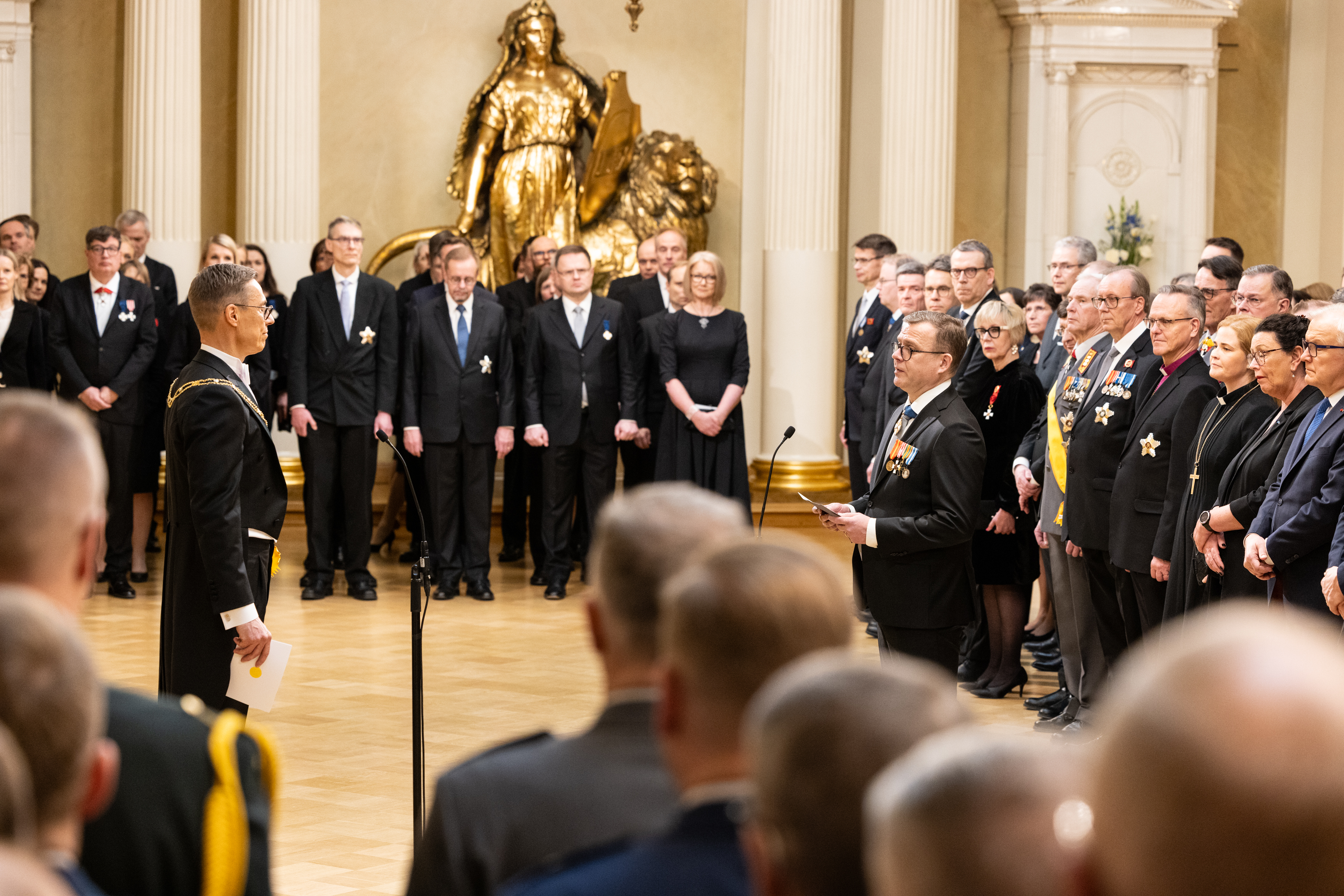
Inauguration of the President of the Republic of Finland at the Presidential Palace in 2024. On the left, the new President of the Republic, Alexander Stubb. On the right, Prime Minister Petteri Orpo.

The foreign relations of Finland are the responsibility of the president of Finland, who leads foreign policy in cooperation with the government. Implicitly the government is responsible for internal policy and decision making in the European Union. Within the government, preparative discussions are conducted in the government committee of foreign and security policy (ulko- ja turvallisuuspoliittinen ministerivaliokunta), which includes the Prime Minister and at least the Minister of Foreign Affairs and the Minister of Defence, and at most four other ministers as necessary. The committee meets with the President as necessary. Laws concerning foreign relations are discussed in the parliamentary committee of foreign relations (ulkoasiainvaliokunta, utrikesutskottet). The Ministry of Foreign Affairs implements the foreign policy.

== History ==
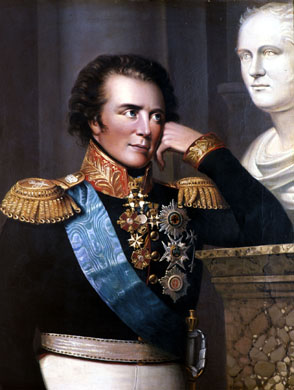
Count Gustaf Mauritz Armfelt.

=== Early independence ===
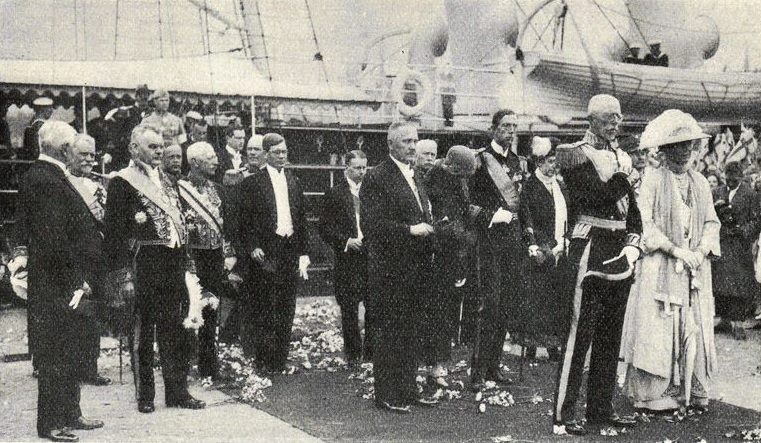
The Swedish royal couple is welcomed to Helsinki. Behind the royal couple president Lauri Kristian Relander with wife as well as Prince Wilhelm.

In March 1917, Tsar Nicholas II of Russia abdicated the throne, which led to the collapse of the Russian Empire and left the Grand Duchy of Finland without a grand duke. Following the Bolshevik Revolution in November, Finland declared independence in December 1917. Soviet Russia was the first to recognize Finland on 4 January 1918, followed shortly by Sweden, France, and Germany.

In late January 1918, Finnish socialists launched a civil war with the support of Russian Bolsheviks. The anti-communist Whites, in turn, were supported by the German Empire. German assistance initially took the form of arms shipments and the deployment of Finnish Jägers trained in Germany. During the Finnish Civil War, Russia and Germany concluded the Treaty of Brest-Litovsk, under which most of the Russian troops withdrew from Finland, leaving the Finnish Reds without support. Already in February, Finland's ambassador to Berlin, Edvard Hjelt, had formally requested German military intervention. In April, the German Baltic Sea Division landed at Hanko and took Helsinki from the Red Guards.

To secure German assistance, Finland and Germany had signed a peace treaty accompanied by a trade agreement that granted significant benefits for German industry. A secret supplementary protocol authorized German forces to establish bases in Finland and to operate through Finnish territory to the Arctic Ocean. After the White victory, a plan to establish a Finnish monarchy was set in motion, and Prince Frederick Charles of Hesse, brother-in-law of German Emperor Wilhelm II, was chosen as king-elect. Finland's pro-German policy and the election of a German king led to France to cut diplomatic relations with Finland, and prompted the United States and Great Britain to withhold recognition. U.S. Secretary of State Robert Lansing considered Finland a German-occupied country.

However, Germany's defeat in the World War I and the abdication of Wilhelm II also put an end to Finland's monarchy project and forced a reorientation of its foreign policy. German forces withdrew from Finland following the Armistice of 11 November 1918. General Baron Carl Gustaf Emil Mannerheim, who had opposed the pro-German orientation, assumed the position of Regent of Finland. Mannerheim advocated the entente cordiale, supporting alignment with Franco–British relations. A republican constitution was adopted in Finland in 1919, and the Allied powers agreed to recognize Finland following the Paris Peace Conference.

=== Between the world wars ===
Relations with Soviet Russia from 1918 to 1939 were icy; voluntary expeditions to Russia called heimosodat ended only in 1922, four years after the conclusion of the Finnish Civil War. However, attempts to establish military alliances were unsuccessful.

=== World War II ===
Risto Ryti and Marshal Mannerheim

By 1940, Finland and Sweden considered forming a political union, but Nazi Germany and the Soviet Union obstructed these plans. The Soviet Union had not relinquished its strategic objective of bringing Finland under its control. Finland's only remaining option was partnership with Germany. Germany, for its part, was interested in cooperation with Finland due to the presence of nickel deposits in Lapland, a raw material of vital importance for the production of defence equipment.

Later, during the Continuation War, Finland declared "co-belligerency" with Nazi Germany, and allowed Northern Finland to be used as a German attack base. For 872 days, the German army, aided indirectly by Finnish forces, besieged Leningrad, the Soviet Union's second-largest city. The peace settlement in 1944 with the Soviet Union led to the Lapland War in 1945, where Finland fought Germans in northern Finland.

=== During the Cold War ===
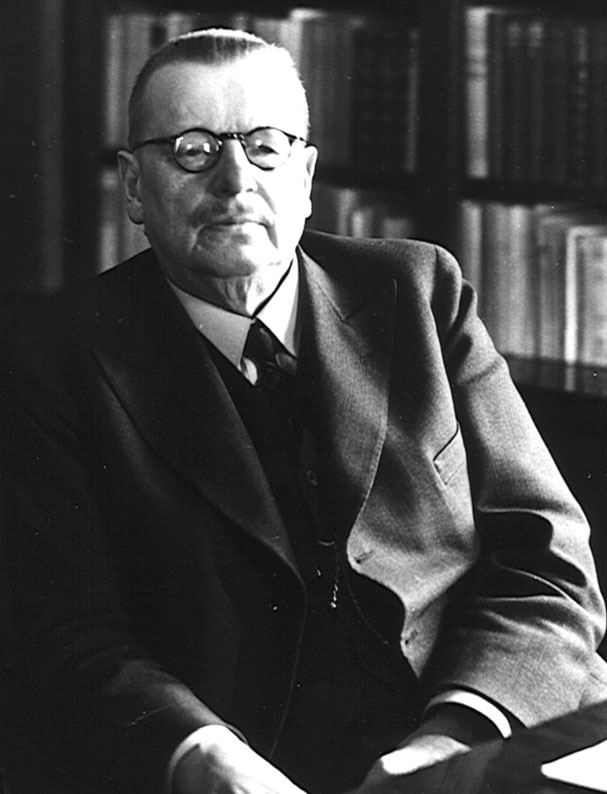
After the Second World War, President Juho Kusti Paasikivi, was remembered as the main architect of Finland's foreign policy.

Finland did not join the Soviet Union's economic sphere (Comecon) but remained a free-market economy and conducted bilateral trade with the Soviet Union.

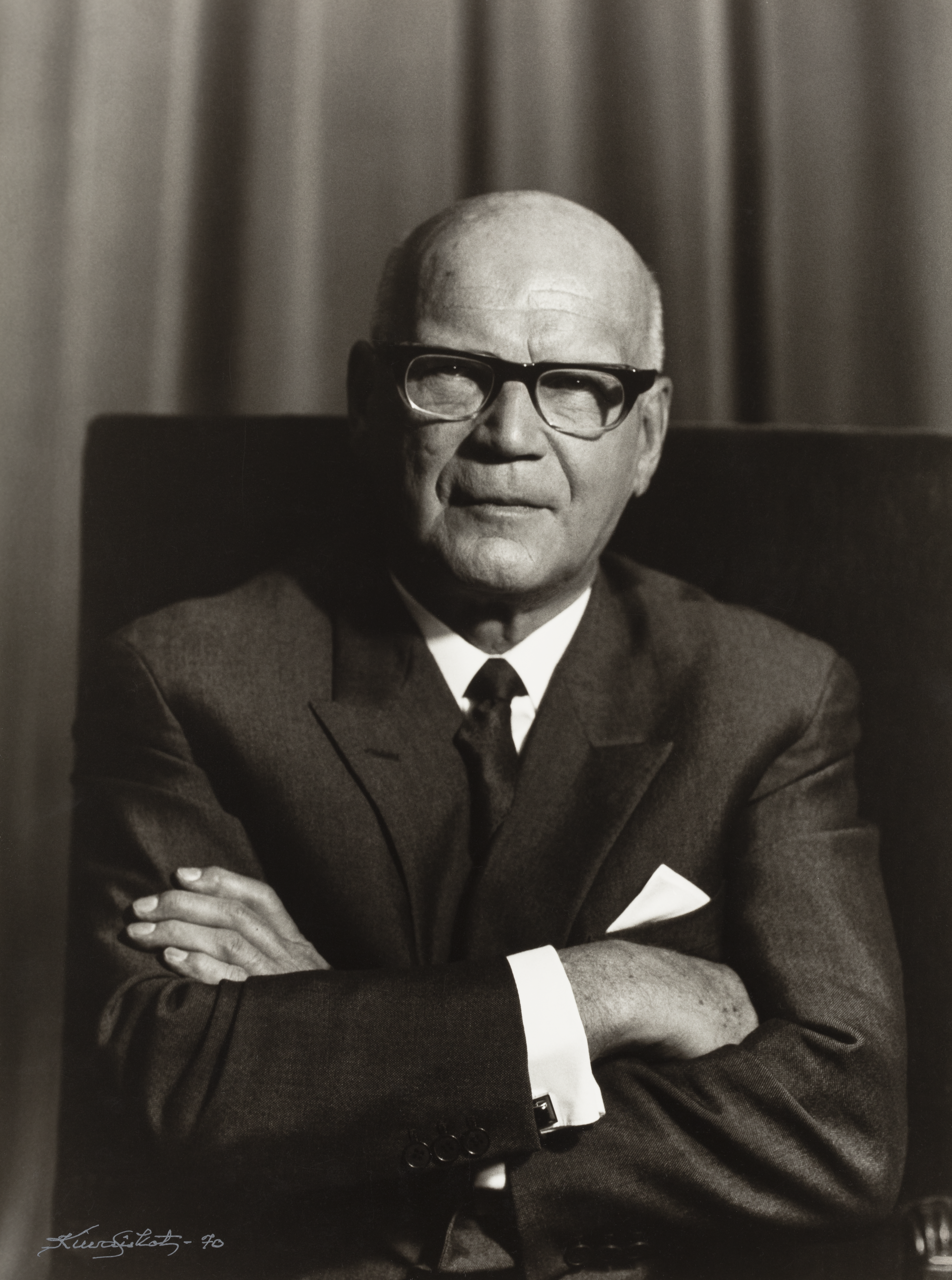
President Urho Kekkonen is the longest-serving president in the history of Finland.

The participating states signed a treaty that guaranteed the free movement of people and information. This provision became a catalyst for demands for human rights within the Eastern Bloc. The CSCE conference thus played a role in undermining the Iron Curtain. Hosting the CSCE was, moreover, an acknowledgement of Finland's neutrality.

The President of the United States Ronald Reagan conducted a three-day state visit to Finland in 1988, hosted by President Mauno Koivisto. This visit symbolised the diplomatic relations between the two nations during the late Cold War period.

In 1990, the Helsinki Summit took place in Finland between U.S. President George H.W. Bush and Soviet General Secretary Mikhail Gorbachev. The agenda of the summit prominently featured the issue of Iraq's invasion of Kuwait, which had precipitated international tensions.

=== Dissolution of the Soviet Union ===
After the dissolution of the Soviet Union in 1991, Finland unilaterally abrogated the last restrictions imposed on it by the Paris peace treaties of 1947 and the Finno-Soviet Agreement of Friendship, Cooperation, and Mutual Assistance. The government filed an application for membership in the European Union (EU) three months after the dissolution of the Soviet Union.

Finland officially established its relations with NATO in 1992 when it participated as an observer in the North Atlantic Cooperation Council (NACC) foreign ministers’ meeting. This marked the beginning of Finland's engagement with NATO cooperation mechanisms following the end of the Cold War, motivated primarily by the need to monitor security developments in neighboring Russia and the Baltic states. Negotiations to join NATO's Partnership for Peace (PfP) were initiated in 1993, and Finland formally joined the PfP program in 1994. Initially, Finland's cooperation with NATO was restricted to non-combat areas such as rescue operations, peacekeeping training, and environmental protection.

In November 1995, Finland's Parliament was presented with a new peacekeeping law that facilitated broader participation in international peace operations. This legal framework enabled Finland's full engagement in the Bosnia IFOR peacekeeping mission in 1996 as a full and active peace partner.

Concurrently, efforts to align the Finnish Defence Forces' compatibility with NATO military standards were formalized through agreements signed in 1995. Further integration steps included the establishment of a special Finnish mission to NATO headquarters in Brussels in 1997, enhancing Finland's involvement in NATO decision-making processes while maintaining its policy of military non-alignment.

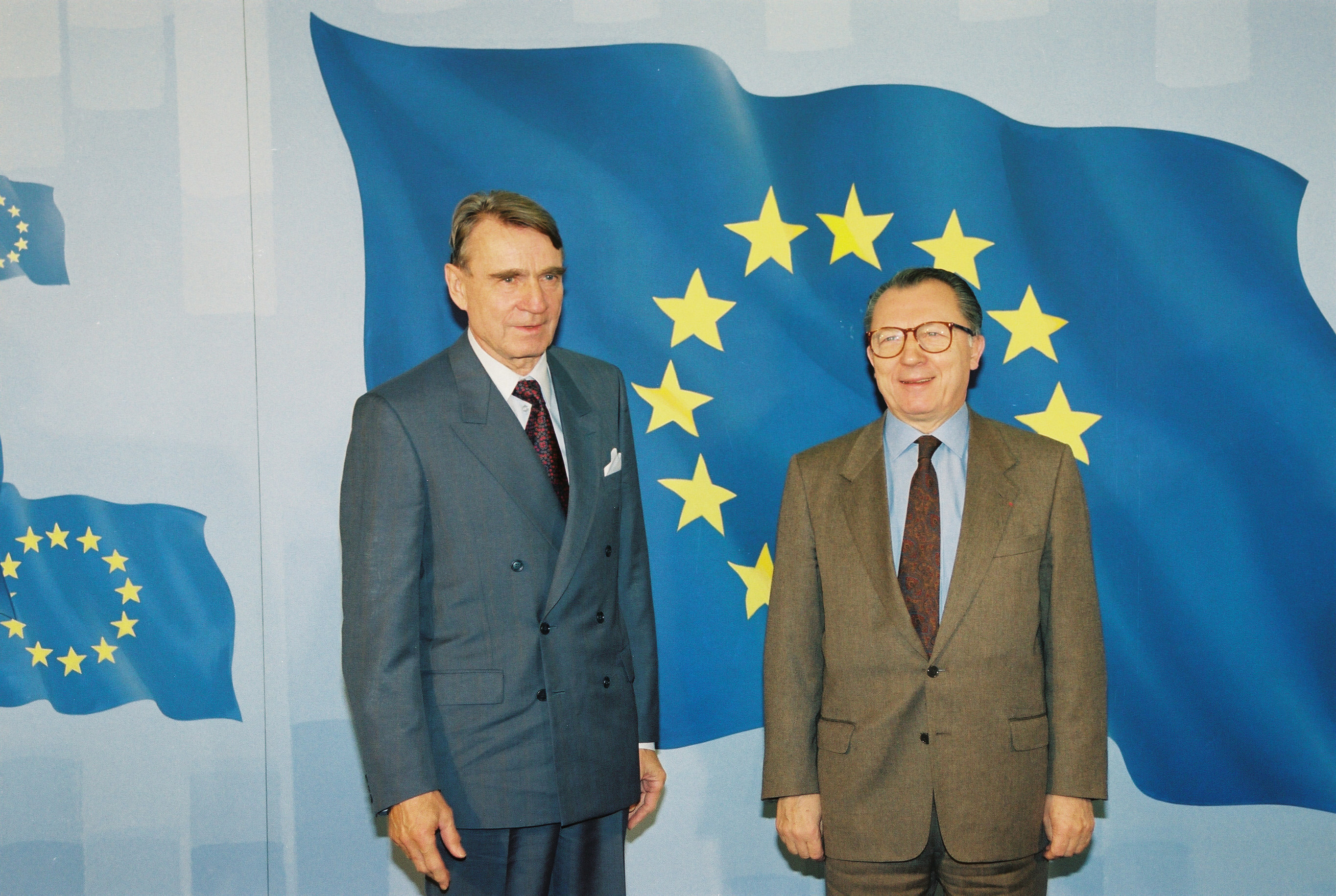
President Mauno Koivisto with Jacques Delors, President of the CEC.

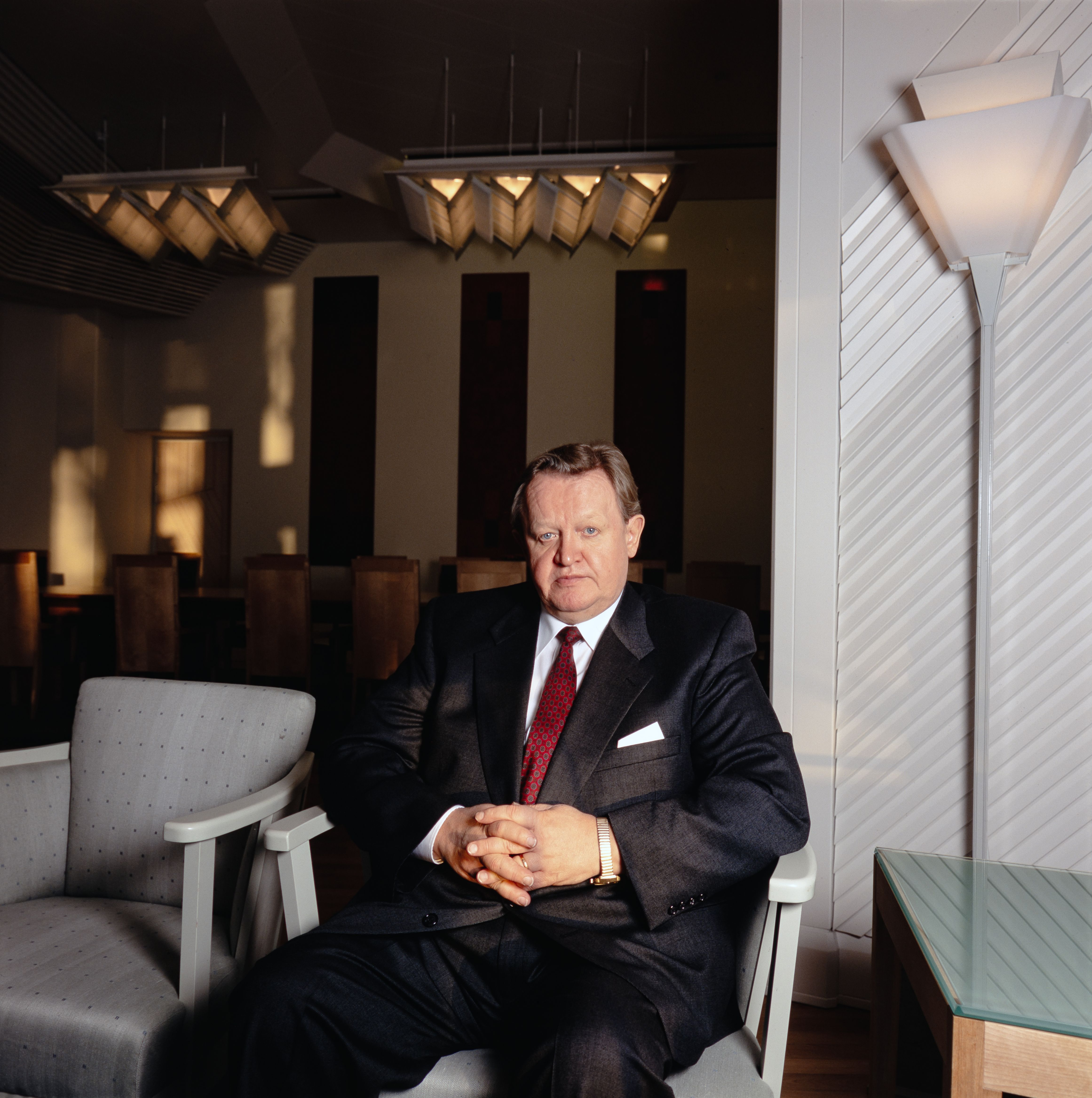
Nobel Peace Prize laureate, President Martti Ahtisaari.

The Northern Dimension was conceived to manage the interdependencies between the EU and Russia, focusing on sectors such as environmental issues, nuclear safety, and the socio-economic development of border regions, including Kaliningrad. Finland's geographic and political position made it a key driver of this policy, leveraging its EU membership since 1995 to facilitate a cooperative framework with Russia rather than antagonism.

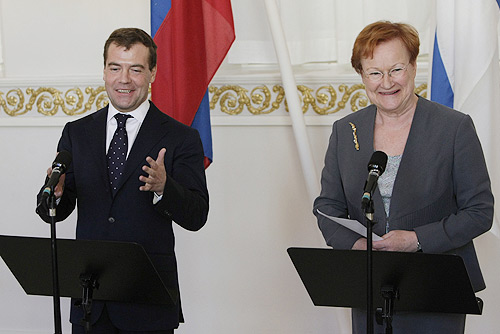
President Dmitry Medvedev and President Tarja Halonen in Helsinki in 2009.

During the 1990s, Finnish exports to Russia recovered gradually after the collapse of the Soviet Union and the severe trade disruptions that followed. The economic situation in Russia came to stabilize during the 2000s, resulting in increased bilateral trade. By 2008, Russia had regained its status as Finland's largest export market, fuelled not only by industrial goods but also by the growing presence of Russian consumers who contributed to Finland's economic vitality.

In 2005, the number of foreign spies in Finland returned to Cold War levels. Espionage activity was concentrated in the Helsinki metropolitan area, where the nation's political leadership, largest corporations, and principal research institutions are located. The capital also hosts foreign embassies, through which, according to experts, the majority of espionage is conducted. According to information published by Helsingin Sanomat, approximately 50 trained spies representing the intelligence services of various countries were then operating in Finland. Most of them were based within the area of Ring Road III, posing as diplomats, journalists, researchers, businesspeople, grant holders, or students. Of these, an estimated 30 focused on civilian intelligence, while 20 concentrated on gathering military-related information.

=== Change in constitution ===
In 2000, a major reform was made to the Constitution of Finland, which repealed the previously valid four separate constitutional laws and created a unified, modernised Constitution. This reform particularly signified a significant shift in the leadership of foreign policy.

According to the Constitution of 2000, foreign policy is led by the President of the Republic in cooperation with the Council of State (the government). This means that the President's power in foreign affairs is no longer exclusive but emphasizes collaboration with the government. Additionally, due to EU membership, the leadership of foreign policy was divided: the Council of State was given decision-making authority in preparing EU affairs and national measures, while the President retained responsibility for traditional foreign policy outside the EU. In practice, this transferred much power from the President to the Prime Minister and the government, while also increasing the role of Parliament.

With this change, the President's power in domestic politics was significantly reduced, and the Prime Minister became the key decision-maker in forming the government and leading the EU aspect of foreign policy. Except in times of crisis, the Constitution of 2000 emphasized cooperation and the President's role is focused on foreign and security policy, but with more limited supervision and authority than before.

The Constitution of 2000 strengthened parliamentarism and transformed the President's position into a dual leadership in foreign policy: the President and the Council of State lead foreign policy together, with the Council of State and Prime Minister having a strong role in EU matters. This pushed Finland toward a more modern, parliamentary system of leadership in foreign policy. The arrangement has been criticised for not providing a simple answer of who's in charge if there is a major dispute.

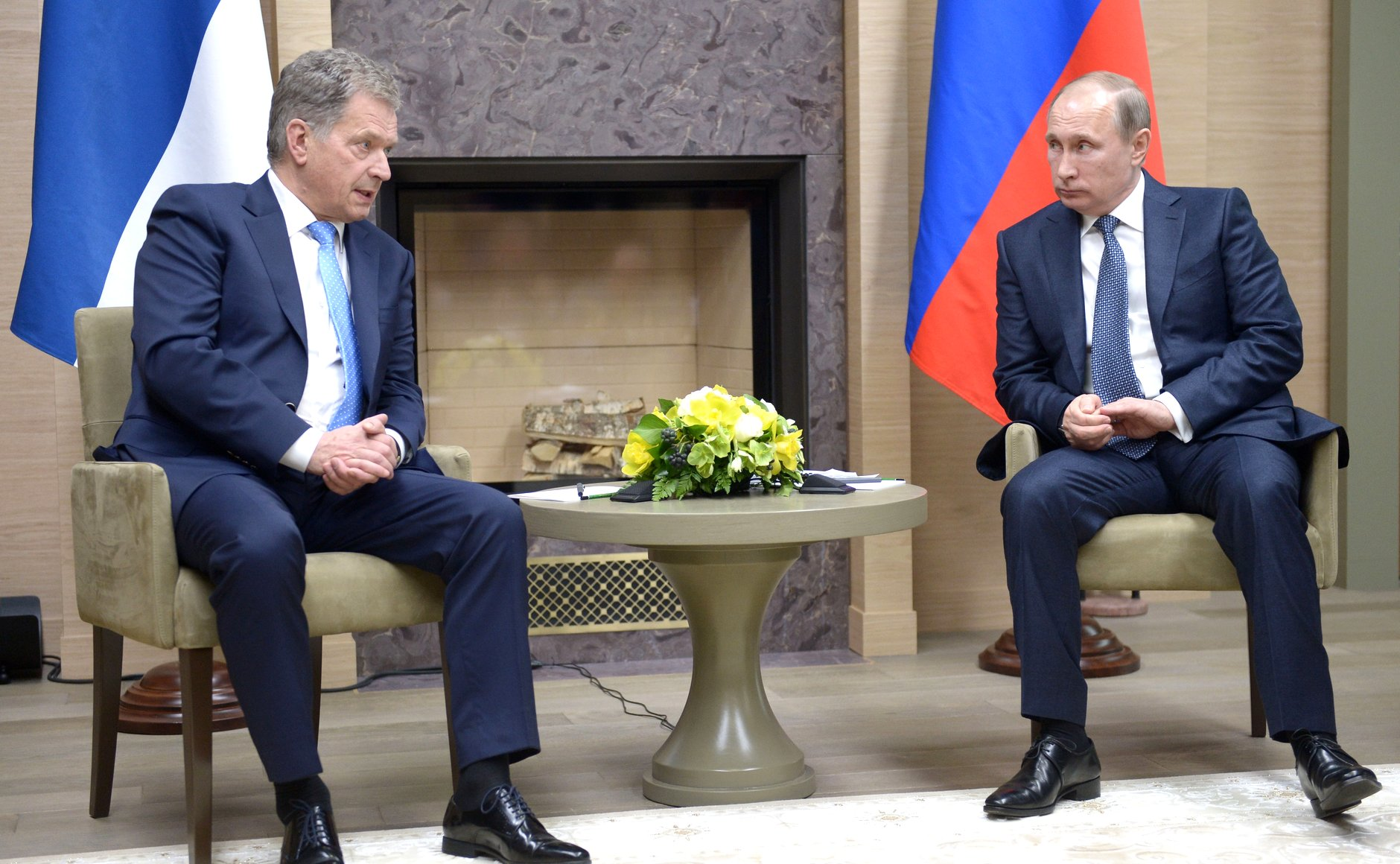
Finnish President Sauli Niinistö with Russian President Vladimir Putin in 2016.

=== Russian invasion of Ukraine ===
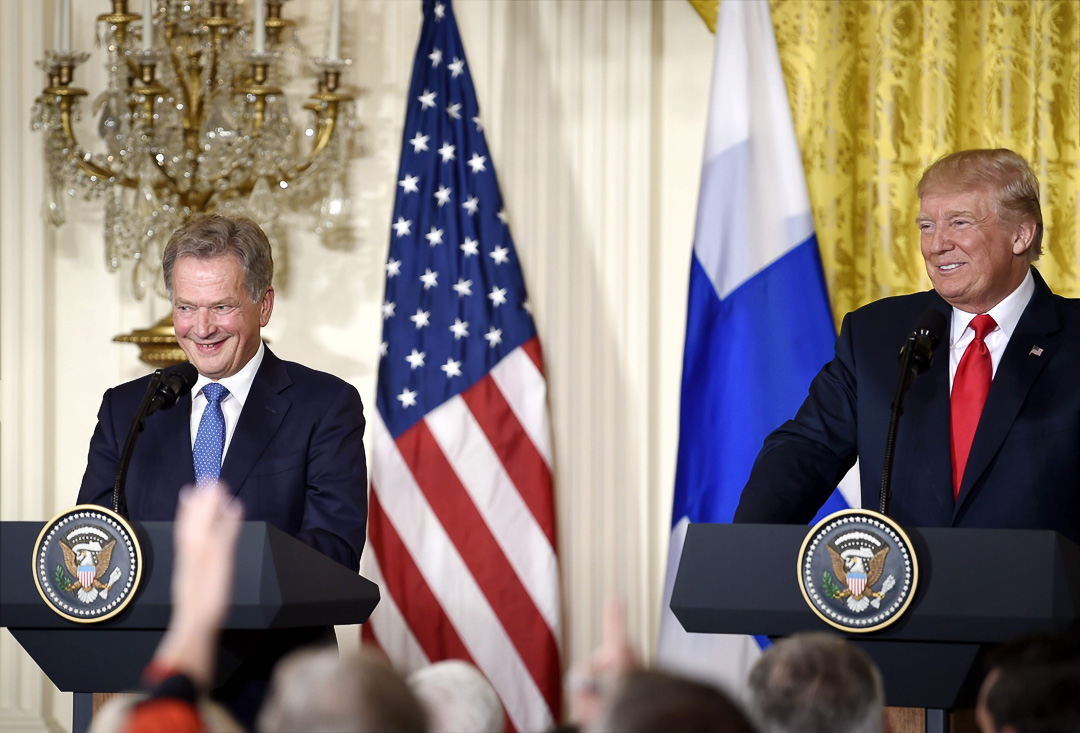
President Niinistö with US President Donald Trump in 2017.

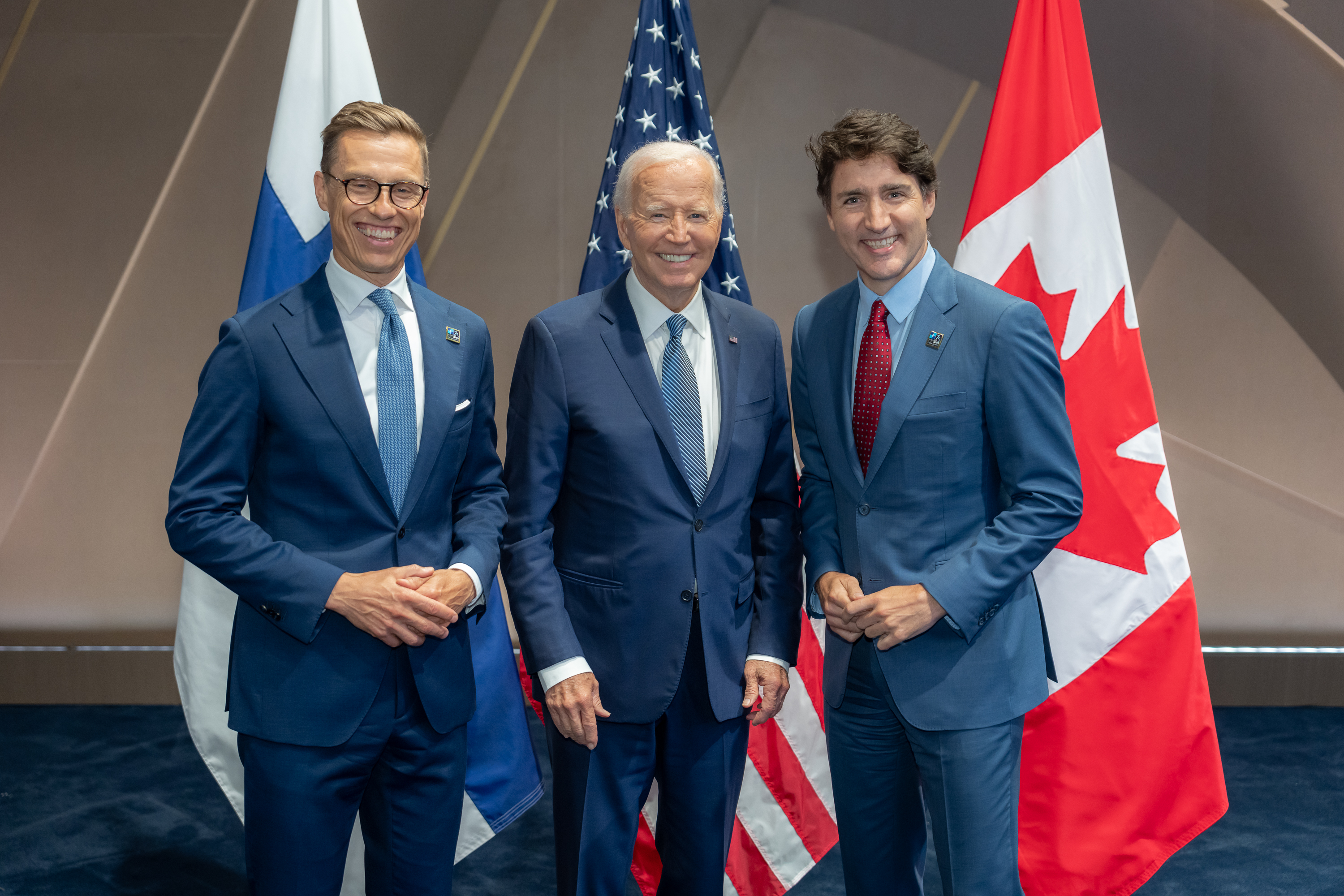
President Alexander Stubb with President Joe Biden, and Prime Minister Justin Trudeau after a meeting of the North Atlantic Council, during the NATO Summit.

Following Russia's invasion of Ukraine in February 2022, Finland applied for NATO membership in May of that year, ending decades of military non-alignment. Finland joined NATO in April 2023. The decision was driven by an increased perception of threat from Russia, which undermined the credibility of bilateral security assurances. Concurrently, Finland intensified its defence cooperation with Ukraine by supplying defence materiel packages and signing cooperation agreements to deepen military collaboration. Finland has emerged as one of Ukraine's largest supporters by GDP ratio.

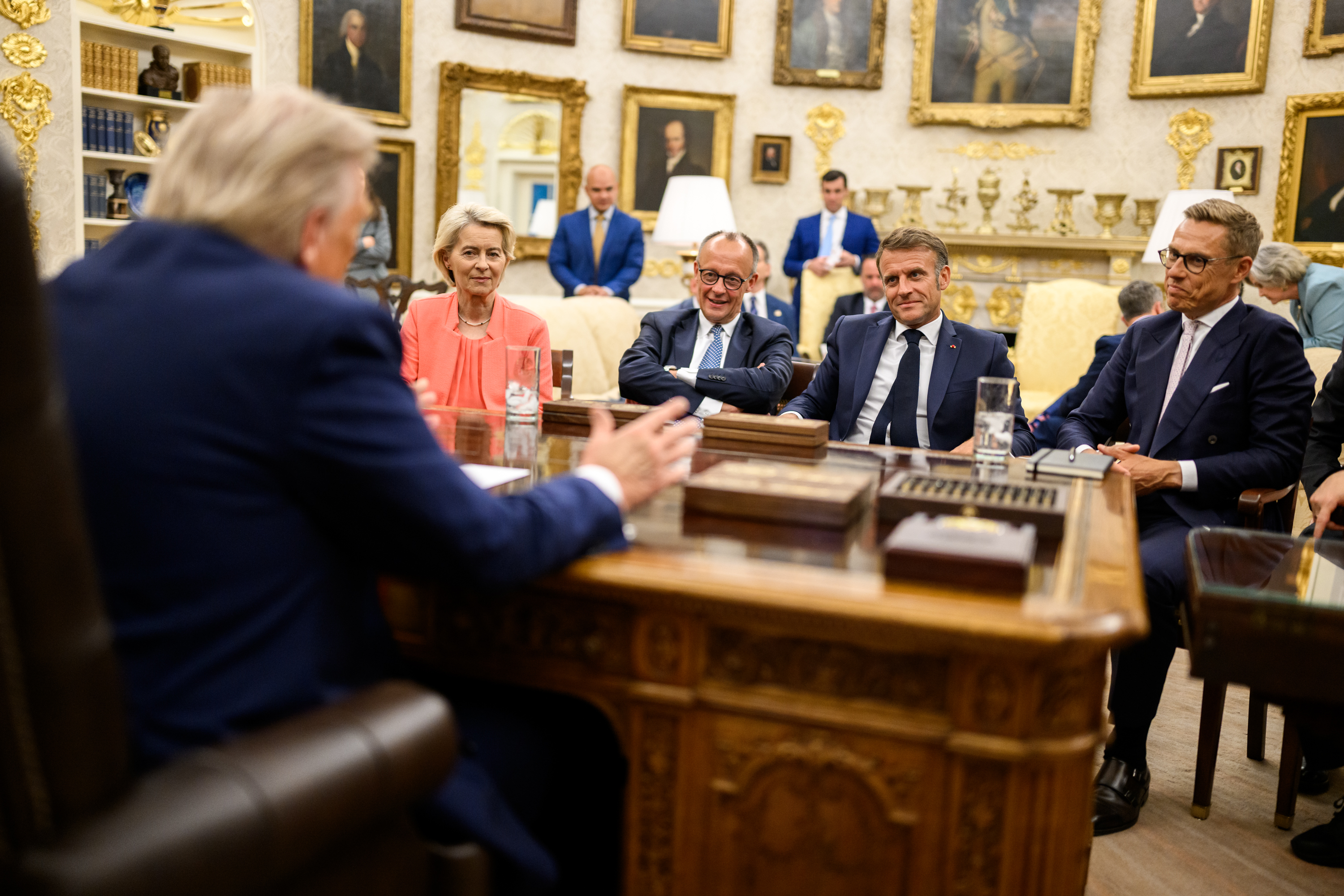
President Donald Trump meets with U.K. Prime Minister Keir Starmer, Italian Prime Minister Giorgia Meloni, European Commission President Ursula von der Leyen, German Chancellor Friedrich Merz, French President Emmanuel Macron, Finnish President Alexander Stubb, Ukrainian President Volodymyr Zelenskyy, and NATO Secretary General Mark Rutte after his call with Russian President Vladimir Putin, Monday, August 18, 2025, in the Oval Office.

== Multilateral relations ==
Since 1917, Finland has joined numerous multilateral organizations. Key ones include:

- League of Nations (1920)
- Bank for International Settlements (1930)
- International Monetary Fund (IMF) (1948)
- International Bank for Reconstruction and Development (World Bank) (1948)
- General Agreement on Tariffs and Trade (GATT) (1950)
- United Nations (UN) (1955)
- Nordic Council (1955)
- International Finance Corporation (1956)
- International Development Association (1960)
- European Free Trade Association (EFTA) (1961, until 1994)
- Asian Development Bank (1966)
- Organization for Economic Cooperation and Development (OECD) (1969)
- Organization for Security and Cooperation in Europe (OSCE) (1973)
- Inter-American Development Bank (1977)
- African Development Bank (1982)
- Multilateral Investment Guarantee Agency (1988)
- Council of Europe (1989)
- European Bank for Reconstruction and Development (EBRD) (1991)
- World Trade Organization (WTO) (1995)
- European Union (EU) (1995)
- Schengen Area (2001)
- INTELSAT (1999)
- NATO Partnership for Peace (1994) and full NATO membership (2023)

== NATO ==
Finland's relationship with NATO began to strengthen immediately after the dissolution of the Soviet Union in the early 1990s, when Finland joined the North Atlantic Cooperation Council (NACC) as an observer in 1992, established for former Warsaw Pact members. Finland started to move closer to NATO by joining the Partnership for Peace (PfP) program in 1994, developing cooperation in defense matters while maintaining military non-alignment. From the 1990s onwards, Finland built increasingly closer ties with NATO, participating in international crisis management operations and signing a host nation support agreement with NATO in 2014, which defined the principles of assistance during crises and exercises.

Finland has participated in NATO's Partnership for Peace cooperation since 1994. Additionally, Finland became a member of the Euro-Atlantic Partnership Council (EAPC) in 1997. In 2014, Finland was invited as an advanced partner to join NATO's Enhanced Opportunities Partner (EOP) cooperation. Alongside its involvement in the Enhanced Opportunities cooperation, Finland also promoted trilateral cooperation between NATO, Finland, and Sweden, known as the "30+2" cooperation framework.

As the security environment changed, especially following Russia's invasion of Ukraine in early 2022, Finland's security policy situation became decisive. Finland decided to apply for NATO membership in May 2022. The Finnish Parliament strongly approved the membership, with opponents in the minority. Finland's NATO membership came into force on 4 April 2023, making Finland a full member and part of NATO's collective defense guarantees under Article 5.

This membership marked the end of Finland's long-standing military non-alignment and strengthened Finland's security in a changed European security landscape. Finland's membership also enhances stability and security in the Baltic Sea region and Northern Europe, with Finland actively participating in NATO's collective defense and decision-making.

== Diplomatic relations ==
=== List ===
List of countries which Finland maintains diplomatic relations with:

#	Country	Date
1	Sweden	10 January 1918
2	France	24 January 1918
3	Denmark	18 February 1918
4	United Kingdom	28 March 1918
5	Norway	6 April 1918
6	Argentina	11 May 1918
7	Bulgaria	19 July 1918
8	Netherlands	14 August 1918
9	Spain	16 August 1918
10	Greece	1 March 1919
11	Japan	24 May 1919
12	United States	30 May 1919
13	Belgium	9 July 1919
14	Italy	6 September 1919
15	Portugal	10 January 1920
16	Poland	7 February 1920
17	Romania	28 June 1920
18	Russia	31 December 1920
19	Luxembourg	25 October 1921
20	Czech Republic	18 December 1921
21	Egypt	8 April 1922
22	Hungary	12 April 1922
23	Austria	22 April 1922
24	Turkey	9 December 1924
25	Switzerland	26 January 1926
26	Cuba	5 April 1929
27	Brazil	8 April 1929
28	Serbia	7 August 1929
29	Afghanistan	15 December 1930
30	Chile	20 February 1931
31	Iran	12 December 1931
32	Uruguay	21 March 1935
33	Mexico	12 May 1937
—	Holy See	24 April 1942
34	Iceland	15 August 1947
35	Canada	21 November 1947
36	South Africa	15 May 1949
37	Australia	31 May 1949
38	India	10 September 1949
39	New Zealand	22 July 1950
40	China	28 October 1950
41	Israel	14 November 1950
42	Pakistan	12 January 1951
43	Syria	22 May 1953
44	Colombia	26 March 1954
45	Venezuela	31 March 1954
46	Thailand	17 June 1954
47	Myanmar	21 June 1954
48	Indonesia	1 September 1954
49	Sri Lanka	24 September 1954
50	Philippines	14 July 1955
51	Lebanon	21 June 1956
52	Albania	8 June 1956
53	Iraq	15 May 1959
54	Ethiopia	17 July 1959
55	Morocco	17 July 1959
56	Tunisia	17 July 1959
57	Jordan	28 November 1959
58	Sudan	27 January 1961
59	Guinea	19 July 1961
60	Cyprus	2 September 1961
61	Ireland	6 February 1962
62	Algeria	18 January 1963
63	Nigeria	18 January 1963
64	Peru	29 March 1963
65	Mongolia	8 July 1963
66	Bolivia	21 September 1963
67	Paraguay	20 November 1963
68	Cameroon	17 January 1964
69	Ivory Coast	18 June 1964
70	Ecuador	5 February 1965
71	Kenya	14 June 1965
72	Tanzania	14 June 1965
73	Uganda	14 June 1965
74	Libya	28 September 1965
75	Costa Rica	23 August 1966
76	Haiti	29 September 1966
77	Republic of the Congo	22 March 1967
78	El Salvador	14 April 1967
79	Guatemala	18 August 1967
80	Zambia	8 March 1968
81	Senegal	31 January 1969
82	Kuwait	21 February 1969
83	Malta	21 February 1969
84	Saudi Arabia	6 June 1969
85	Cambodia	20 January 1970
86	Liberia	24 March 1970
87	Democratic Republic of the Congo	3 April 1970
88	Central African Republic	22 May 1970
89	Somalia	12 March 1971
90	Trinidad and Tobago	17 December 1971
91	Bangladesh	5 May 1972
92	Germany	7 January 1973
93	Vietnam	25 January 1973
94	Singapore	7 February 1973
95	Oman	1 April 1973
96	North Korea	1 June 1973
97	Malaysia	16 June 1973
98	South Korea	24 August 1973
99	Mauritius	31 October 1973
100	Qatar	1 April 1974
101	Nepal	21 September 1974
102	Bahrain	20 December 1974
103	Laos	1 January 1975
104	United Arab Emirates	21 February 1975
105	Mozambique	18 July 1975
106	Niger	28 November 1975
107	Panama	1 December 1975
108	Nicaragua	22 December 1975
109	Honduras	30 January 1976
110	Angola	18 September 1976
111	Madagascar	1 June 1977
112	Papua New Guinea	31 August 1977
113	Barbados	1 December 1977
114	Fiji	1 December 1977
115	Ghana	1 December 1977
116	Jamaica	1 December 1977
117	Comoros	19 December 1977
118	Yemen	1 April 1978
119	Botswana	1 July 1978
120	Lesotho	1 February 1979
121	Mauritania	1 March 1979
122	São Tomé and Príncipe	1 March 1979
123	Guyana	2 April 1979
124	Guinea-Bissau	1 May 1979
125	Burundi	1 January 1980
126	Burkina Faso	15 February 1980
127	Grenada	1 June 1980
128	Zimbabwe	1 August 1980
129	Rwanda	1 June 1983
130	Cape Verde	22 July 1983
131	Dominican Republic	2 January 1984
132	Maldives	1 October 1984
133	Bhutan	1 May 1986
134	Malawi	1 May 1986
135	Seychelles	1 April 1987
136	Vanuatu	1 April 1987
137	Gabon	1 July 1988
138	Gambia	1 September 1988
139	Brunei	11 November 1988
140	Benin	22 December 1988
141	Namibia	21 March 1990
142	Eswatini	20 September 1990
143	Estonia	29 August 1991
144	Latvia	29 August 1991
145	Lithuania	29 August 1991
146	Slovenia	17 February 1992
147	Croatia	19 February 1992
148	Moldova	21 February 1992
149	Belarus	26 February 1992
150	Tajikistan	26 February 1992
151	Ukraine	26 February 1992
152	Uzbekistan	26 February 1992
153	Kyrgyzstan	23 March 1992
154	Azerbaijan	24 March 1992
155	Armenia	25 March 1992
156	Kazakhstan	13 May 1992
157	Turkmenistan	11 June 1992
158	Liechtenstein	26 June 1992
159	Georgia	8 July 1992
160	Slovakia	1 January 1993
161	Marshall Islands	26 January 1993
162	Eritrea	28 May 1993
163	Tonga	1 December 1993
164	North Macedonia	17 December 1993
165	Bosnia and Herzegovina	29 December 1994
166	Andorra	17 July 1995
167	San Marino	17 July 1995
168	Belize	19 June 1997
169	Solomon Islands	16 July 1999
170	Samoa	11 August 1999
171	Timor-Leste	20 June 2002
172	Suriname	28 June 2005
173	Mali	18 August 2005
174	Bahamas	2 December 2005
175	Montenegro	12 July 2006
176	Djibouti	14 March 2007
177	Chad	21 March 2007
178	Monaco	29 March 2007
179	Saint Vincent and the Grenadines	11 September 2007
180	Equatorial Guinea	30 April 2008
181	Sierra Leone	17 June 2008
182	Antigua and Barbuda	26 September 2008
—	Kosovo	3 February 2009
183	Tuvalu	6 March 2009
184	Nauru	24 March 2009
185	Palau	8 May 2009
186	Dominica	19 August 2009
187	Saint Kitts and Nevis	22 September 2009
188	Saint Lucia	23 September 2009
189	Federated States of Micronesia	4 May 2010
190	Togo	12 May 2010
191	Kiribati	25 March 2011
192	South Sudan	29 June 2012

=== Multilateral ===
Organization	Formal Relations Began	Notes
United Nations	1955	See Permanent Representative of Finland to the United Nations
Nordic Council	1955	Former Prime Minister of Finland Jyrki Katainen in Nordic Council back in 2011: Helsinki Treaty signed in 1962; Ilkka-Christian Björklund Secretary-General of the Nordic Council 1982 – 1987; Gehard af Schultén was Secretary-General of the Nordic Council 1987 – 1989; Jan-Erik Enestam was Secretary-General of the Nordic Council from 1 August 2007 – 2013
OSCE	1973	See Conference on Security and Co-operation in Europe Finland's Minister of Foreign Affairs Olavi J. Mattila, Prime Minister Keijo Liinamaa and President Urho Kekkonen.: Helsinki Accords signed in 1975; Paris Charter signed in 1990
European Union	1995	See 1995 enlargement of the European Union Former prime Minister Sanna Marin and President of the European Commission Ursula von der Leyen meeting in Helsinki 3.2.2022: European Free Trade Association (EFTA), Former member 1986–1994; Council of Europe, member state since 1989; European Economic Area (EEA), Agreement since 1994; Finland joined the European Union as a full member on 1 January 1995; Join of Eurozone in 1999; Schengen Area, since 2001; Nordic Battlegroup / EU Battlegroup, as a full member on 2008
NATO	2023	See Finland–NATO relations The Finnish ambassador hands the NATO membership application to Secretary General Jens Stoltenberg: Partnership for Peace Previous member 1994–2023; Finland joined NATO as a full member on 4 April 2023.

== Africa ==
Country	Formal Relations Began	Notes
Algeria	18 January 1963	Algeria has an embassy in Helsinki.; Finland has an embassy in Algiers.
Angola	18 September 1976	Angola is represented in Finland through its embassy in Stockholm, Sweden.; Finland is represented in Angola through its embassy in Maputo, Mozambique.; Finland also has an honorary consulate in Luanda.
Botswana	1 July 1978	Botswana is represented in Finland through its embassy in Stockholm, Sweden.; Finland is represented in Botswana through its embassy in Pretoria, South Africa.; Finland has an honorary consulate in Gaborone.
Burkina Faso	1 July 1978	Burkina Faso is represented in Finland through its embassy in Copenhagen, Denmark.
Burundi	1 January 1980	Burundi is represented in Finland through its embassy in Oslo, Norway.; Finland is represented in Burundi through its embassy in Dar es Salaam, Tanzania.
Comoros		Comoros is represented in Finland by its embassy in Paris, France.
Djibouti	14 March 2007	Finland is represented in Djibouti through its embassy in Addis Ababa, Ethiopia.; Djibouti is represented in Finland through its embassy in Moscow, Russia.
Egypt	15 February 1947	Finland recognised Egypt on 15 February 1947.; Egypt has an embassy in Helsinki.; Finland has an embassy in Cairo.
Ethiopia	17 July 1959	See Ethiopia–Finland relations Ethiopia is represented in Finland through its embassy in Stockholm, Sweden. Finland has an embassy in Addis Ababa. Ethiopia is one of Finland's long-term development partners and in the water and education sectors. On 29 April 2009, the Ministry of Finance and Economic Development announced that the Finnish government had made a grant of 11.4 million euros to enable the Benishangul-Gumuz Region to upgrade its capacity to plan and manage its rural water supply and sanitation program to achieve universal access for all Ethiopians.
Kenya	14 June 1965	Finland recognised Kenya on 13 December 1963.; Kenya is represented in Finland through its embassy in Stockholm, Sweden.; Finland has an embassy in Nairobi and an honorary consulate in Mombasa.
Morocco	17 July 1959	Finland recognised Morocco's independence on 8 June 1956.; Finland has an embassy in Rabat, an honorary consulate general in Casablanca, and other honorary consulates in Agadir, Kenitra, Marrakesh, Safi, and Tangiers.; Morocco has an embassy in Helsinki.
Mozambique	18 July 1975	Finland recognised Mozambique on 4 July 1975.; Mozambique is represented in Finland through its embassy in Stockholm, Sweden.; Finland has an embassy in Maputo.
Namibia	21 March 1990	See Finland–Namibia relations Finland recognised Namibia on 21 March 1990. Both countries established diplomatic relations on the same day. Namibia is represented in Finland through its embassy in Stockholm, Sweden. Finland has an embassy in Windhoek and an honorary consulate in Walvis Bay.
South Africa	15 May 1949	See Finland – South Africa relations A South African legation was established in 1967 and relations were then upgraded to ambassadorial level in March 1991. Finland has an embassy in Pretoria, a general consulate in Johannesburg, and a consulate in Cape Town. South Africa is accredited to Finland from its embassy in Stockholm, Sweden. During World War II South Africa declared war on Finland. Finland was a strong supporter of the dismantling of Apartheid in South Africa. South African exports to Finland include fresh and dried fruits, wine, pulp, paper, iron, steel, and coal. South Africa imports telecommunication equipment, paper, board products, and machinery from Finland.
Tanzania	14 June 1965	Finland recognised Tanganyika on 9 December 1961.; Tanzania is represented in Finland through its embassy in Stockholm, Sweden.; Finland has an embassy in Dar es Salaam.
Tunisia	17 July 1959	President of Tunisia Habib Bourguiba visiting Valio on his visit in Finland 1963.: Finland recognised Tunisia's independence on 8 June 1956.; Since 1994 Finland has an embassy in Tunis. Previously Finland was represented in Tunisia through its embassies in Algiers, Algeria, and Rome, Italy.; Tunisia has an embassy in Helsinki.
Zambia	8 March 1968	Finland recognised Zambia on 29 October 1964.; Zambia is represented in Finland through its embassy in Stockholm, Sweden.; Finland has an embassy in Lusaka.

== Americas ==
Country	Formal Relations Began	Notes
Antigua and Barbuda	26 September 2008	Finland's embassy in Mexico City, Mexico attends to consular matters relating to Antigua and Barbuda.
Argentina	11 May 1918	See Argentina–Finland relations: Argentina has an embassy in Helsinki.; Finland has an embassy in Buenos Aires and five honorary consulates (in Córdoba, Mendoza, Oberá, Rosario, and Ushuaia).
Bahamas	2 December 2005	Finland's embassy in Ottawa, Ontario, Canada attends to consular matters relating to The Bahamas.; Finland also has an honorary consulate in Nassau.
Barbados	1 December 1977	Barbados is represented in Finland by their embassy in Brussels, Belgium.; Finland has an honorary consulate general in Christ Church.
Belize	19 June 1997	Finland's embassy in Mexico City, Mexico attends to consular matters relating to Belize.; Finland also has an honorary consulate in Belize City.
Bolivia	21 September 1963	Bolivia is accredited to Finland from its embassy in Stockholm, Sweden.; Finland is accredited to Bolivia from its embassy in Lima, Peru.
Brazil	1929	See Brazil–Finland relations President Tarja Halonen together with Luiz Inácio Lula da Silva, the President of Brazil in Helsinki 2007: Brazil has an embassy in Helsinki.; Finland has an embassy in Brasília.
Canada	21 November 1947	See Canada–Finland relations Prime Minister Sanna Marin and Canadian Prime Minister Justin Trudeau: Canada has an embassy in Helsinki.; Finland has an embassy in Ottawa.
Chile	17 June 1919	See Chile–Finland relations Chile recognised Finland's independence on 17 June 1919. Diplomatic relations between them were established in 1931 and have been continuously maintained, despite pressures at times to discontinue them. The two countries maintain resident ambassadors in both capitals.: Chile has an embassy in Helsinki.; Finland has an embassy in Santiago.
Colombia	26 May 1954	Colombia has an embassy in Helsinki.; Finland has an embassy in Bogotá.; The relations between Colombia and Finland are harmonious as both countries share a similar ideology based on democracy, human rights and a lasting peace. It's because of this that Colombia has decided to open an embassy in Helsinki. Colombia also defines Finland as a key player on Colombia's accession into the OECD and the ratification of the Colombia-European Union Trade Agreement.
Costa Rica	23 August 1966	Costa Rica is represent in Finland by their embassy in Oslo, Norway.; Finland's embassy in Mexico City, Mexico attends to consular matters relating to Costa Rica.; Finland also has an honorary consulate general and honorary vice-consulate in San José.
Cuba	23 January 1959	Cuba has an embassy in Helsinki.; Finland's embassy in Mexico City, Mexico attends to consular matters relating to Cuba.; Finland also has an honorary consulate general in Havana.
Dominica	18 August 2009	Finland has an honorary consulate in Roseau.
Dominican Republic	2 January 1984	The Dominican Republic is accredited to Finland from its embassy in Stockholm, Sweden.; Finland has an honorary consulate general in Santo Domingo.
Ecuador	5 February 1965	Ecuador is accredited to Finland from its embassy in Stockholm, Sweden.; Finland's embassy in Lima, Peru attends to consular matters relating to Ecuador.; Finland has an honorary consulate in Guayaquil and Quito.
El Salvador	14 April 1967	El Salvador is accredited to Finland from its embassy in Stockholm, Sweden.; Finland's embassy in Mexico City, Mexico attends to consular matters relating to El Salvador.; Finland has an honorary consulate and an honorary vice-consulate in San Salvador.
Grenada	1 June 1980	Grenada is represented in Finland by their embassy in Stockholm, Sweden.; Finland has an honorary consulate in St. George's.
Guatemala	18 August 1967	Guatemala is accredited to Finland from its embassy in Brussels, Belgium.; Finland has an honorary consulate in Guatemala City.
Guyana	2 April 1979	Both countries established diplomatic relations on 2 April 1979.; Guyana is represented in Finland by their embassy in Brussels, Belgium.; Finland also has an honorary consulate general in Georgetown.
Haiti	29 September 1966	Finland's embassy in Mexico City, Mexico attends to consular matters relating to Haiti.; Finland has an honorary consulate general in Port-au-Prince.
Honduras	30 January 1976	Honduras is represented in Finland by their embassy in Brussels, Belgium.; Finland's embassy in Mexico City, Mexico attends to consular matters relating to Honduras.; Finland has an honorary consulate general in Tegucigalpa and an honorary consulate in San Pedro Sula.
Jamaica	1 December 1977	Jamaica is represented in Finland by their embassy in London, United Kingdom.; Finland has an honorary consulate general in Kingston.
Mexico	2 October 1936	See Finland–Mexico relations President Sauli Niinistö meeting with President Enrique Peña Nieto in 2015 Mexico recognized the independence of Finland in July 1920.: Finland has an embassy in Mexico City.; Mexico has an embassy in Helsinki.
Nicaragua	22 December 1975	See Finland–Nicaragua relations: Finland is accredited to Nicaragua from its embassy in Mexico City, Mexico.; Nicaragua has an honorary consulate in Helsinki.
Panama	1 December 1975	Panama is accredited to Finland from its embassy in Stockholm, Sweden.; Finland's embassy in Bogota, Colombia attends to consular matters relating to Panama.; Finland has an honorary consulate general in Panama City.
Paraguay	20 November 1963	Paraguay is accredited to Finland from its embassy in Stockholm, Sweden.; Finland's embassy in Buenos Aires, Argentina attends to consular matters relating to Paraguay.; Finland has an honorary consulate in Asunción.
Peru	29 March 1963	Minister of Foreign Affairs Erkki Tuomioja with Embajador Fernando Rojas in 2014: Peru has an embassy in Helsinki.; Finland has an embassy in Lima.
Saint Kitts and Nevis	22 September 2009	Finland has an honorary consulate in Basseterre.
Saint Lucia	22 September 2009	Finland has an honorary consulate in Castries.
Saint Vincent and the Grenadines	30 January 1976	Finland is represented in Saint Vincent and the Grenadines through a roving ambassador.; Finland has an honorary consulate in Kingstown.; Saint Vincent and the Grenadines is represented in Finland through its embassy in London.
Suriname	28 June 2005	Finland's embassy in Brasília, Brazil attends to consular matters relating to Suriname.; Finland has an honorary consulate in Paramaribo.
Trinidad and Tobago	17 December 1971	Trinidad and Tobago is accredited to Finland from its embassy in London, United Kingdom.; Finland has an honorary consulate general in Barataria.
United States	30 May 1919	See Finland–United States relations President Ronald Reagan meeting with President Mauno Koivisto in 1988 President Donald Trump with President Sauli Niinistö of Finland at the Mäntyniemi Residence, July 16, 2018 5-25-1988 President Reagan meeting with President Mauno Henrik Koivisto during a trip to Finland at the Helsinki airport in Vantaa Relations between the United States and Finland are warm. Some 200,000 US citizens visit Finland annually, and about 3,000 US citizens are resident there. The US has an educational exchange program in Finland that is comparatively large for a Western European country of Finland's size. It is financed in part from a trust fund established in 1976 from Finland's final repayment of a US loan made in the aftermath of World War I. Finland is bordered on the east by Russia and, as one of the former Soviet Union's neighbours, has been of particular interest and importance to the US both during the Cold War and in its aftermath. Before the Soviet Union dissolved in 1991, longstanding US policy was to support Finnish neutrality and to maintain and reinforce Finland's historic, cultural, and economic ties with the West. The US has welcomed Finland's increased participation since 1991 in Western economic and political structures. Economic and trade relations between Finland and the United States are active and were bolstered by the F-18 purchase. US-Finland trade totals almost $5 billion annually. The US receives about 7% of Finland's exports – mainly wood pulp and paper, ships, machinery, electronics and instruments and refined petroleum products – and provides about 7% of its imports – principally computers, semiconductors, aircraft, and machinery.: Finland has an embassy in Washington, D.C., and consulates-general in Los Angeles and New York City.; United States has an embassy in Helsinki.
Uruguay	21 March 1935	See Finland–Uruguay relations: Finland's embassy in Buenos Aires, Argentina accredited to Uruguay and maintains an honorary consulate in Montevideo.; Uruguay has an embassy in Helsinki.
Venezuela	31 March 1954	Finland is accredited to Venezuela from its embassy in Bogotá, Colombia.; Venezuela is accredited to Finland from its embassy in Oslo, Norway.

== Asia ==
Country	Formal Relations Began	Notes
Afghanistan	11 May 1956	Afghanistan recognised the independence of Finland on 17 July 1928.; Afghanistan is accredited to Finland through its embassy in Oslo, Norway.; Finland opened a liaison office in Kabul in 2002. It converted into an embassy on 1 January 2006.
Armenia	25 March 1992	See Armenia–Finland relations: Finland recognised Armenia on 30 December 1991.; Armenia is represented in Finland by a non-resident ambassador (based in Yerevan at the Ministry of Foreign Affairs).; Finland is represented in Armenia by a non-resident ambassador (based in Helsinki at the Ministry of Foreign Affairs) and an honorary consulate in Yerevan.; Both countries are full members of the Council of Europe.
Azerbaijan	24 March 1992	See Azerbaijan–Finland relations Alexander Stubb with Ilham Aliyev in 2024: Finland recognised Azerbaijan on 24 March 1992.; Azerbaijan is represented in Finland through its embassy in Stockholm (Sweden) and an honorary consulate in Helsinki.; Finland is represented in Azerbaijan by a non-resident ambassador (based in Helsinki at the Ministry of Foreign Affairs) and an honorary consulate in Baku.; Both countries are full members of the Council of Europe.
Cambodia	20 January 1970	Prime Minister Sanna Marin and Prime Minister Hun Sen: Finland recognized Cambodia on 19 December 1969. Diplomatic relations established on 20 January 1970, re-established 9 August 1976.; Cambodia is represented in Finland through its embassy in London, England; Finland is represented in Cambodia through its embassy in Bangkok, Thailand
China	28 October 1950	See China–Finland relations The two international trade organisations are the Finland-China Trade Association and the China Council for Promotion of International Trade (CCPIT). One of the fastest growing areas of trade between the two countries is in environmental protection. and information technology. Nokia is the largest Finnish investor in China.: China has an embassy in Helsinki.; Finland has an embassy in Beijing and consulates-general in Hong Kong and Shanghai.
Georgia	8 July 1992	See Finland–Georgia relations President Sauli Niinistö with President of Georgia Salome Zourabichvili in 2019: Finland recognised Georgia on 27 March 1992.; Finland is represented in Georgia by a non-resident ambassador (based in Helsinki at the Ministry of Foreign Affairs) and an honorary consulate in Tbilisi.; Georgia is represented in Finland through its embassy in Stockholm (Sweden) and an honorary consulate in Helsinki.; Both countries are full members of the Council of Europe.; Finland is an EU member and Georgia is an candidate.; On 22 April 2009, the Georgian Foreign Minister visited Finland.
India	10 September 1949	See Finland–India relations The Prime Minister, Dr. Manmohan Singh and the Prime Minister Matti Vanhanen in Helsinki on 2006.: Finland has an embassy in New Delhi and three honorary consulates in Kolkata, Chennai, and Mumbai.; India has an embassy in Helsinki.
Indonesia	6 September 1954	See Finland–Indonesia relations: Finland recognised the independence of Indonesia on 10 February 1950.; Finland has an embassy in Jakarta and honorary consulates in Denpasar and Medan.; Indonesia has an embassy in Helsinki.
Iran		See Finland–Iran relations Mohammad Reza Pahlavi and the Farah Pahlavi visit to Espoo, Finland. To their right, the Finnish president Urho Kekkonen in 1970 Photograph of the Shah and the Shahbanu during their visit to Tapiola residencial area in Espoo, Finland. To their right, the Finnish president Urho Kekkonen.: Finland has an embassy in Tehran.; Iran has an embassy in Helsinki.
Iraq	15 May 1959	Finland recognised Iraq on 15 May 1959.; Finland has an embassy in Baghdad.; Iraq has an embassy in Helsinki.
Israel	14 November 1950	See Finland–Israel relations: Finland recognised Israel on 18 March 1949.; Finland has an embassy in Tel Aviv.; Israel has an embassy in Helsinki.; Both countries are full members of the Union for the Mediterranean.; Along with the rest of the European Union, Finland has not recognized the State of Palestine.; See also History of the Jews in Finland
Japan	6 September 1919	See Finland–Japan relations Sauli Niinistö and Shinzo Abe: Japan recognised Finland on 23 May 1919.; Finland has an embassy in Tokyo and honorary consulate general in Osaka and other honorary consulates in Kitakyushu, Nagano, Nagoya, and Sapporo.; Japan has an embassy in Helsinki.
Kazakhstan	13 May 1992	See Finland–Kazakhstan relations: Finland recognized Kazakhstan upon its independence from the Soviet Union.; Finland has an embassy in Astana.; Kazakhstan has an embassy in Helsinki.
Kyrgyzstan	23 March 1992	Finland recognized Kazakhstan upon its independence from the Soviet Union.
Malaysia	17 November 1972	See Finland–Malaysia relations: Finland has an embassy in Kuala Lumpur.; Malaysia has an embassy in Helsinki.
Nepal	30 August 1955	Finland recognised Nepal on 14 December 1955.; Finland has an embassy in Kathmandu.; Nepal is represented in Finland through its embassy in Copenhagen, Denmark.
North Korea	1 June 1973	See Finland–North Korea relations: Finland recognized the People's Democratic Republic of Korea on 13 April 1973.; Finland condemns North Korean nuclear tests and fully agrees with EU foreign policy statements on this matter.; International trade has been irregular and sporadic, and it is controlled by UN and EU sanctions.; Finland has contributed to humanitarian assistance to North Korea through the Red Cross and the World Food Programme.; Neither Finland nor North Korea currently have resident ambassadors. North Korea is represented by the North Korean embassy in Stockholm, Sweden. Finland is represented by the Finnish embassy in Seoul, South Korea.
Northern Cyprus		Northern Cyprus has a Representative Office in Helsinki.
Pakistan	12 January 1951	See Finland–Pakistan relations: Finland is accredited to Pakistan from its Ministry of Foreign Affairs based in Helsinki.; Pakistan is accredited to Finland from its embassy in Stockholm, Sweden.
Philippines	14 July 1995	Finland has an embassy in Manila.; Philippines is accredited to Finland from its embassy in Stockholm, Sweden.
Saudi Arabia	23 September 1969	Finland has an embassy in Riyadh and an honorary consulate general in Jeddah.; Saudi Arabia has an embassy in Helsinki.
South Korea	24 August 1973	The establishment of diplomatic relations between the Republic of Finland and the South Korea began on 1973-08-24.; Finland recognised South Korea on 13 April 1973.; Finland has an embassy in Seoul.; South Korea has an embassy in Helsinki.
Syria	22 May 1953	Finland had an embassy in Damascus and two honorary consulates general in Aleppo and Latakia.; Syria is represented in Finland through its embassy in Stockholm, Sweden.
Thailand	21 June 1954	Thailand, previously known as Siam, recognised Finland's independence on 9 October 1919.; Siam was the second non-European state after the United States and the first Asian state to recognise Finland's independence.; Finland has an embassy in Bangkok, its honorary consulate general in Phuket and its honorary consulate in Chiang Mai.; Thailand has an embassy in Helsinki.
Turkey	20 May 1920	See Finland–Turkey relations: Turkey recognised the independence of Finland on 21 February 1918.; Finland has an embassy in Ankara and an honorary consulate general in Istanbul and other honorary consulates in Adana, Alanya, Antalya, Belek, Bodrum, İzmir and Kayseri.; Turkey has an embassy in Helsinki.; Both countries are full members of the Council of Europe and of NATO.; Finland is an EU member and Turkey is an EU candidate. Finland supports Turkey's accession negotiations to the EU, although negotiations have now been suspended.; Turkey did not fully support the accession of Finland to NATO until March 2023, whereupon it was accepted.; See also Turks in Finland
United Arab Emirates	21 February 1975	See Finland–United Arab Emirates relations: Finland recognised United Arab Emirates on 21 February 1975.; Finland has an embassy in Abu Dhabi.; United Arab Emirates has an embassy in Helsinki.
Vietnam	5 January 1973	See Finland–Vietnam relations: Finland recognised Vietnam on 28 December 1972.; Finland has an embassy in Hanoi and an honorary consulate in Ho Chi Minh City.; Vietnam has an embassy in Helsinki.

== Europe ==
Country	Formal Relations Began	Notes
Albania	8 June 1956	Finnish Prime Minister Sanna Marin and Albanian Prime Minister Edi Rama See Albania–Finland relations: Albania is accredited to Finland from its embassy in Stockholm, Sweden.; Finland is accredited to Albania from its embassy in Athens, Greece.; Albania is an EU candidate and Finland is a member.; Both countries are full members of NATO and the Council of Europe.
Austria	29 March 1949	See Austria–Finland relations Finnish Prime Minister Sanna Marin and President of Austria Alexander Van der Bellen in 2023: Austria has an embassy in Helsinki.; Finland has an embassy in Vienna.; Both countries are full members of the European Union and the Council of Europe.
Belarus	26 February 1992	Finnish Prime Minister Sanna Marin and Sviatlana Tsikhanouskaya in 2021: Finland recognised the independence of Belarus on 30 December 1991.; Finland is represented in Belarus through its embassy in Vilnius, Lithuania, which also operates a liaison office in Minsk.; Belarus opened an embassy in Helsinki on 5 December 2011.
Belgium	9 July 1919	Belgium has an embassy in Helsinki.; Finland has an embassy in Brussels.; Both countries are full members of the European Union, NATO and the Council of Europe.
Bulgaria	5 August 1918	See Bulgaria–Finland relations Finnish Prime Minister Petteri Orpo and Mariya Gabriel in 2023: In 1963, the diplomatic representations of the two countries were upgraded to the level of embassy.; Bulgaria has an embassy in Helsinki and an honorary consulate in Kemi.; Finland has an embassy in Sofia and an honorary consulate in Varna.; Both countries are full members of the European Union and NATO.
Croatia	19 February 1992	See Croatia–Finland relations Prime Minister Sanna Marin and Croatian Prime Minister Andrej Plenković: Croatia has an embassy in Helsinki.; Finland has an embassy in Zagreb.; Both countries are full members of the European Union, NATO and the Council of Europe.
Cyprus	2 September 1961	See Cyprus–Finland relations: Finland recognised Cyprus on 16 August 1960.; Cyprus has an embassy in Helsinki and an honorary consulate in Vantaa.; Finland has an embassy in Nicosia.; Both countries are full members of the European Union and the Council of Europe.
Czech Republic	1 January 1993	Prime Minister Sanna Marin and Prime Minister of Czech Republic Petr Fiala in 2022: Czech Republic has an embassy in Helsinki.; Finland has an embassy in Prague.; Both countries are full members of the European Union, NATO and the Council of Europe.
Denmark	18 February 1918	See Denmark–Finland relations: Denmark has an embassy in Helsinki.; Finland has an embassy in Copenhagen.; Denmark officially recognized Finland's independence in 1918.; Both countries are full members of the Nordic Council and the Nordic Passport Union, with no border controls or limitations on travel and residence. On cases concerning an individual, authorities must arrange translations between Finnish and Danish, if necessary.; Both countries are members of the European Union, NATO, the Council of Europe and the Council of the Baltic Sea States.; Both countries are full members of Joint Expeditionary Force (JEF).; Denmark and Finland share a long history, where Danish Vikings settled in Finland and made crusades. Both countries were also part of the Kalmar Union. Denmark was the first country along with Sweden to recognize Finland's Independence. There are 3,000 Finns living in Denmark, and 1,235 Danes living in Finland. During Winter War, over 1,000 Danish volunteers came to help Finland. During the Winter War and the Continuation War, Denmark took 4,200 Finnish war children. Exports to Denmark value at 1.380 billion euros, and imports from Denmark value at 1.453 billion, making Denmark Finland's 10th largest import-trading partner. The Nordic Culture Fund and the Finnish-Danish Cultural Fund support projects of artists in both countries. Many tourists from Finland visit Denmark, 206,000 in 2017, and vice versa: 113,000 Danish tourists visited Finland in 2017. In 1918 Mannerheim visited Copenhagen, asking if Prince Aage would have wanted to become the King of Finland.
Estonia	29 August 1991	See Estonia–Finland relations Prime Minister Sanna Marin and Prime Minister of Estonia Kaja Kallas in 2022 Finland's main language, Finnish, is related to Estonian, and there is and has been a certain feeling of kinship. 76% of Finns have visited Estonia and in 2004, 1.8 million Finns reported visiting Estonia. Finnish and Swedish investors are the largest foreign investors in Estonia. Finland and Estonia are members of the European Union and the Schengen agreement, freeing international travel and trade between the countries. Finland's government recognised Estonia's independence in 1920. In response to the Soviet invasion, diplomatic missions were de facto removed. However, with the restoration of Estonian independence, this "temporary obstruction" was resolved. Both countries restored diplomatic relations on 29 August 1991.: Estonia has an embassy in Helsinki and five honorary consulates in Oulu, Turku, Raseborg, Tampere and Kotka.; Finland has an embassy in Tallinn and an honorary consulate in Tartu.; Finland contributed and continues to contribute military aid to Estonia, e.g., training of officers, provision of equipment.: Both countries are full members of the European Union, NATO and the Council of Europe.; Both countries are full members of Joint Expeditionary Force (JEF).
France	24 January 1918	See Finland–France relations President of Finland Alexander Stubb with President of France Emmanuel Macron in Paris 2026: France was one of the first countries which recognised Finland's independence on 4 January 1918.; Finland has an embassy in Paris and 18 honorary consulates (in Ajaccio, Bordeaux, Brest, Caen, Cherbourg, Dijon, Lille, Lyons, Marseille, Monaco, Nancy, Nice, Reims, Rouen, Sète, Strasbourg, Toulouse and Papeete in Tahiti).; France has an embassy in Helsinki and its honorary consulates in Hämeenlinna, Joensuu, Jyväskylä, Kuopio, Oulu, Pori, Rovaniemi, Tampere and Turku.; There are an estimated 6,000 Finns living in France.; Both countries are full members of the European Union and NATO.
Germany	4 January 1918	See Finland–Germany relations C.G.E. Mannerheim, Adolf Hitler and Risto Ryti in June 4th 1942 during Hitler's visit in Finland Prime Minister Sanna Marin and Chancellor Olaf Scholz: Germany recognised Finland's independence on 4 January 1918.; Germany gave direct military support to Finnish independence by training Finnish Jägers and successfully intervened in Finnish Civil War in favor of the nationalist Whites.; During World War II, the secret protocol in Molotov–Ribbentrop pact enabled Winter War (1939–40), a Soviet attack on Finland. Finland and Nazi Germany were "co-belligerents" against Soviet Union during Continuation War (1941–44), but a separate peace with Soviet Union led to the Finnish-German Lapland War (1944–45).; The Federal Republic of Germany and the German Democratic Republic (West and East Germany) were both recognised on 7 January 1972, by Finland.; Diplomatic relations between Finland and West Germany were established on 7 January 1973.; Finland has an embassy in Berlin, and consulate general in Hamburg, two honorary consulates general in Düsseldorf and Munich and other honorary consulates in Bremen, Dresden, Frankfurt am Main, Hanover, Kiel, Lübeck, Rostock, Stuttgart, and Wilhelmshaven.; Germany has an embassy in Helsinki.; Both countries are full members of the European Union, NATO and the Council of Europe.
Greece	5 January 1918	See Finland–Greece relations Prime Minister Sanna Marin with Prime Minister of Greece Kyriakos Mitsotakis in 2022: Greece recognised Finland's independence on 5 January 1918.; Finland has an embassy in Athens.; Greece has an embassy in Helsinki.; Both countries are full members of the European Union, NATO and the Council of Europe.
Hungary	20 May 1947	See Finland–Hungary relations: Hungary recognised Finland on 23 August 1920. Finland recognised Hungary on 10 September 1920.; Finland broke off diplomatic relations on 20 September 1944.; Diplomatic relations were re-established on 20 May 1947.; Both national languages, Finnish and Hungarian, are Uralic languages, which has led to cultural exchange albeit at a much smaller scale compared to the third major Uralic-speaking country, Estonia.; Finland has an embassy in Budapest and an honorary consulate in Pécs.; Hungary has an embassy in Helsinki and four honorary consulates (in Turku, Mariehamn, Tampere and Joensuu).; Both countries are full members of the European Union, NATO and the Council of Europe.
Iceland	15 August 1947	See Finland–Iceland relations Sanna Marin met the Prime Minister of Iceland Katrín Jakobsdóttir in Kesäranta on 2022: Finland has an embassy in Reykjavík.; Iceland has an embassy in Helsinki.; Both countries are full members of the Nordic Council and the Nordic Passport Union, with no border controls or limitations on travel and residence. On cases concerning an individual, authorities must arrange translations between Finnish and Icelandic, if necessary.; Both countries are full members of NATO and Joint Expeditionary Force (JEF).
Ireland	2 November 1961	Prime Minister Sanna Marin with Taoiseach, Prime Minister of Ireland Micheál Martin in 2022: Finland has an embassy in Dublin and three honorary consulates (in Cork, Dublin and Limerick).; Ireland has an embassy in Helsinki.; Both countries are full members of Council of Europe and of the European Union.
Italy	6 September 1919	See Finland–Italy relations Finnish President Sauli Niinistö with Italian President Sergio Mattarella: Italy recognised Finland's independence on 27 June 1919.; Finland has an embassy in Rome and two honorary consulate generals in Milan and Venice and other honorary consulates in Genoa, Bari, Cagliari, Catania, Florence, Livorno, Messina, Naples, Palermo, Rimini, Trieste and Turin.; Italy has an embassy in Helsinki and its honorary consulates in Hanko, Jyväskylä, Kotka, Kuopio, Oulu, Pori, Rovaniemi, Tampere, Turku and Vaasa.; Both countries are full members of the European Union and NATO.
Kosovo	3 February 2009	Main article: Finland–Kosovo relations Finland recognised Kosovo 7 March 2008. Finland maintains an embassy in Pristina.
Latvia	24 September 1919	See Finland–Latvia relations Prime Minister Sanna Marin met Latvia's Prime Minister Krišjānis Kariņš 12 February 2020: Finland recognised Latvia's independence de facto on 24 September 1919, and de jure on 21 January 1921.; Finland has an embassy in Riga.; Latvia has an embassy in Helsinki and four honorary consulates (in Åland, Satakunta, Kymenlaakso and Oulu).; Both countries are full members of the Council of the Baltic Sea States, the European Union, NATO and Joint Expeditionary Force (JEF).
Lithuania	4 November 1919	See Finland–Lithuania relations Lithuanian President Gitanas Nausėda met with Finnish Prime Minister Petteri Orpo in Helsinki, 2 September 2025: Finland recognised Lithuania's independence de facto on 14 November 1919, and de jure on 14 October 1921.; Finland recognised Lithuania's independence on 28 August 1991, and the two countries started diplomatic relations the very same day. Finland is a key partner and neighbour to Lithuania, with the countries pursuing active cooperation in the fields of economy, energy, regional, information security, to name a few. Currently, there are 11 bilateral agreements regulating the relationship between Lithuania and Finland different fields.; Finland has an embassy in Vilnius and an honorary consulate in Klaipėda.; Lithuania has an embassy in Helsinki.; Both countries are full members of the Council of the Baltic Sea States, the European Union, NATO, Joint Expeditionary Force (JEF).
Luxembourg	25 October 1921	Sanna Marin and Prime Minister of Luxembourg Xavier Bettel in 2022: Luxembourg recognised Finland's independence on 25 October 1921.; Finland has an embassy in Luxembourg City.; Luxembourg is accredited to Finland through its embassy in Copenhagen.; Both countries are full members of the European Union and NATO.
Malta	21 February 1969	Finland is represented in Malta through its embassy in Rome, Italy, and an honorary consulate in Valletta.; Malta is represented in Finland by a non-resident ambassador (based in Valletta at the Ministry of Foreign Affairs) and an honorary consulate in Helsinki.; Both countries are full members of the European Union.
Montenegro	12 July 2006	Sanna Marin met the Prime Minister of Montenegro Dritan Abazović, on 2022: Finland recognised Montenegro 29 June 2006.; Finland is an EU member and Montenegro is an candidate.; Both countries are full members of NATO.
Netherlands	18 August 1918	See Finland–Netherlands relations President of Finland Kekkonen with the Queen Juliana and Prince Bernhard of Lippe-Biesterfeld on their way to Palace, October 24, 1972 Prime Minister Orpo and Prime Minister of Netherlands Rutte in 2024: The Netherlands recognised Finland's independence on 28 January 1918.; Finland has an embassy in The Hague and honorary consulate general in Amsterdam and other honorary consulates in Rotterdam and Terneuzen.; The Netherlands has an embassy in Helsinki and consulates (in Kuopio, Mariehamn, Oulu, Rovaniemi, Tampere, Turku and Vaasa).; Both countries are full members of the European Union, NATO and Joint Expeditionary Force (JEF).
North Macedonia		Finnish Prime Minister Sanna Marin with North Makedonian President Stevo Pendarovski in 2022: Finland is an EU member and North Macedonia is an candidate.; Both countries are full members of NATO.
Norway	6 April 1918	See Finland–Norway relations Olav V, King of Norway, and President of Finland Urho Kekkonen in 1961: Norway recognised Finland's independence on 10 January 1918.; Finland has an embassy in Oslo and other honorary consulates in Bergen, Bodø, Drammen, Farsund, Grimstad, Halden, Hamar, Hammerfest, Haugesund, Horten, Kirkenes, Kristiansand, Kristiansund, Larvik, Moss, Narvik, Sarpsborg, Stavanger, Tromsø, Trondheim, Vadsø, and Ålesund.; Norway has an embassy in Helsinki.; Both countries are full members of the Nordic Council and the Nordic Passport Union, with no border controls or limitations on travel and residence. On cases concerning an individual, authorities must arrange translations between Finnish and Norwegian, if necessary.; Both countries are full members of the Council of the Baltic Sea States, Council of Europe, NATO and Joint Expeditionary Force (JEF).
Poland	8 March 1919	See Finland–Poland relations Prime Minister Sanna Marin and Prime Minister of Poland Mateusz Morawiecki in 2022: Finland has an embassy in Warsaw and an honorary consulate in Gdynia.; Poland has an embassy in Helsinki.; Both countries are full members of the Council of the Baltic Sea States, the European Union, and NATO.
Portugal	10 January 1920	See Finland–Portugal relations: Portugal recognised Finland's independence on 19 December 1919.; Finland has an embassy in Lisbon and honorary consulates in Faro, Lisbon, Porto, Vila Real de Santo António, Ponta Delgada in the Azores and Funchal in Madeira.; Portugal has an embassy in Helsinki.; Both countries are full members of the European Union and NATO.
Romania	14 October 1949	Romania recognised Finland on 8 April 1920.; Finland has an embassy in Bucharest and two honorary consulates (in Bucharest and Constanţa).; Romania has an embassy in Helsinki.; Both countries are full members of the European Union, NATO, and the Organization for Security and Co-operation in Europe.
Russia	30 December 1991	Main article: Finland–Russia relations Nikita Khrushchev speaking, Urho Kekkonen, Leonid Brezhnev, Nikolai Podgorny, Jorma Vanamo and Kustaa Loikkanen in 1963 Vladimir Putin and Sauli Niinistö in 2017 Finland was a part of the Russian Empire for 108 years, after being annexed from the Swedish empire. Discontent with Russian rule, Finnish national identity, and World War I eventually caused Finland to break away from Russia, taking advantage of the fact that Russia was withdrawing from World War I and a revolution was starting in earnest. Following the Finnish Civil War and October Revolution, Russians were virtually equated with Communists and due to official hostility to Communism, Finno-Soviet relations in the period between the world wars remained tense. Voluntary activists arranged expeditions to Karelia (heimosodat), which ended when Finland and the Soviet Union signed the Treaty of Tartu in 1920. However, the Soviet Union did not abide by the treaty when they blockaded Finnish naval ships. Finland was attacked by the Soviet Union in 1939. Finland fought the Winter War and the Continuation War against the Soviets in World War II. During the wars, the Finns suffered 90,000 casualties and inflicted severe casualties on the Russians (120,000 dead in the Winter War and 200,000 in the Continuation War). Contemporary issues include problems with border controls causing persistent truck queues at the border, airspace violations, pollution of the Baltic Sea, and Russian duties on exported wood to Finland's pulp and paper industry. Russia also considered large swathes of land near the Finnish border as special security area where foreign land ownership is forbidden. A similarly extensive restriction does not apply to Russian citizens. The Finnish Defence Forces and Finnish Security Intelligence Service have suspected that Russians have made targeted land purchases near military and other sensitive installations for intelligence or special operations purposes. Right-wing commentators accuse the government of continuing the policy of Finlandisation. Recently, Finland-Russia relations have been under pressure with annexation of Crimea by the Russian Federation, which Finland considers illegal. Together with the rest of the European Union, Finland enforces sanctions against Russia that followed. Still, economic relations have not entirely deteriorated: 11.2% of imports to Finland are from Russia, and 5.7% of exports from Finland are to Russia, and cooperation between Finnish and Russian authorities continues.: Finland has an embassy in Moscow and a consulate-general in Saint Petersburg.; Russia has an embassy in Helsinki, a consulate-general in Turku and consulates in Lappeenranta and Mariehamn.
Serbia	1929	See Finland–Serbia relations: Finland has an embassy in Belgrade.; Serbia has an embassy in Helsinki.; Finland is an EU member and Serbia is an candidate.
Slovakia	1 January 1993	Prime Minister Sanna Marin and Prime Minister of Slovakia Eduard Heger in 2022: Finland recognised the independence of Slovakia on 1 January 1993.; Finland has an embassy and an honorary consulate in Bratislava.; Slovakia has an embassy in Helsinki.; Both countries are full members of the European Union and NATO.
Slovenia	17 February 1992	President Sauli Niinistö and Prime Minister of Slovenia Robert Golob meet up in 2023 Vilnius summit: Finland recognised Slovenia on 17 January 1992.; Finland has an embassy in Ljubljana.; Slovenia has an embassy in Helsinki.; Both countries are full members of the European Union and NATO.; Tensions between the countries rose in late 2008 when a news program on Finland's national broadcasting company station YLE accused Finnish weapons manufacturer Patria of bribing Slovenian officials to secure an arms deal. Slovenian Prime Minister Janez Janša formally complained to the Finnish ambassador in Ljubljana. This controversy became known as the Patria case.
Spain	16 August 1918	See Finland–Spain relations Prime Minister Sanna Marin and Spanish Prime Minister Pedro Sánchez in Stockholm on 2 February 2023: Spain recognised Finland's independence on 21 February 1918.; Finland has an embassy in Madrid and two honorary consulates general in Barcelona and Sevilla and other honorary consulates in A Coruña, Benidorm, Bilbao, Gijón, Málaga, Palma de Mallorca, Pilar de la Horadada, Santa Cruz de Tenerife, Santander, Valencia and Vigo.; Spain has an embassy in Helsinki.; Both countries are full members of the European Union and NATO.
Sweden	10 January 1918	Main article: Finland–Sweden relations President Urho Kekkonen, Swedish Queen Silvia, director Åke Wolfram of Wärtsilä, and king Carl XVI Gustaf in Turku on 28 April 1981 Prime Minister Sanna Marin and Swedish Prime Minister Ulf Kristersson in Stockholm on 2 February 2023 Finland and Sweden have always had very close relations, resulting from shared history, numerous commonalities in society and politics, and close trade relations. A newly appointed Foreign Minister makes his or her first state visit to Sweden. Finnish politicians often consider Sweden's reaction to international affairs first as a base for further actions, and thus finally both countries often agree on such issues. If there has ever been any dissonance between the two countries those were the Åland question in the early 1920s and the Swedish declaration of non-belligerent status during the Winter War. Finland and Sweden are members of the European Union and the Schengen agreement, freeing international travel and trade between the countries. Furthermore, both participate in the Nordic Council, which grants Swedish nationals slightly more extensive rights than the EU/Schengen treaties alone.: Finland has an embassy in Stockholm.; Sweden has an embassy in Helsinki.; Both countries became members of the European Union on 1 January 1995.; Both countries applied for NATO membership on 18 May 2022. Finland became a member on 4 April 2023, while Sweden became a member on 7 March 2024.; Both countries are full members of the European Union, NATO and of the Council of Europe.
Switzerland	29 January 1926	Finland recognised Switzerland on 29 January 1926.; Finland has an embassy in Bern.; Switzerland has an embassy in Helsinki.
Turkey	20 May 1920	See Turkey in Asia Above: See Finland–Turkey relations
Ukraine	26 February 1992	See Finland–Ukraine relations Finnish Prime Minister Sanna Marin meets with Ukrainian President Volodymyr Zelenskyy, Kyiv, Ukraine, 26 May 2022: In 1918, Finland was one of the first countries which recognised Ukraine in 1918 and opened its diplomatic mission in Kyiv.; Finland recognised Ukraine on 30 December 1991.; Finland has an embassy in Kyiv.; Ukraine has an embassy in Helsinki.; Both countries are full members of the Council of Europe.; Finland is an EU member and Ukraine is an candidate.
United Kingdom	6 May 1919	See Finland–United Kingdom relations Prime Minister Keir Starmer with President of Finland Alexander Stubb: Finland has an embassy in London and honorary consulates in Aberdeen, Belfast, Birmingham, Bristol, Cardiff, Dover, Dundee, Edinburgh, Gibraltar, Glasgow, Hamilton, Harwich, Hull, Immingham, Leeds, Lerwick, Liverpool, Manchester, Middlesbrough, Newcastle upon Tyne, Nottingham, Plymouth, Rochester, Sheffield, Southampton and St Helier.; The United Kingdom has an embassy in Helsinki and honorary consulates in Jyväskylä, Kotka, Kuopio, Oulu, Rovaniemi, Turku, Tampere, Vaasa and Åland.; Both countries are full members of NATO and the Council of Europe.; Both countries are full members of Joint Expeditionary Force (JEF).

== Oceania ==
Country	Formal Relations Began	Notes
Australia	31 May 1949	Main article: Australia–Finland relations Australian Prime Minister Anthony Albanese and President of Finland Sauli Niinistö in 2022 Diplomatic relations were established on 31 May 1949.: Australia is accredited to Finland from its embassy in Stockholm, Sweden.; Finland has an embassy in Canberra and a consulate in Sydney.
New Zealand	22 July 1950	Main article: Finland–New Zealand relations Prime Minister Sanna Marin and New Zealand Prime Minister Jacinda Ardern: Finland is accredited to New Zealand from its embassy in Canberra, Australia.; New Zealand is accredited to Finland from its embassy in The Hague, Netherlands.

== International organization participation ==
- AfDB
- AsDB
- Australia Group
- BIS
- CBSS
- CCC
- CE
- CERN
- EAPC
- EBRD
- ECE
- EIB
- ESA
- EU
- FAO
- G-9
- IADB
- IAEA
- IBRD
- ICAO
- ICC
- ICC
- ICRM
- IDA
- IEA
- IFAD
- IFC
- IFRCS
- IHO
- ILO
- IMF
- IMO
- ITUC
- Interpol
- IOC
- IOM
- ISO
- ITU
- MINURSO
- NATO
- NC
- NEA
- NIB
- NSG
- OAS (observer)
- OECD
- OPCW
- OSCE
- PCA
- PFP
- UN
- UNCTAD
- UNESCO
- UNHCR
- UNIDO
- UNIKOM
- UNITAR
- UNMEE
- UNMIBH
- UNMIK
- UNMOGIP
- UNMOP
- UNOMIG
- UNTAET
- UNTSO
- UPU
- WEU (observer)
- WFTU
- WHO
- WIPO
- WMO
- WTrO
- Zangger Committee

=== Sub-national government participation ===
Åland Islands

- Unrepresented United Nations

== See also ==
- Finland under Swedish rule
- Grand Duchy of Finland
- Finland–NATO relations
- Politics of Finland
- Arctic policy of Finland
- Ministry for Foreign Affairs (Finland)
- List of diplomatic missions in Finland
- Visa requirements for Finnish citizens
- Pulp mill conflict between Argentina and Uruguay (for the conflict over the installation of a pulp mill by the Finnish company Botnia in Uruguay, across the Uruguay River)

== Sources ==
- Volanen, Risto (2017). Suomen synty (in Finnish). Helsingissä: Kustannusosakeyhtiö Otava. ISBN 978-951-1-31053-2.
