= Finland–Pakistan relations =

- Finland: Pakistan

Finland–Pakistan relations refer to the bilateral relations between Finland and Pakistan. The first Ambassador of Finland to Pakistan was nominated on 12 January 1951, and for many years they were mostly focused on trade and economic co-operation.

== Diplomatic missions ==
There is no embassy of Pakistan in Finland, but Finnish residents may receive consular services from the Embassy of Pakistan in Stockholm. Since 1951, Pakistan has been represented in Finland by Honorary Consulate, currently led by Mr. Wille Eerola, Hon. Consul General

The Finnish Embassy in Islamabad, Pakistan closed in August 2012 due to budget cuts by the government but reopened officially on 1 September 2022. Current Ambassador, H.E. Hannu Ripatti had his credential ceremony with the President of Pakistan, Dr. Arif Alvi on October 3, 2022, in Islamabad, Pakistan, continuing to run the Embassy of Finland in Pakistan after a ten years break. On 28 November 2025, the Foreign Ministry of Finland announced the closing of several embassies in 2026; among these, the embassy of Finland in Islamabad closed on 16 June 2026 and was relocated to Qatar.

For 2012–2022, Finland had a Roving Ambassador to South Asia who was also in charge of the Pakistan relations, with an emphasis on developing economic co-operation, with an office in Helsinki at the Ministry for Foreign Affairs of Finland.

== Business cooperation ==
The Finland Pakistan Business Council is an organisation established in 1985, registered in both Finland and Pakistan with the purpose of enhancing trade and business relationships between the two countries. Although historically bilateral trade has been rather moderate, more and more Finnish businesses are interested in the Pakistani market. A number of notable Finnish companies are present there.

Finland Pakistan Business Summit is a set of B2B events held in Pakistan and Finland since 2014. The latest events took place in Islamabad, Lahore and Karachi in May 2025. and next one is held in October 2026.

== Resident diplomatic missions ==
- Finland is accredited to Pakistan from its embassy in Doha, Qatar.
- Pakistan is accredited to Finland from its embassy in Stockholm, Sweden.

== See also ==
- Foreign relations of Finland
- Foreign relations of Pakistan
- Pakistanis in Finland
