= Finland–France relations =

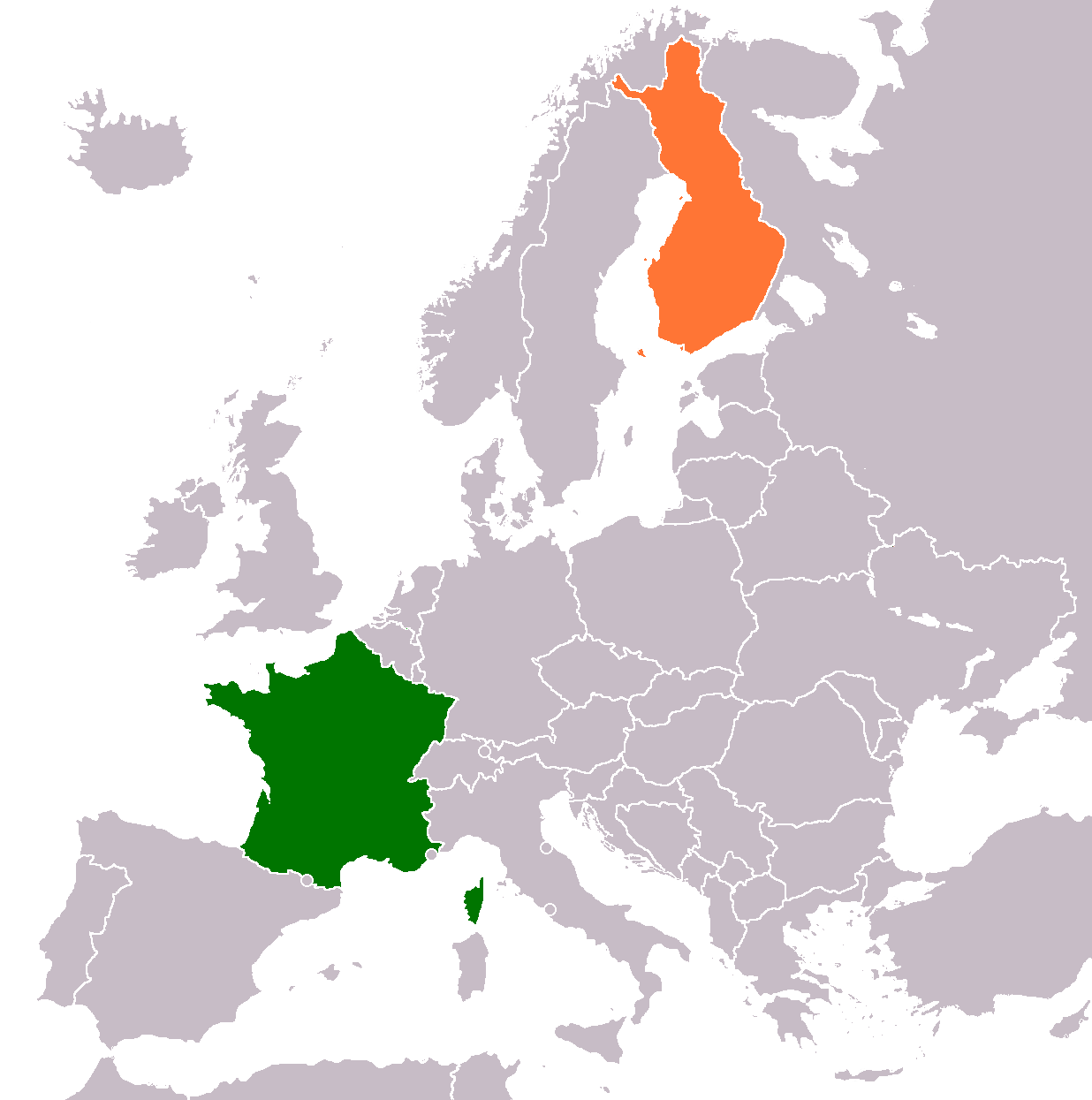
- France: Finland

Finland–France relations are foreign relations between Finland and France. France was one of the first countries which recognised Finland's independence on 4 January 1918. Diplomatic relations between them were established on 24 January 1918. According to a 2005 BBC World Service Poll, 48% of Finns view French influence positively, with 26% expressing a negative view. There are an estimated 7,000 Finns living in France. Both countries are members of the COE, EU, NATO, and Eurozone. France strongly supported Finland's NATO membership during the latter's accession process. Also France is Observer bureau of the BEAC, CBSS and AC.

== History ==
Finnish army captain Aarne Juutilainen served in the French Foreign Legion in Morocco between 1930 and 1935 (French conquest of Morocco).

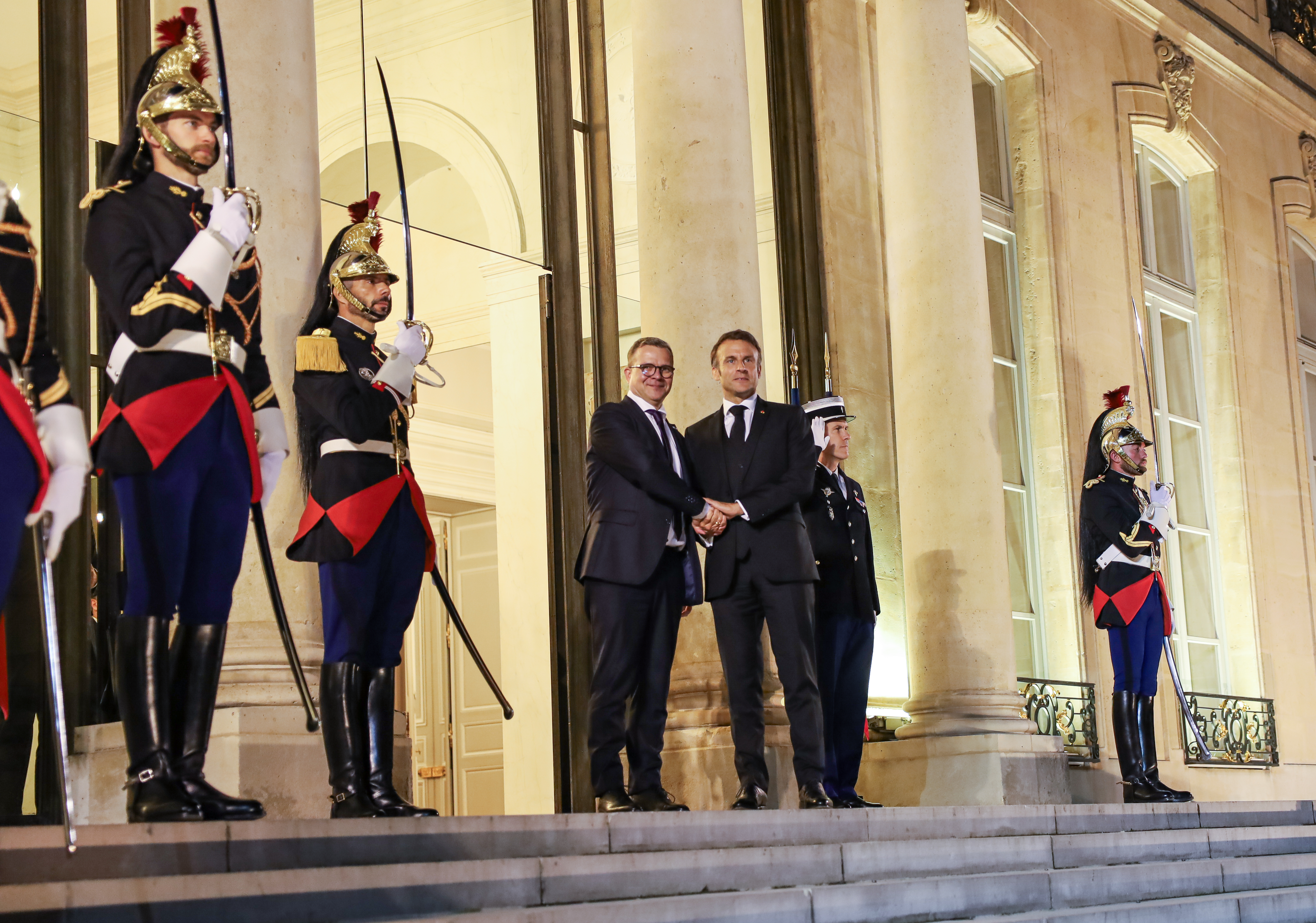
Finnish Prime Minister Petteri Orpo meets with French President Emmanuel Macron in Paris, 4 October 2023

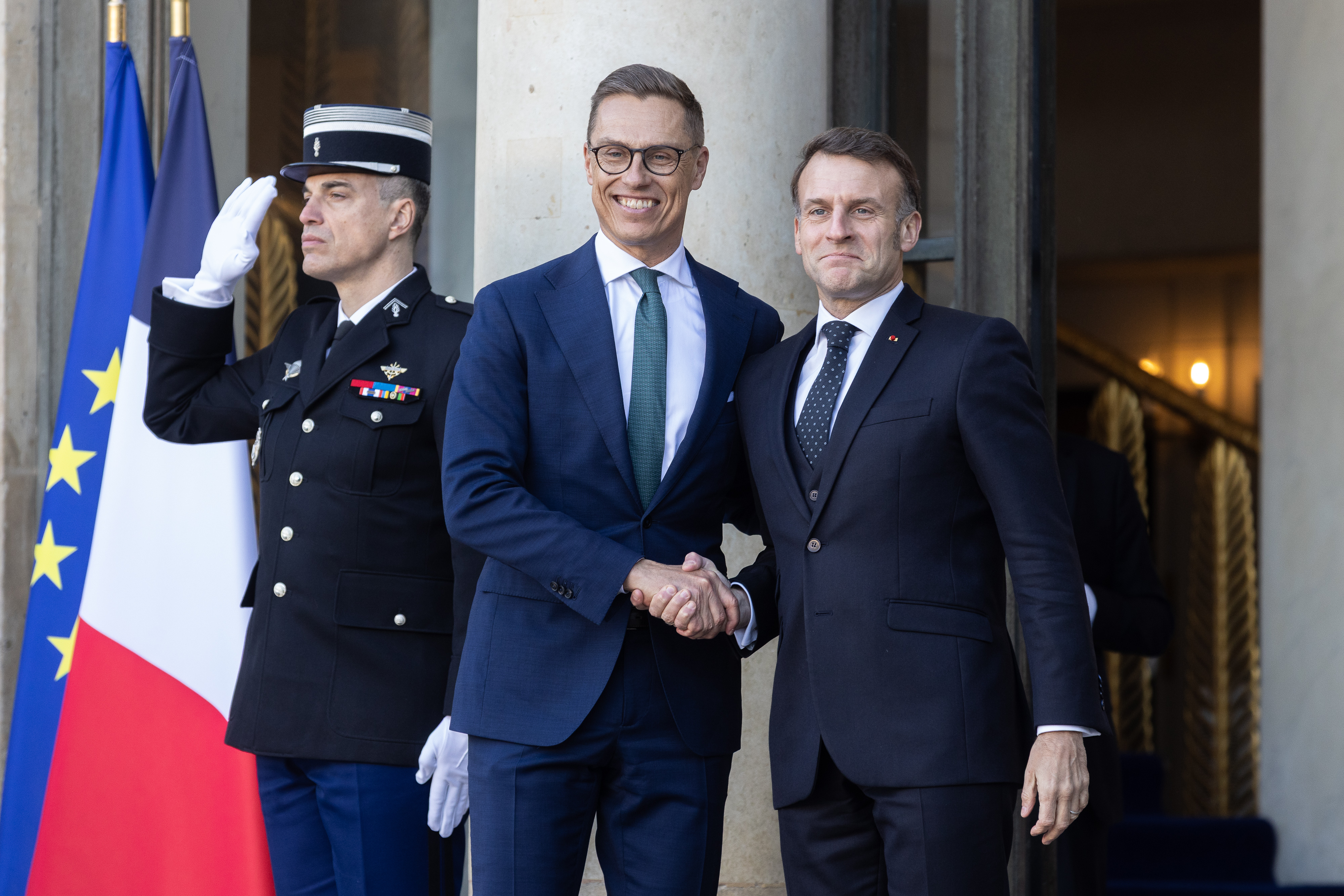
Finnish President Alexander Stubb meets with French President Emmanuel Macron in Paris, 6 January 2026

In August 2022, France fully ratified Finland's NATO membership application.

== Resident diplomatic missions ==
- France has an embassy in Helsinki.
- Finland has an embassy in Paris.

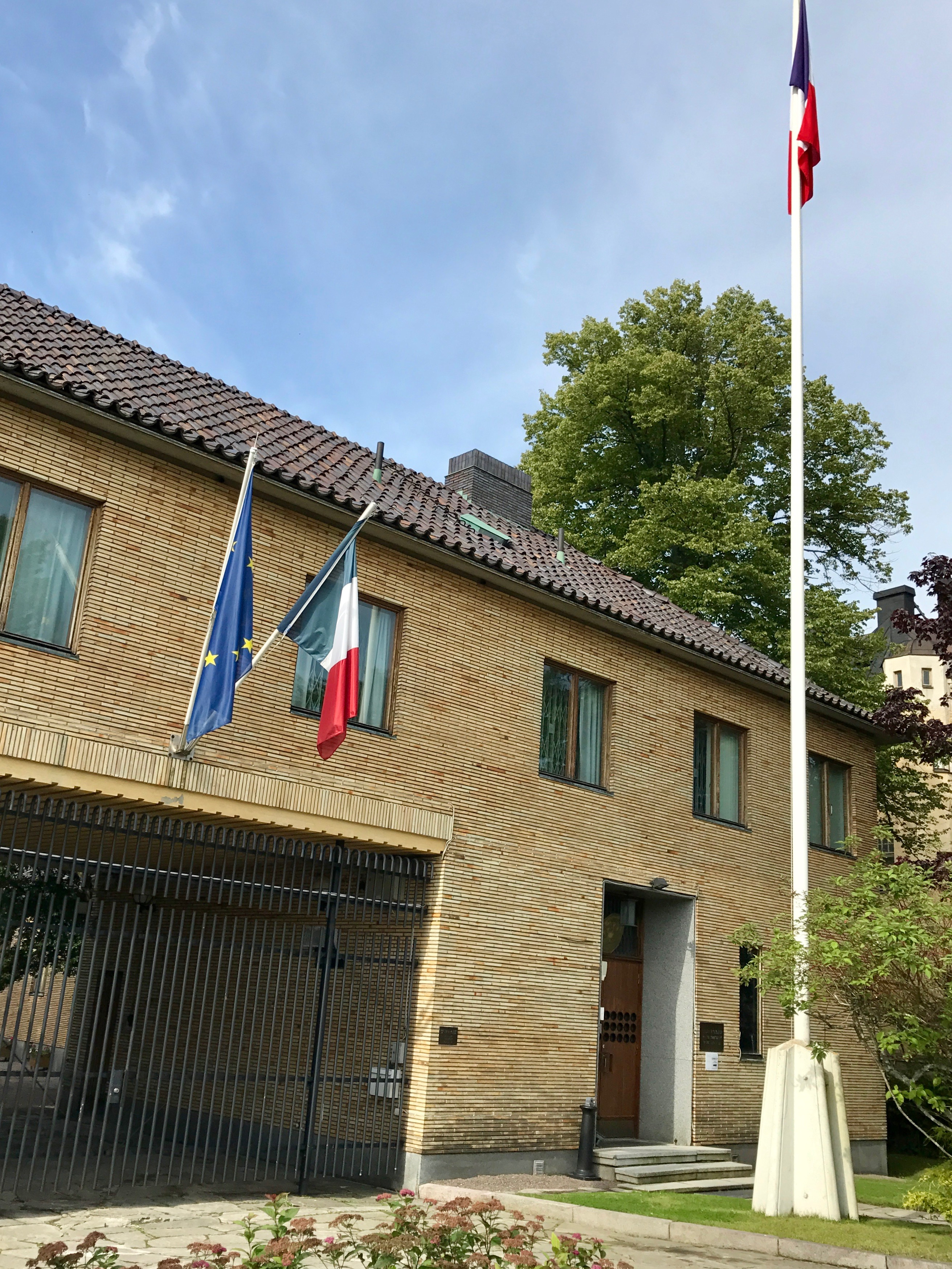
Embassy of France in Helsinki

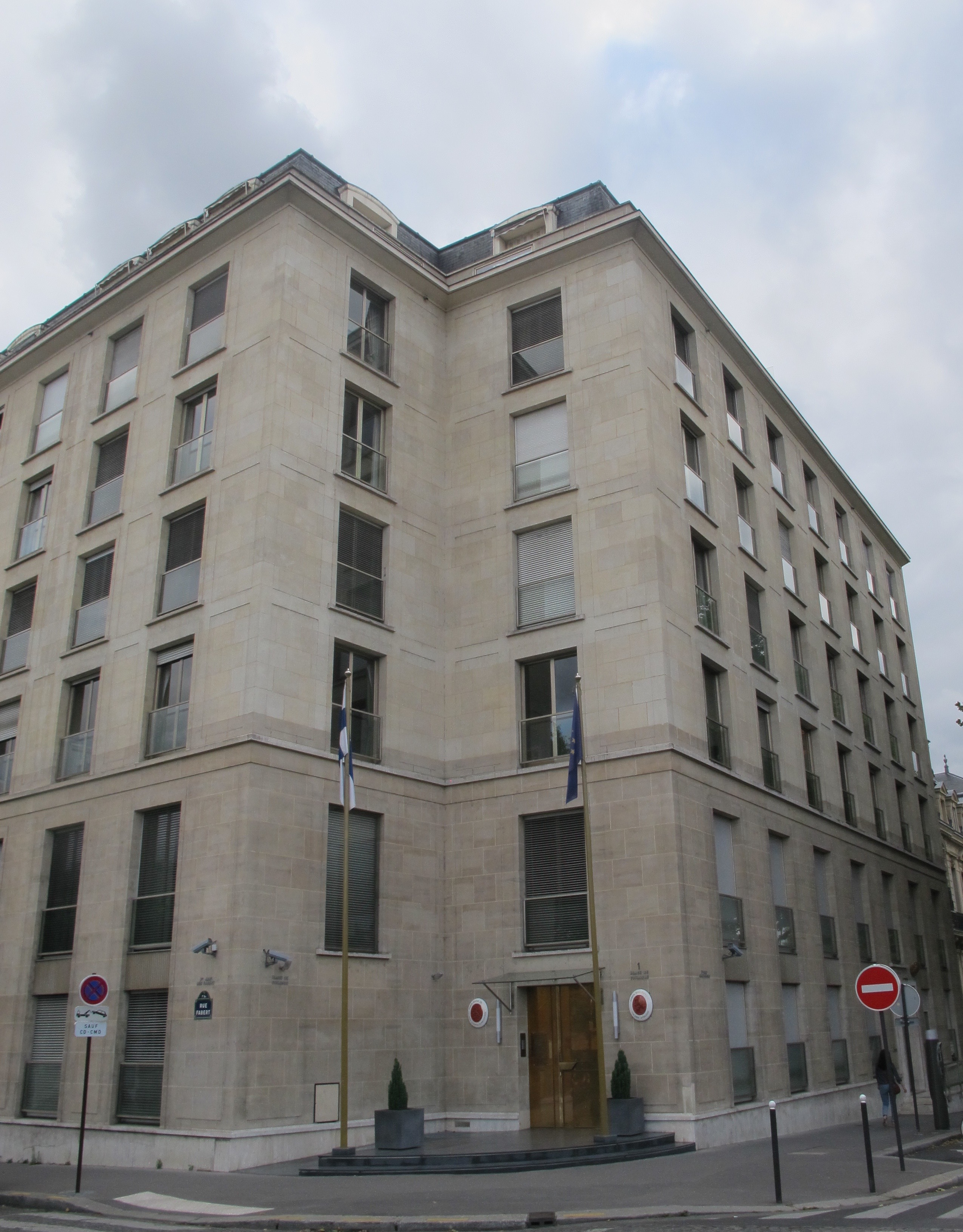
Embassy of Finland in Paris

== See also ==
- Foreign relations of Finland
- Foreign relations of France
- Finland–NATO relations
