= Drazin =

Drazin may refer to:

== People ==
- Michael P. Drazin (1929–2026), an American mathematician
  - Drazin inverse, mathematical theory by Michael P. Drazin
- Philip Drazin (1934–2002), a British mathematician

== Places ==
- Dražin Do, a village in Bosnia and Herzegovina
- Drazin, Iran, a village in Kerman Province, Iran

== See also ==
- Draza (disambiguation)
- Dražan (disambiguation)
- Dražen (disambiguation)
- Dražen (given name)
