= Dražen =

- Pronunciation: Serbo-Croatian: [ˈdrǎ.ʒen]
- Gender: Male
- Language: Serbo-Croatian

Origin
- Origin: South Slavic

Other names
- Alternative spelling: Serbian Cyrillic: Дражен
- Derived: drag (precious)
- Related names: Drago, Dragan, Dragomir, Dragoljub, Dragoslav, Dragutin

Dražen (Cyrillic: Дражен) is a Croatian and Serbian masculine given name. It is derived from the common Slavic element drag (meaning "dear, beloved"), and was originally a diminutive of names beginning with Drag-.

== Notable people with the name ==
- Dražen Anzulović (born 1967), Croatian basketball player and coach
- Dražen Bagarić (born 1992), Croatian footballer
- Dražen Besek (born 1963), Croatian football player and manager
- Dražen Biškup (born 1965), Croatian football player and manager
- Dražen Bogopenec (fl. 1306–1307), Croatian nobleman
- Dražen Bolić (born 1971), Serbian football player
- Dražen Bošnjak, Bosnian-American composer and sound designer
- Dražen Bošnjaković (born 1961), Croatian politician
- Dražen Brnčić (born 1971), Croatian football player and manager
- Dražen Bubnić (born 1986), Croatian-Slovenian basketball player
- Dražen Budiša (born 1948), Croatian politician
- Dražen Dalipagić (1951–2025), Serbian basketball player and manager of Bosnian-Herzegovinian origin
- Dražen Erdemović (born 1971), Bosnian soldier and war criminal of Serb and Croat descent
- Dražen Funtak (born 1975), Croatian sprint canoer
- Dražen Gović (1981–2022), Croatian football player
- Mirko Dražen Grmek (1924–2000), Croatian and French historian of medicine
- Dražen Janković (1965–2018), Serbian musician and actor
- Dražen Katunarić (born 1954), Croatian poet and novelist
- Dražen Kekez (born 1995), Croatian footballer
- Dražen Kovačević (born 1974), Serbian comic book author
- Dražen Kühn (born 1965), Croatian actor
- Dražen Kutleša (born 1968), Croatian Catholic prelate
- Dražen Ladić (born 1963), Croatian football player and manager
- Dražen Lalić (born 1960), Croatian sociologist
- Dražen Luburić (born 1993), Serbian volleyball player
- Dražen Madunović (born 1971), Croatian footballer
- Dražen Marović (born 1938), Croatian chess player
- Dražen Međedović (born 1982), Montenegrin footballer
- Dražen Mužinić (born 1953), Croatian football player
- Dražen Okuka (born 1986), Serbian footballer
- Dražen Perković (born 1963), Croatian taekwondo practitioner
- Dražen Pernar (born 1971), Croatian footballer
- Dražen Petrović (1964–1993), Yugoslav and Croatian basketball player
- Dražen Pilčić (born 1989), Croatian footballer
- Dražen Podunavac (born 1969), Serbian footballer
- Dražen Prćić (born 1967), Serbian Croat novelist
- Drazen Prelec (born 1955), Croatian-American economist and university professor
- Dražen Ričl (1962–1986), Bosnian rock musician and comedian of Czech and Bosniak descent
- Dražen Šćuri (born 1962), Croatian military commander
- Dražen Sermek (born 1969), Croatian chess player
- Dražen Silić (born 1985), Croatian bobsledder
- Dražen Vuković (born 1981), Croatian footballer
- Dražen Zečić (born 1967), Croatian singer-songwriter
- Dražen Žerić (born 1964), Bosnian singer of Bosniak descent
- Dražen Žeželj (born 1976), Slovenian footballer
- Dražen Zlovarić (born 1989), Serbian basketball player and coach

== See also ==
- Dražeň, village in the Czech Republic
- Dražan, name
