= Finland–Kosovo relations =

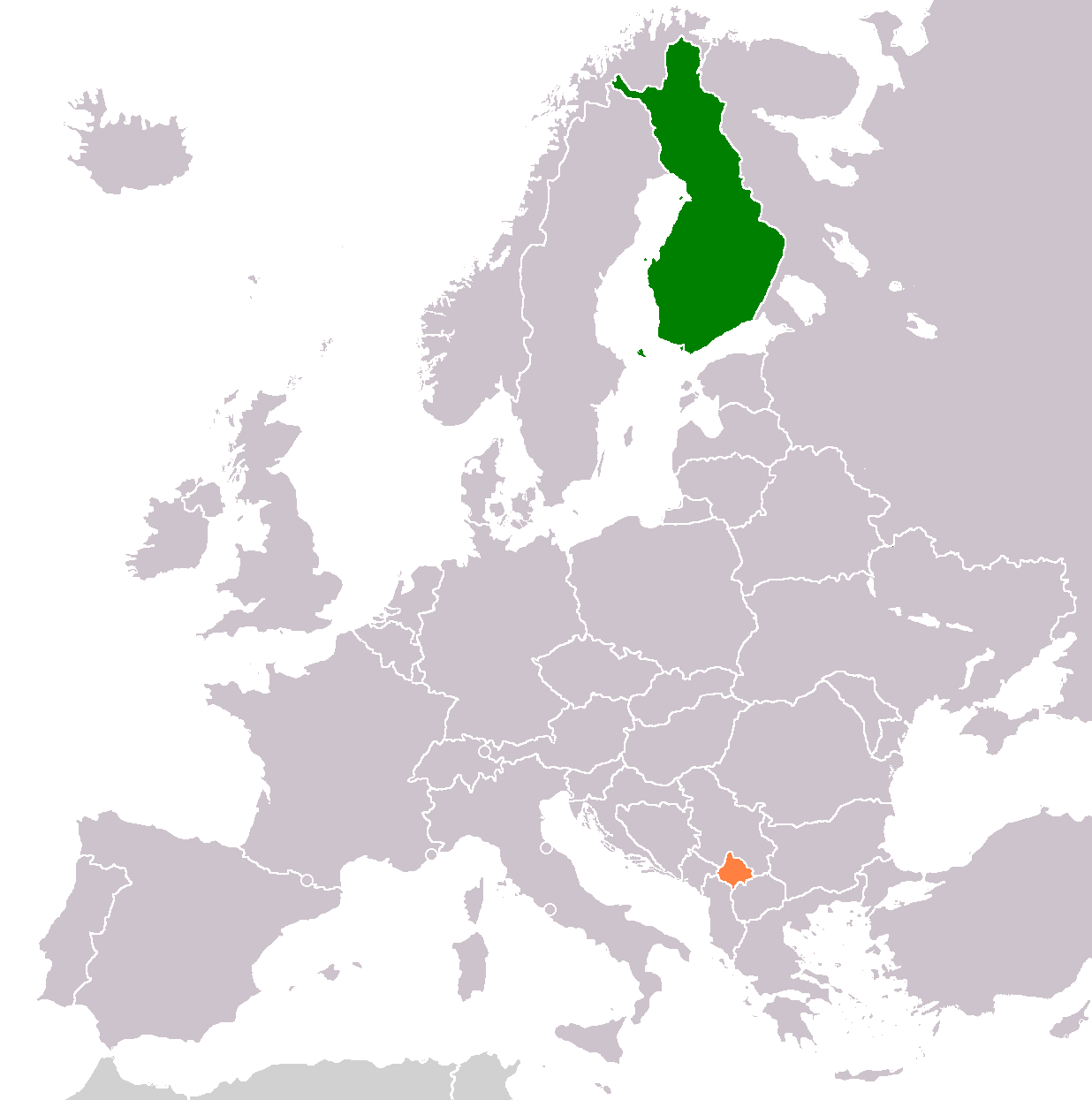
- Finland: Kosovo

Finland–Kosovo relations are foreign relations between Finland and Kosovo. Kosovo declared its independence from Serbia on 17 February 2008 and Finland recognised it on 7 March 2008. Finland maintains an embassy in Pristina. Kosovo and Finland share a diplomatic relationship that has evolved significantly since Kosovo's declaration of independence in 2008. Finland, one of the first non-NATO countries to contribute to the Kosovo Force (KFOR) mission, has played a vital role in ensuring peace and stability in Kosovo. In addition to military and peacekeeping contributions, Finland has supported Kosovo through various development initiatives and diplomatic recognition.

== History ==
Finland engaged in Kosovo following the 1999 war, providing humanitarian aid to Albania and Macedonia during the refugee crisis.

=== Ahtisaari’s Role in Kosovo Peace Talks and Challenges in Reconciliation ===
Martti Ahtisaari at an airport on his way way to Russia to negotiate Kosovo's peace in May 1999.

In 1999, the President of Finland, Martti Ahtisaari, was reported as wanting to step up attempts to secure a peace agreement for Kosovo in his new role as a leading negotiator for the European Union. It was also reported that "Correspondents say that despite Mr Ahtisaari's support for air strikes, his position as president of a non-NATO country could make him palatable to Belgrade [Serbian Government]." In 2007, United Nations envoy for Kosovo says independence was the "only viable option" for the territory of Kosovo.

However, Ahtisaari's plan for peace failed and he was unable to reconcile Serbs and Albanians in Kosovo and that "Serbians see him as a leading player in the break-up of their country."

=== Finland's Early Initiatives in Kosovo Post-1999 War ===
In 1999, Finland undertook minor initiatives, including funding the International Criminal Tribunal for the former Yugoslavia to investigate war crimes and allocating a budget for small civil-military cooperation (CIMIC) projects through the Finnish KFOR Forces. Additionally, the Liaison Office in Pristina began operations in late August to coordinate EU assistance during Finland's EU Presidency. The decision to maintain the office's operations beyond the Presidency was made only at the end of the year.

=== Support for Kosovo’s Disabled Community ===
Another element of Finland's Kosovo program stands out due to an anecdote shared by all Finnish interviewees during this evaluation. During a Finnish TV news report on Kosovo refugee camps in Macedonia, a disabled individual in a wheelchair made a heartfelt plea to his Finnish friend, a well-known advocate for disabled people in Finland: “Kalle, help us, the disabled are suffering in Kosovo!” This personal appeal led to a support project for HandiKOS, Kosovo's association for disabled people, in the latter half of 1999. Initially implemented through Oxfam due to the lack of banking operations in Kosovo, the project was later managed by FIDIDA and the Finnish Association of the Deaf under a consultancy contract.

=== Finland’s Major and Minor Projects in Kosovo by the End of 2000 ===
By the end of 2000, Finland had three major projects in Kosovo, implemented or tendered by Finnish companies, focused on special education, water management, and primary health services, along with five smaller projects: the second phase of the FAO agricultural support project (March 2000 – October 2001), a human rights education project (local NGO), the FCA reconstruction project, support to HandiKOS (now managed by FIDIDA), and a women's empowerment project (Mitrovica Women's Centre, led by the Finnish Refugee Council). Finnish KFOR forces also conducted CIMIC projects funded through Finnish ODA.

Additionally, Finland funded a mine-clearing project in 2000 (running until August 2001) implemented by ACT (Action Churches Together, Norwegian People's Aid, and UNOPS). Kosovo also participated in two regional initiatives starting in 2000: the ERNO project for Balkans TV news material exchange and an interethnic youth football project.

=== Regional Initiatives and Short-Term projects Funded by Finland (2001–2007) ===
Between 2001 and 2007, Finland funded only a few short-term initiatives, including translators for the Kosovo Ombudsperson’s Office, UN-Habitat projects on environmental hotspots and land registers, UNDP grants for women's safety, and three regional projects, reflecting the stability of its approach.

Most projects’ initial phases ended by 2002–2003, with more ambitious objectives in their second phases (2003–2007). The human rights education project illustrates this shift. During its first phase (1999–2001), it successfully raised awareness, established a Human Rights Centre at the University of Pristina, and became a key player in human rights despite flexible management practices. However, in the second phase (2003–2007), efforts to mainstream human rights education into all university teaching were slow, as noted in a 2004 mid-term review, though the project remained respected and experienced in Kosovo.

=== Kosovo Independence and Finland’s Support ===
Following Kosovo's declaration of independence from Serbia in 2008, Kosovo Albanians living in Finland celebrated and expressed their gratitude to the Finnish Government and President Ahtisaari.

== Military ==
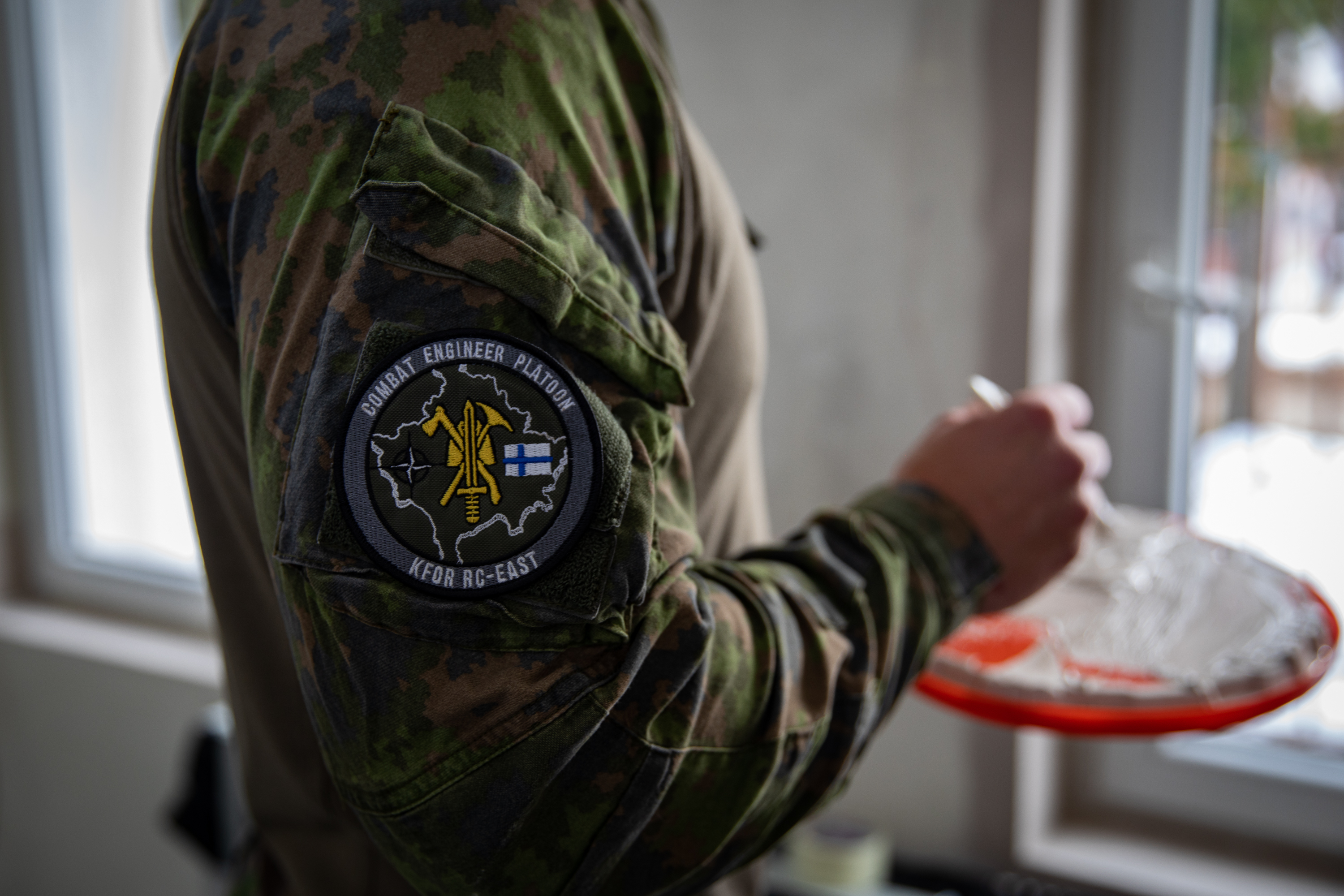
Finnish soldiers assigned to Regional Command-East of the NATO-led Kosovo Force mission, also known as KFOR, renovate a room in a police station.

=== Finland's Early Contribution to KFOR Mission in Kosovo (1999) ===
The Finnish were one of the first non-NATO countries to contribute to maintaining a safe and secure environment in Kosovo, joining the KFOR mission in August 1999.

Their Area of responsibility (AOR) was in MNB Centre around Lipjan and Shtime. They operated nine camps and eight permanent Observation Points (OPs) and Checkpoints (CPs). "Camp Ville," located in Lipjan, served as their main camp, with around 350 soldiers under the command of Lt. Col. Jorma Ala-Sankila.

At its peak, the Finnish battalion (FINBAT) included 820 soldiers, organized into five subunits: A-, B-, C-, HQ-, and LOG-Company. These companies conducted patrols, Mobile Check Points (MCPs), and staffed various OPs and CPs using Armored Personnel Carriers (APCs) known as "PASI," manufactured by the Finnish company SISU. The APCs were equipped with NSV anti-aircraft machine guns, and the soldiers carried standard-issue SAKO Model 95 assault rifles.

=== Finnish Forces' Equipment and Operations in Kosovo ===
The battalion also included an Explosive Ordnance Disposal (EOD) team with a specialized mine-clearing vehicle called "RAISU," which significantly contributed to clearing mines in Kosovo.

Composed mainly of reservists, FINBAT was created specifically for the KFOR mission. Of the 6,000 applicants, only 820 were selected, making it a highly motivated and skilled force. Finland, with a long tradition of peacekeeping since 1956, had previously served in Suez, Sinai, Lebanon, Cyprus, Bosnia, FYROM, Namibia, and Afghanistan.

"The Finnish battalion upheld a high standard in executing daily peacekeeping tasks and promoting a safe and secure environment in Kosovo as part of KFOR," said Finnish Major Asko Tanhuanpaa.

=== Continued Finnish Peacekeeping Commitment in Kosovo (2024) ===
In 2009, Finland had 411 troops serving in Kosovo as peacekeepers in the NATO led Kosovo Force.

As of 2024, Finland maintains approximately 70 troops in Kosovo as part of the NATO-led Kosovo Force (KFOR) mission. These personnel are involved in various roles, including staff officers, liaison officers, and engineers, contributing to peacekeeping efforts and supporting regional stability.

== Economic relations ==
=== Finland's Role in Kosovo's Economic Development through the DEED Project ===
Finland has significantly contributed to Kosovo's economic development, particularly by supporting the Kosovar diaspora. A key initiative is the Diaspora Engagement for Economic Development (DEED) project, funded by Finland and implemented by UNDP and IOM. This project channels remittances, which make up 10% of Kosovo's GDP, into poverty reduction and entrepreneurship.

=== Establishment of Entrepreneur Networks and Bilateral Trade Opportunities ===
The DEED project has established Kosovar entrepreneur networks in 16 countries, including Finland, Germany, Switzerland, and the US In August, the Finnish network launched, fostering business connections and bilateral trade. During a visit to Finland, Minister of Diaspora Ibrahim Makolli highlighted the dual benefits of financial investments and new working cultures brought by migrants.

Kosovar businesses abroad, like restaurants and family enterprises, are actively collaborating. In Germany, for instance, a Kosovar entrepreneur network co-invested in a fruit and vegetable collection center in Western Kosovo, partially funded by Kosovo's Ministry of Agriculture.

=== Investment Promotion and Risk Mitigation in Kosovo's Entrepreneurial Landscape ===
Additionally, the DEED project promotes investment through free trade zones and a diaspora investment fund, pooling resources to reduce risks. It also facilitates access to lower-interest loans via international banks, enabling Kosovar entrepreneurs to grow their ventures while maintaining ties to Kosovo.

Kosovo sees further collaboration opportunities with Finland in medicine, education, and institutional strengthening. Minister Makolli underscored that Finland's support is helping Kosovo build a self-sufficient and sustainable future.

== Diplomatic ties ==
=== Finland's Recognition of Kosovo's Independence ===
On March 7, 2008, Finland formally recognized Kosovo as an independent and sovereign state following a decision by the President Tarja Halonen, based on the Government's recommendation. The decision included Finland's willingness to establish diplomatic relations with Kosovo, which was communicated in writing by Foreign Minister Ilkka Kanerva to Kosovo's President Fatmir Sejdiu and Prime Minister Hashim Thaçi.

Kosovo declared independence on February 17, 2008, and soon requested Finland's recognition. Finland's decision followed the EU foreign ministers’ joint statement on February 18, 2008, which outlined a framework for EU member states to develop relations with Kosovo in line with national procedures and international law.

In his communication, Foreign Minister Kanerva highlighted Kosovo's commitment to implementing the Ahtisaari Plan, a proposal by UN Special Envoy Martti Ahtisaari, and stressed Finland's support for Kosovo's dedication to democracy, the rule of law, human rights, and protecting the rights of all communities. He also underscored the importance of fostering good relations with neighboring countries.

=== Finland's Contributions to Kosovo's Development and Stability ===
Finland expressed strong support for the international community's continued presence in Kosovo to ensure stability. The EU had already committed to launching its largest civilian crisis management mission, EULEX, which was set to begin on June 15, 2008, with around 2,000 international experts.

Finland planned to make significant contributions to Kosovo's development and stability. This included sending over 80 experts to the EULEX mission, assuming command of a KFOR battlegroup in its area of responsibility, and increasing Finland's KFOR peacekeeping presence to 450 troops by summer 2008. Furthermore, Finland pledged 15 million euros to support Kosovo's development over the following years.

== See also ==
- Foreign relations of Finland
- Foreign relations of Kosovo
- Kosovo-NATO relations
- Accession of Kosovo to the EU
- Finland–Serbia relations
- Finland–Yugoslavia relations
