= Drazen (disambiguation) =

Dražen is a Serbo-Croatian masculine given name.

Drazen may also refer to:

- Dražeň, a municipality and village in the Czech Republic
- Drążeń, a village in Poland
- Jeffrey M. Drazen, American physician

== See also ==
- Drazan
