= Scuri =

Scuri is an Italian surname. Notable people with this surname include:

- Angelo Scuri (born 1959), Italian fencer
- Daniel Scuri (born 1962), Argentinian rower
- Decio Scuri (1905–1980), Italian basketball coach and administrator
- Dražen Šćuri (born 1962), Croatian air force commander
- Enrico Scuri (1805–1884), Italian painter
