= Croatia–France relations =

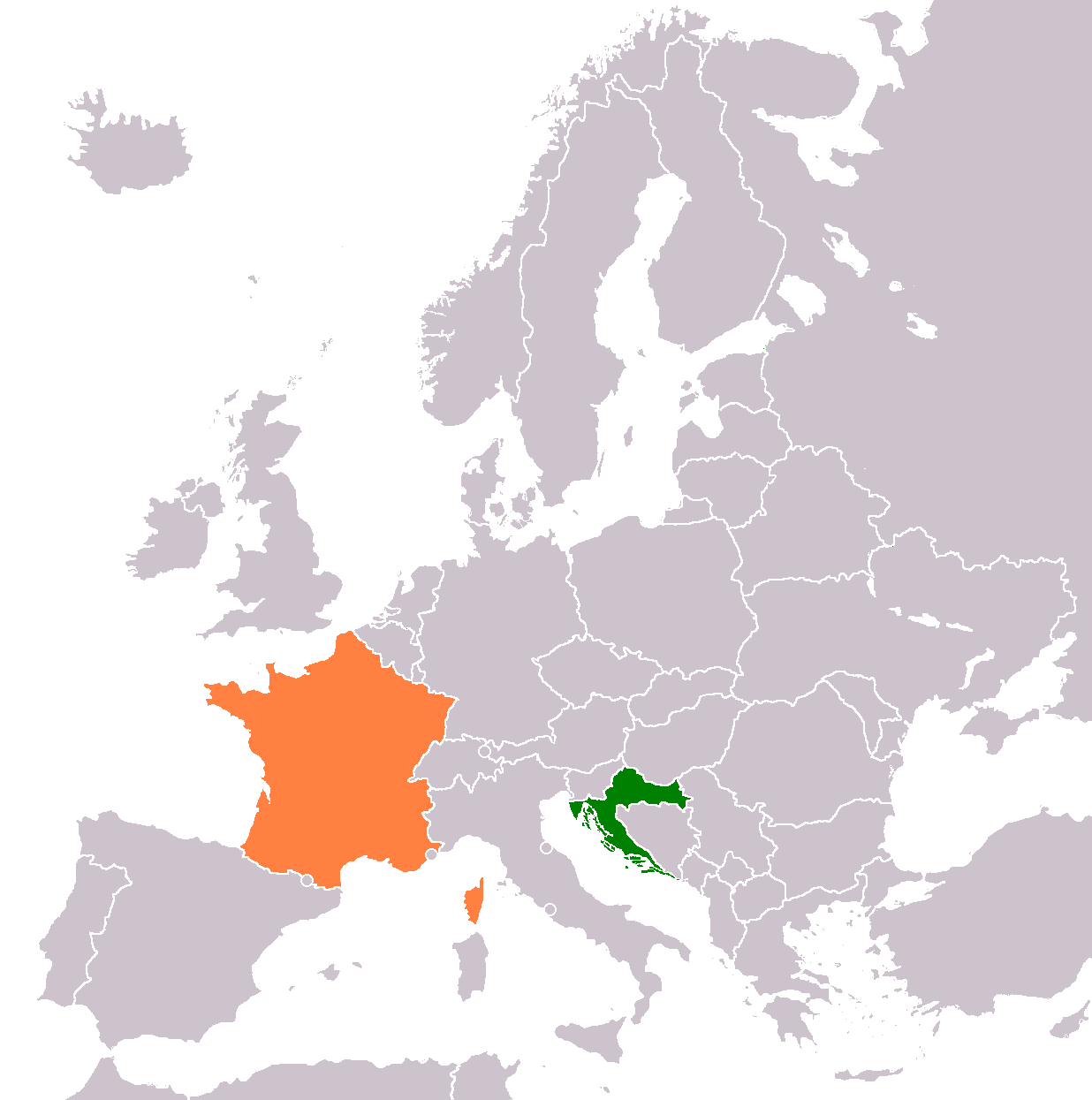

- Croatia: France

Diplomatic mission
- Embassy of Croatia in Paris, France: Embassy of France in Zagreb, Croatia

Envoy
- Ambassador Zvonimir Frka-Petešić: Ambassador; Fabien Fieschi

The foreign relations between Croatia and France are bound together by shared history, political development, geography, religion and cultural commonalities. With an extensive history between the two states, modern relations commenced in 1992, following the independence of Croatia. Relations are warm and friendly with strong bilateral collaboration. The two nations have connectivity through tourism, immigration, foreign aid, and economic mutualism.

French interests in Croatia are centered on the state's stabilizing influence in Southeast Europe and extending the global reach of jointly-held Western ideals. France and Croatia are close military allies with their historical alliance spanning centuries. Both share a robust defense industrial base and membership in NATO. Croatia was part of France during the early 1800s as the Illyrian Provinces under the First French Empire. They maintain multiple free-trade agreements between themselves in the Eurozone and share the euro (€) currency.

They share Roman Catholicism as a major religion, football as a national sport, and tri-color flags. Both countries are members the European Union, United Nations, and the World Trade Organization. Croatia has been an observer of the Francophonie since 2004. France maintains an embassy in Zagreb with Croatia holding an embassy in Paris; there are also a French consulate in Split, Croatia and Croatian consulates in Lyon and Toulouse.

== History ==
=== Origins ===
The connection between France and Croatia began with the spread of monasteries in Croatia by French Benedictine monks during the 800s and early 900s. Religious diffusion between the two regions began with France's influence on Croatian Catholicism. In 925, Croatia was elevated to the status of Kingdom and the notions of nobility quickly followed. Over the coming centuries Croatian nobility assumed French practices to great controversy. This contributed to wide spread political and social elitism among the nobles and monarch. The nobility regarded the peasant class as an irrelevant substrata of people which lead to high causality revolts and beheadings as well as sporadic periods of intense domestic violence. In 1040, French liturgical books and reliquaries were brought to Zagreb to create its first Diocese.

French historian of the Fourth Crusade, Geoffroi de Villehardouin, described in Old French Zagreb as "one of the best fortified cities in the world" later adding "that no more beautiful, stronger nor richer city could be found." During the 14th century, French began to be diffused into Croatian society starting in Zagreb. Many of the Croatian elite studied at the French Sorbonne during the later 15th century and influenced the political landscape of the country for decades to come. One of the most prominent members was Saro Gučetić, who, upon request of the French King Francis I with Suleiman the Magnificent, negotiated secret pacts with neighboring countries. The expansion of literature in France during the early 16th century lead to many Croatian writers to be translated into French for the public. The first diplomatic relation between France and Croatia was the establishment of a consulate in Dubrovnik. The growing connection between the two countries was known as the frančezarije, and was formalized with the first French Masonic lodge in Croatia. The French government recruited Croatian soldiers to defend New France – part of modern-day Canada – in 1758. As the 1789 French Revolution progressed, the ideas of enlightenment deeply influenced Croatian society, which lead to the creation of Jacobin clubs in Zagreb and Dubrovnik.

=== 19th century ===
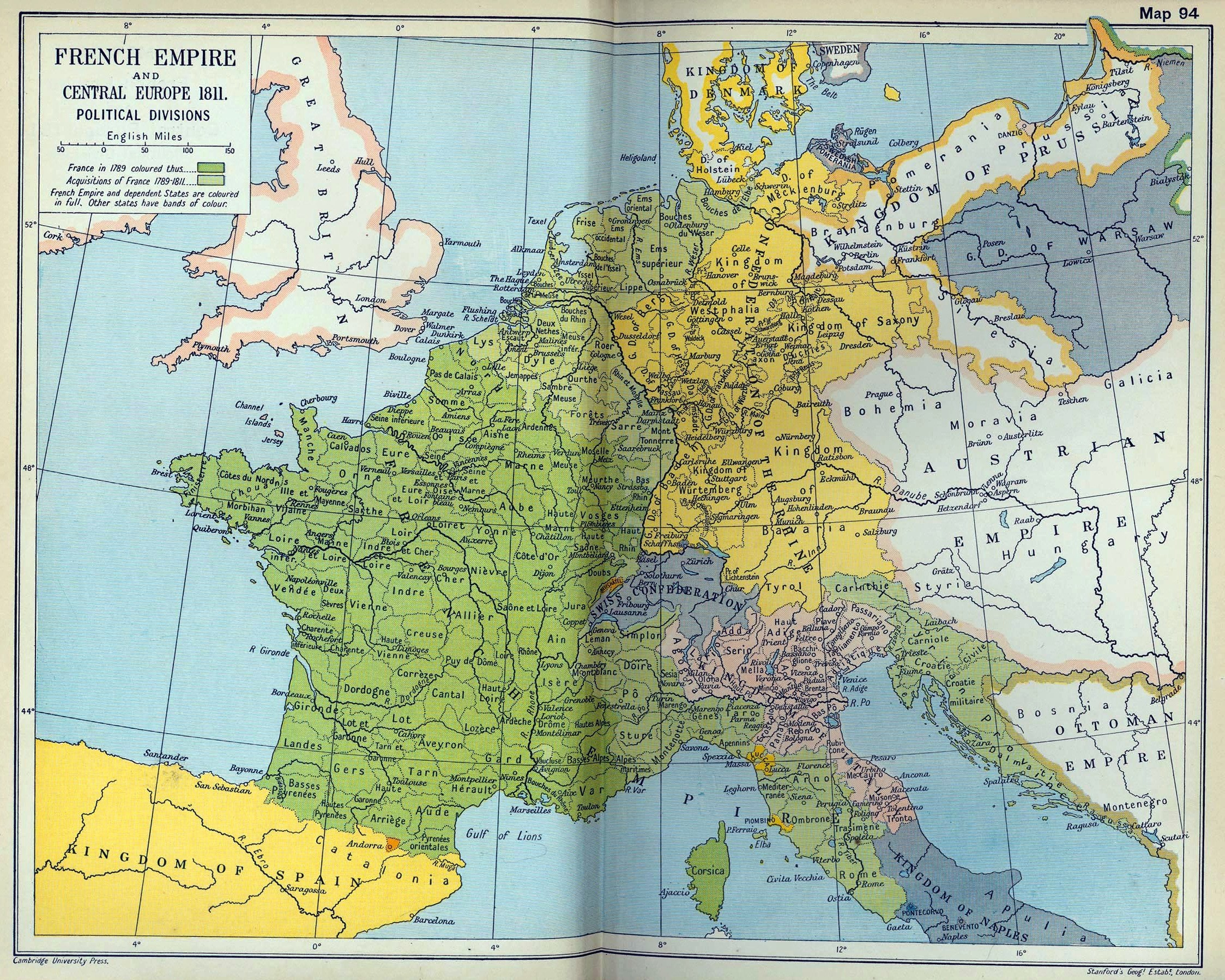
Croatia was part of France during the First French Empire, mapped in 1811.

During the expansion of Napoleon Bonaparte's First French Empire, large parts of Croatia were controlled by the French leading to the creation of the Illyrian Provinces. In 1809, Napoleon Bonaparte and his administration established this territory in Ljubljana (Laybach) as an extension against the Austrian Empire in what mostly comprised modern day Croatia and parts of Slovenia. The provinces had four governors during its existence: Auguste de Marmont, Henri Gatien Bertrand, Jean-Andoche Junot, and Joseph Fouché. During French rule the official languages of the autonomous province were French, Croatian, Italian, German, and Slovene. Although the French did not entirely abolish the feudal system, their rule familiarized in more detail the inhabitants of the Illyrian Provinces with the achievements of the French Revolution and with contemporary bourgeois society. They introduced equality before the law, compulsory military service and a uniform tax system, and also abolished certain tax privileges, introduced modern administration, separated powers between the state and the church (the introduction of the civil wedding, keeping civil registration of births etc.), and nationalized the judiciary. The occupants made all the citizens theoretically equal under the law for the first time. In 1812, a significant Croatian force (four regiments) fought for Napleon's Grande Armée during his invasion of Russia.

French rule in the Illyrian Provinces was short-lived, yet it significantly contributed to greater national self-confidence and awareness of freedoms, especially in the Slavic nations as exampled in post Yugoslavian independence Croatia, and Slovenia. The influence of the Illyrian Territories and the rejection of Austrian rule, has prompted a French cultural diffusion and national appreciation in certain areas of the countries that made up the providences that last to this day. In Croatia, the cities and towns of Zagreb, Split, Rijeka, Osijek, Zadar, and Velika Gorica have distinct French and Illyrian customs that remain a remnant of 19th century French rule. In Slovenia and Montenegro, streets and small regions are named after governors of the providences and Bonaparte. During this time the spread of Illyrian movement was expansive in France and lead to the creation of the seminal work: Les peuples de l’Autriche et de la Turquie; histoire contemporaine des Illyriens, des Magyars, des Roumains et des Polonais, which served as an "introductory study on Croatia and the Illyrian Movement." During the 1860s, the Croatian school system began to introduce French as a language of study and formally integrated into the national curriculum in 1876. French writer Émile Zola – a descendant of Zadar – was one of the most prominent writers of this movement.

=== 20th century ===
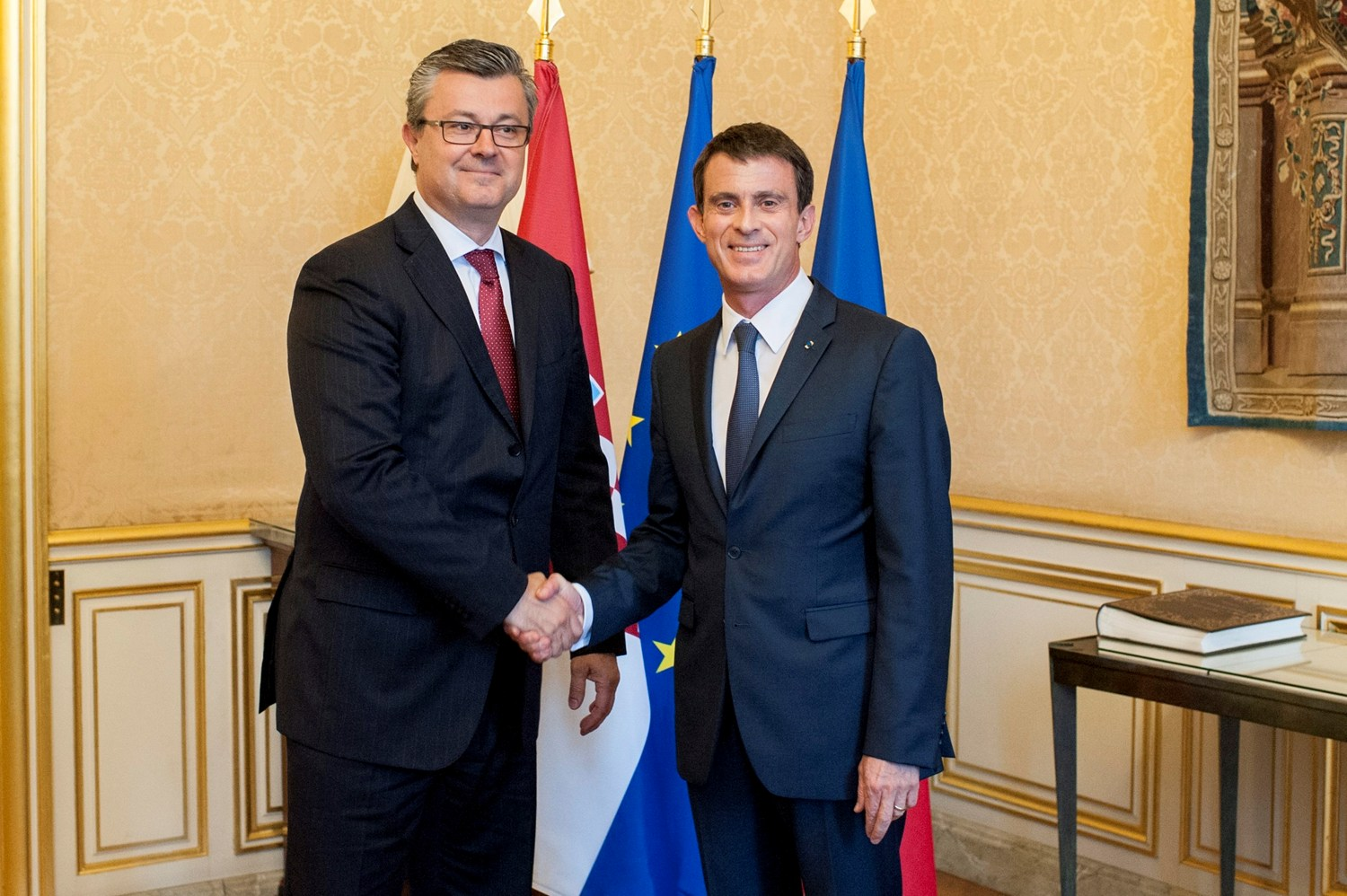
Croatian Prime Minister Tihomir Orešković meets with his French counterparty Manuel Valls, 2017

During the later 1950s, the capital of Croatia became a cultural center mostly due to the fact that Yugoslavia was not aligned with any sovereign state. French philosopher Jean-Paul Sartre visited Zagreb in 1960 and met with prominent Croatian writers and philosophers. With the collapse of Yugoslavia, Croatia struggled to be internationally recognized. French intellectuals such as Mirko Dražen Grmek–a native Croat and naturalized Frenchman–helped attract high-profile French figures to recognize Croatia.

=== Modern relations ===
France recognized Croatia on 15 January 1992 and established diplomatic relations three months later. The two countries have since had multiple inter-parliamentary exchanges. In 2009, Croatia served as a temporary member of the United Nations Security Council with France. France created Croatia's "administrative adaptation processes" that helped it become the 28th EU state. In January 2013, Croatia's EU Treaty was ratified by the French Parliament. French Minister Delegate for European Affairs Thierry Repentin visited Zagreb in 2013 in support of its membership in the EU. President of Croatia Ivo Josipović was invited by Francois Hollande to celebrate the National Day of France in July 2013. Minister of State for European Affairs Harlem Désir visited Croatia on July 14, 2015 to celebrate French Independence Day and met with Prime Minister Zoran Milanović. After the 2015 Paris terrorist attacks the government of Croatia made November 16, 2015 a national mourning day in the country and flew their flags half mast. Milanović marched in Paris with the "March for Democracy" to grieve the victims.

Following two earthquakes in Zagreb and in Petrinja in 2020, the French government sent humanitarian aid to Croatia. French president Emmanuel Macron visited Zagreb for a two-day visit in 2021, becoming the first sitting French president to visit Croatia.

== Military cooperation ==
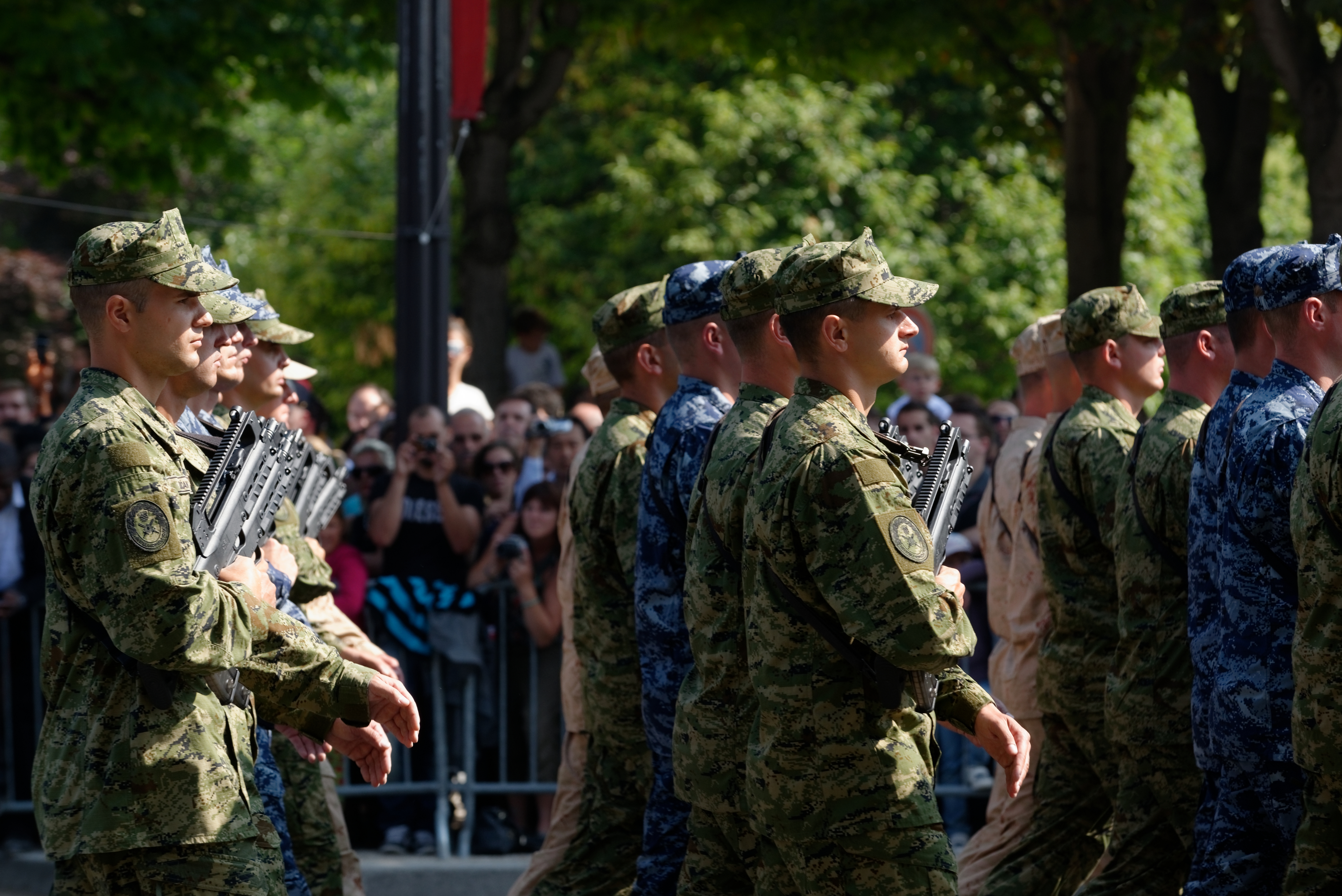
A Croatian detachment during France's Bastille Day military parade, 2013

Due to their historic relationship, Croatia and France are close military allies and share a robust bilateral defense industrial base. Croatia joined France in NATO in 2009, effectively establishing a defense pact through Article 5. France is the largest foreign supplier of Croatian military equipment in Europe. Croatia acquired 12 Dassault Rafale fighter-jets from France between 2021 and 2025 in a large bilateral arms deal.

After the 2022 Tu-141 drone crash in Zagreb, France dispatched two fighter jets from aircraft carrier Charles de Gaulle in a show of military strength for Croatia. Croatia purchased surface-to-air missile (SAM) air defense systems Mistral and VL MICA from France in 2023. French soldier Jean-Michel Nicolier was posthumously awarded Croatian citizenship in 2025 for his defense of Vukovar, Croatia during the Battle of Vukovar in 1991.

== Economic activity ==
There is significant economic activity between the two nations on a bilateral basis as well as within the European Union. They share euro currency through with their memberships in the Eurozone. French companies tend to develop the transport infrastructure in Croatia. The construction of the Zagreb Airport through the Bouygues-Aéroports de Paris (ADP) investment of €250-€300 million in 2012 substantially increased the public perception of France in Croatia. Their trading agreement and activity reached a market value of €535 million in 2015. France accounted for 2.3% of Croatia's total trade in 2014, making it the 10th largest trading partner. French exports to Croatia amounted to €364 million in 2015. Croatia supplied €171.3 million worth of imports to France in 2015. France is the seventh-largest investor in Croatia with annual investments of €651 million in FDI.

== Sister cities ==
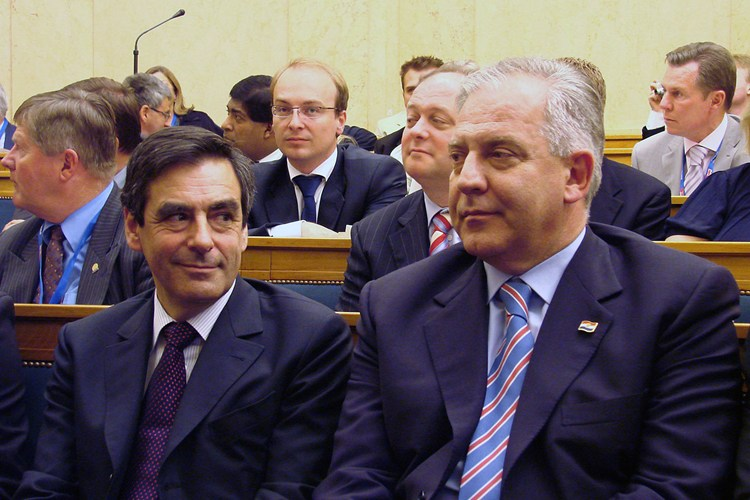
French prime minister François Fillon (left), with his Croatian counterpart Ivo Sanader (right), 2008

Croatia and France share five twin towns and sister cities between themselves.

- (France) Rueil-Malmaison / (France) Paris and (Croatia) Dubrovnik
- (France) Villefranche-de-Rouergue / (France) Aveyron and (Croatia) Pula
- (France) Auxerre, Burgundy and (Croatia) Varaždin
- (France) Romans-sur-Isère / (France) Drôme and (Croatia) Zadar
- (France) Saint-Dié-des-Vosges and (Croatia) Crikvenica

The French government expressed interest in May 2017 of "twinning" with the following Croatian cities:

- (France) Marseille and (Croatia) Split
- (France) Bourges and (Croatia) Šibenik
- (France) Le Havre and (Croatia) Rijeka

== International sport ==
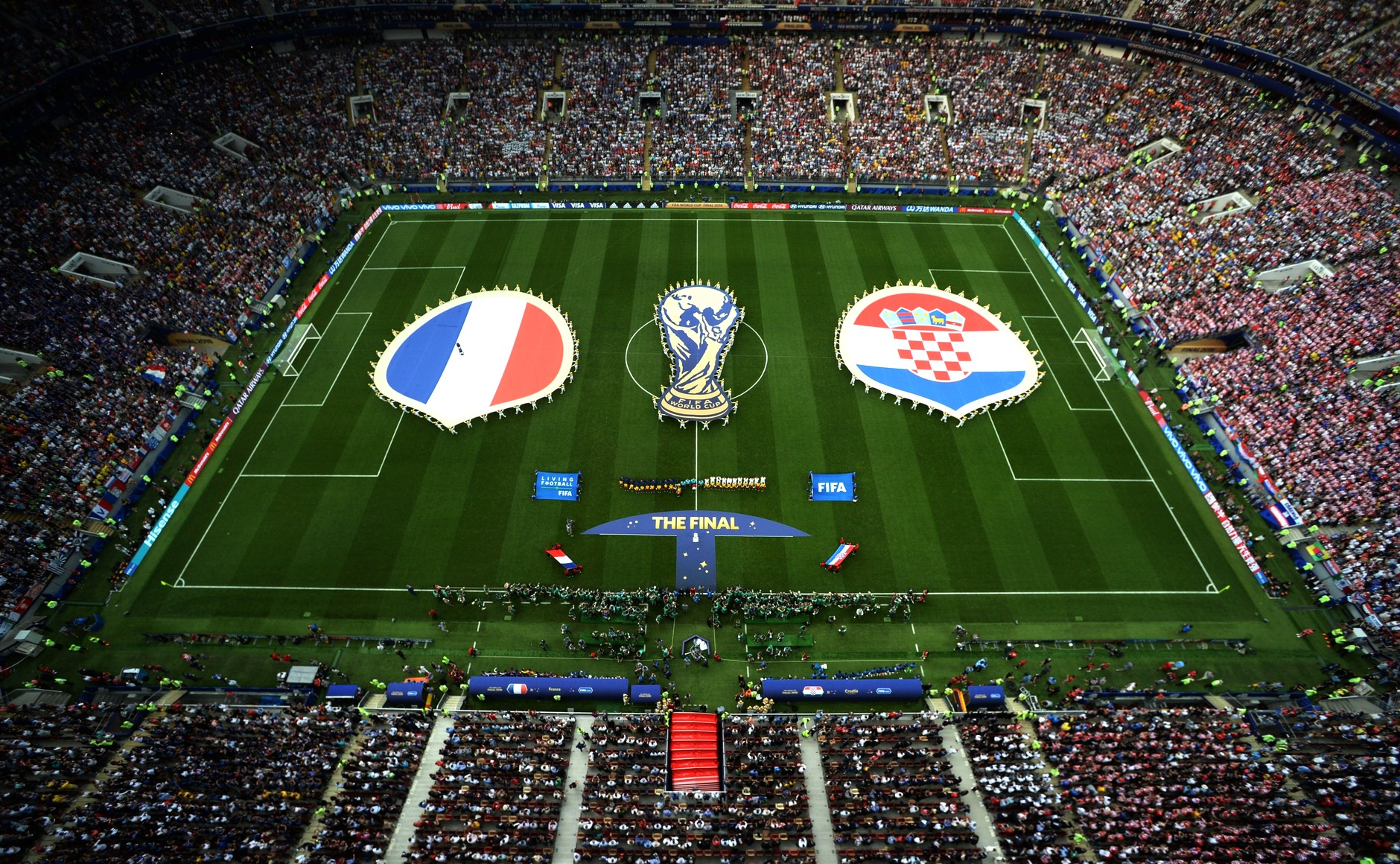
The 2018 World Cup Final is seen as the pinnacle of their football rivalry, raising the international profile of their bilateral relationship.

International sport has historically supported mutual tourism and foreign trade between the two countries. The football teams of France and of Croatia began competing against each other in a series of friendly exhibition games, but since 1998 their encounters have become increasingly competitive. As both countries have the red-white-blue tricolor, matches between the two are nicknamed Le derby tricolore ("Tricolor Derby") or Trobojnica ("Tricolor" game). During the 1998 World Cup, both France and Croatia reached their then-pinnacle of international prowess after the former won the tournament after defeating the latter who took third place. Twenty years later, the two teams battled the 2018 World Cup final where France overcame Croatia 4–2 to secure the trophy. Similarly to 1998, the match with France elevated Croatia to its highest-ever ranking with runners-up positioning. The two teams have competed against each other twelve times with France winning seven matches and Croatia winning two, with three draws.

The national tennis teams of Croatia and of France contested the 2018 Davis Cup final with Croatia winning its second title.

== International organizations ==
While France is a founding member of the EU and NATO, Croatia joined NATO in 2009 and the EU in 2013.

== Embassies ==
- Croatia has an embassy in Paris.
- France has an embassy in Zagreb.
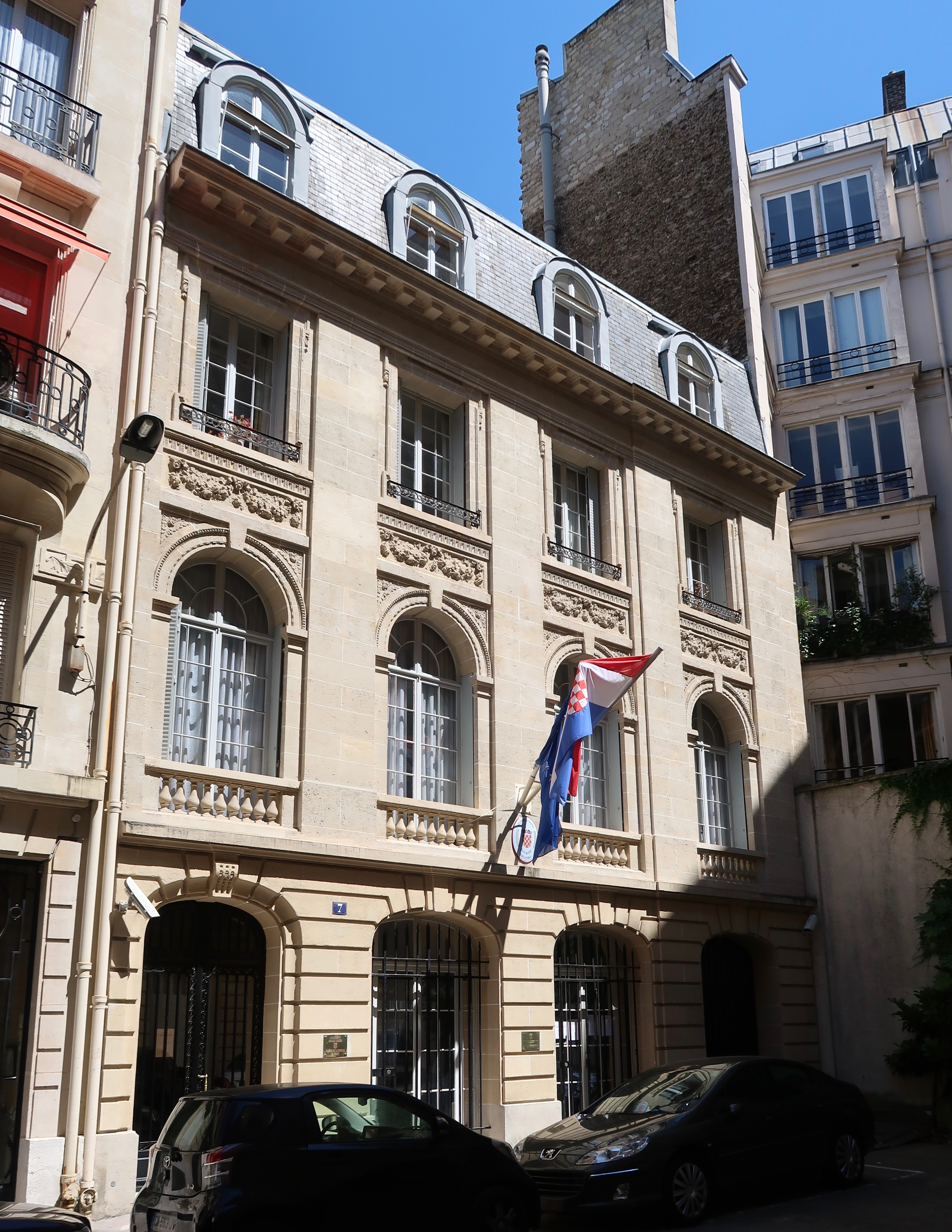
Embassy of Croatia in Paris

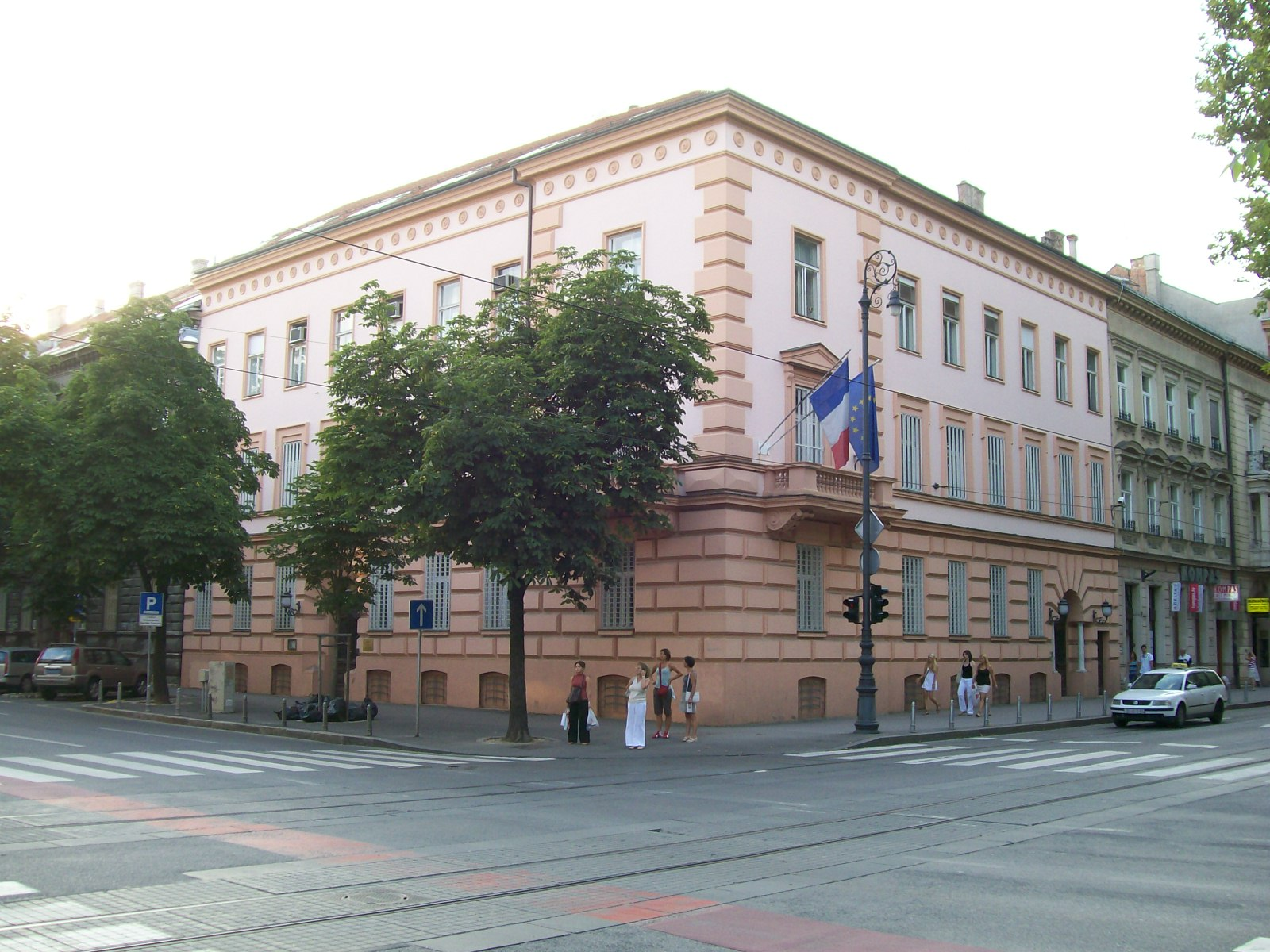
Embassy of France in Zagreb

== See also ==
- Foreign relations of Croatia
- Foreign relations of France
- NATO-EU relations
