= Dražen Erdemović =

Bosnian war criminal

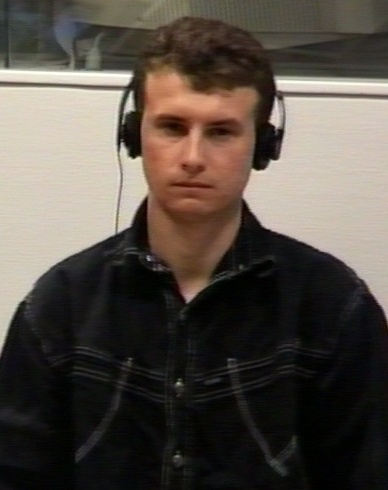
- Erdemović at his trial before the International Criminal Tribunal for the former Yugoslavia
- Born: 25 November 1971 (age 54); Tuzla, SR Bosnia and Herzegovina, SFR Yugoslavia
- Military career
- Allegiance: Yugoslavia; Bosnia and Herzegovina; Herzeg-Bosnia; Republika Srpska
- Branch: Yugoslav People's Army (1990–1992); Army of the Republic of Bosnia and Herzegovina (1992); Croatian Defence Council (1992–1993); Army of Republika Srpska (1994–1995)
- Rank: Soldier
- Unit: 10th Sabotage Detachment
- Conflicts: Croatian War of Independence: Battle of Vukovar; Bosnian War: Siege of Srebrenica; Srebrenica massacre

Dražen Erdemović (Serbian Cyrillic: Дражен Ердемовић; born 25 November 1971) is a Bosnian former soldier who fought during the Bosnian War for the Army of Republika Srpska (VRS) and was later sentenced for his participation in the 1995 Srebrenica genocide.

== Background ==
Erdemović was born in Tuzla, Bosnia and Herzegovina, Yugoslavia to a Croat mother and a Croat father. A Tito sympathizer, at the 1990 Bosnian general election, he voted for the Union of Reform Forces. He served his military service in Belgrade since December 1990. After joining the Yugoslav People's Army (JNA), he took part in the Battle of Vukovar while stationed in Petrovci and Marinci. After completing his military service, he returned from Belgrade to Tuzla in March 1992, where he was harassed for fighting on the "Chetnik" side in Vukovar. In May, he was drafted to the Army of the Republic of Bosnia and Herzegovina (ARBiH), which he was a member of between July and October.

In November or December 1992, Erdemović joined the 115th Brigade "Nikola Šubić Zrinski" of the Croatian Defence Council (HVO). Rebellious during his HVO service, Erdemović tried to smuggle 76 Serb civilians from the Tuzla area over Majevica to Republika Srpska in October 1993. He was caught and incarcerated by both HVO and ARBiH. Receiving a five-day leave from the former, he uses it to flee to Republika Srpska on 3 November 1993.

While in Republika Srpska, he spent time in Bijeljina, Janja, Vrbas (Serbia), Foča and Balatun. Desperate for money to escape to Switzerland with his Serb wife and newborn son, Erdemović joined the VRS 10th Sabotage Detachment, a part of the Army of Republika Srpska (VRS), in Bijeljina.

== Srebrenica ==
In July 1995, Erdemović and his unit were sent to Branjevo military farm in the village of Pilica, north of Zvornik. After the VRS forces took over Srebrenica on 11 July, the Serbs began to send male Bosniaks POW to various locations for execution. One of those places was the farm in Pilica, 15 kilometers from the border with Serbia, where Erdemović and the 10th Sabotage Detachment were tasked with executing about 1,200 Bosniak POW men and boys between the ages of approximately 17 and 60 years, who had surrendered to the members of the Bosnian Serb police or army near Srebrenica.

On 16 July, the prisoners were bused to the farm and gunned down in groups of ten. Erdemović allegedly resisted the order, but was then told that he either shot them, or hand his gun to another, and join those to be killed. After the murders were over the victims were buried in mass graves. While it is unknown exactly how many people were personally killed by Erdemović, he estimated it was around 70 men and boys.

After the massacre, Erdemović returned home, but reportedly felt guilt-ridden over the crimes he had committed. Fellow soldiers of the 10th Sabotage put pressure on him not to say anything, including a Serbian soldier, Stanko Savanović. One evening, while meeting in an undisclosed bar, Savanović shot Erdemović, wounding him badly in the torso. In early 1996, Erdemović sought out an ABC field reporter and testified on camera about what happened at Srebrenica. Several days later, he was arrested and charged with war crimes in the International Criminal Tribunal for the former Yugoslavia.

== Trial ==
At the Tribunal, Erdemović identified himself as a Bosnian Croat and a speaker of the Yugoslav language. The Erdemović case was significant in the Tribunal being it was the first application of the defence of duress, claiming that his life had been threatened and that he had no choice. It was found that it did not absolve him of guilt, but could be a mitigating factor in his sentencing. On 29 November 1996, Erdemović was sentenced to ten years in prison, convicted of murder as a crime against humanity. He was the first person to enter a guilty plea at the Tribunal, and was the only member of the 10th Sabotage Detachment to actually be tried for the war crimes, while the rest remained on the Tribunal's most wanted list.

Erdemović appealed and his sentence was later reduced by ICTY to five years in 1998, accepting that he committed the offences under threat of death had he disobeyed the order. Credit was given for time served since 28 March 1996. On 13 August 1999, he was granted early release. Upon serving his sentence in a Norwegian prison, Erdemović entered the Tribunal Court's witness protection program and testified at the trial of Slobodan Milošević:

"I wish to say that I feel sorry for all the victims, not only for the ones who were killed then at that farm, I feel sorry for all the victims in the former Bosnia and Herzegovina regardless of their nationality. I have lost many very good friends of all nationalities only because of that war, and I am convinced that all of them, all of my friends, were not in favour of a war. I am convinced of that. But simply they had no other choice. This war came and there was no way out. The same happened to me. Because of my case, because of everything that happened, I of my own will, without being either arrested and interrogated or put under pressure, admitted even before I was arrested in the Federal Republic of Yugoslavia, I admitted to what I did to this journalist and I told her at that time that I wanted to go to the International Tribunal, that I wanted to help the International Tribunal understand what happened to ordinary people like myself in Yugoslavia... in the Federal Republic of Yugoslavia I admitted to what I did before the authorities, judicial authorities, and the authorities of the Ministry of the Interior, like I did here. My lawyer, when he first arrived here, he told me, "Dražen, can you change your mind, your decision? I do not know what can happen. I do not know what will happen." I told him because of those victims, because of my consciousness, because of my life, because of my child and my wife, I cannot change what I said to this journalist and what I said in Novi Sad, because of the peace of my mind, my soul, my honesty, because of the victims and war and because of everything. Although I knew that my family, my parents, my brother, my sister, would have problems because of that, I did not want to change it. Because of everything that happened I feel terribly sorry, but I could not do anything. When I could do something, I did it."

== Later life ==
In 2009, Jutarnji list came into possession of a document through which it was evident that Erdemović had requested Croatian citizenship in 2006 through the Croatian embassy in The Hague. The embassy and the Ministry of the Interior both refused to confirm that information, as they also refused to reveal whether he sought citizenship through his Croat origin or as an ordinary foreigner.

== In the media ==
The story of Erdemović's trial in the International Criminal Tribunal for the Former Yugoslavia forms the basis of the 2005 play A Patch of Earth, written by Kitty Felde and collected in the anthology The Theatre of Genocide: Four Plays about Mass Murder in Rwanda, Bosnia, Cambodia, and Armenia (University of Wisconsin Press, 2008).
