= Croatia–Finland relations =

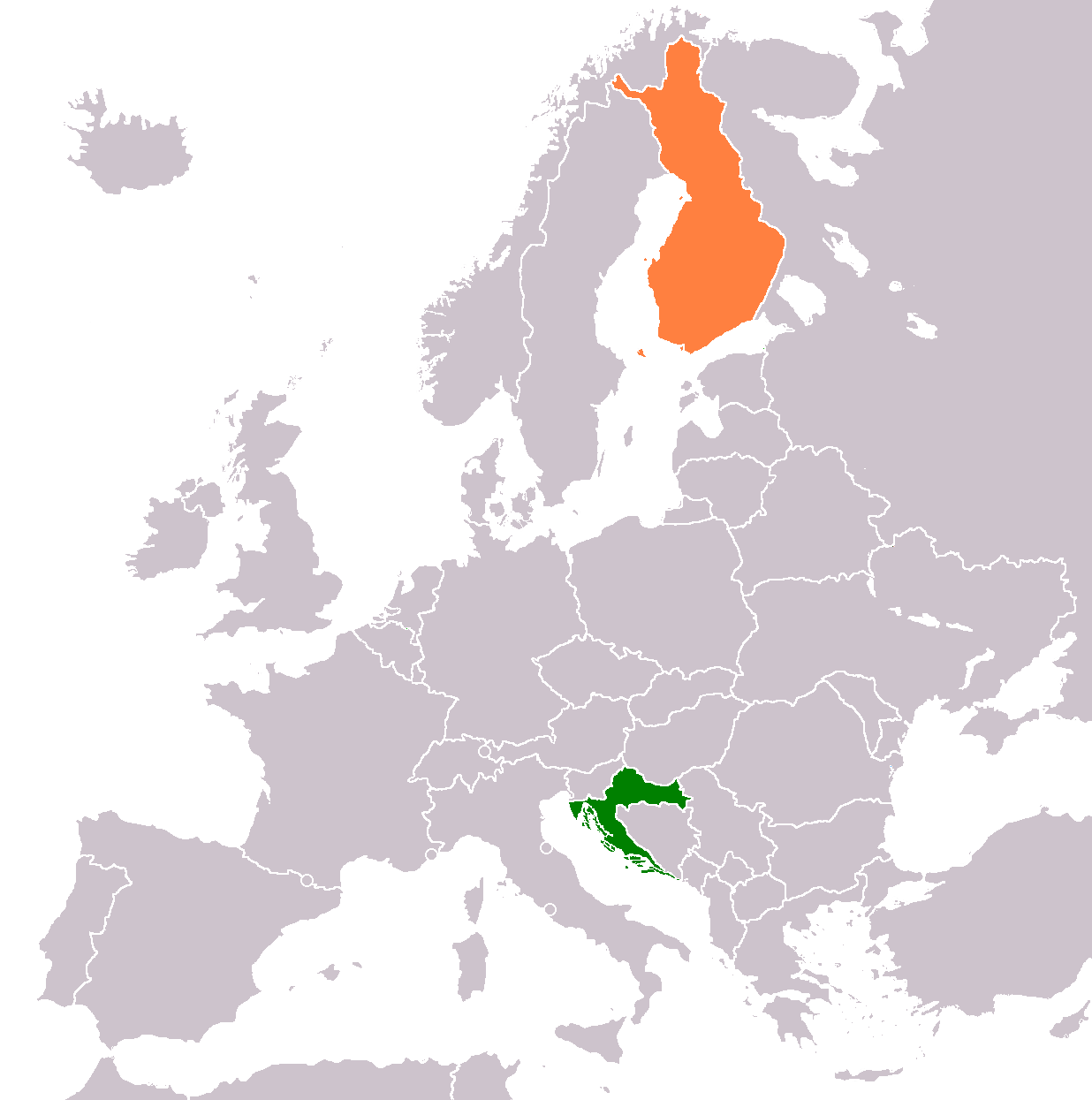

- Croatia: Finland

Diplomatic mission
- Embassy of Croatia, Helsinki: Embassy of Finland, Zagreb

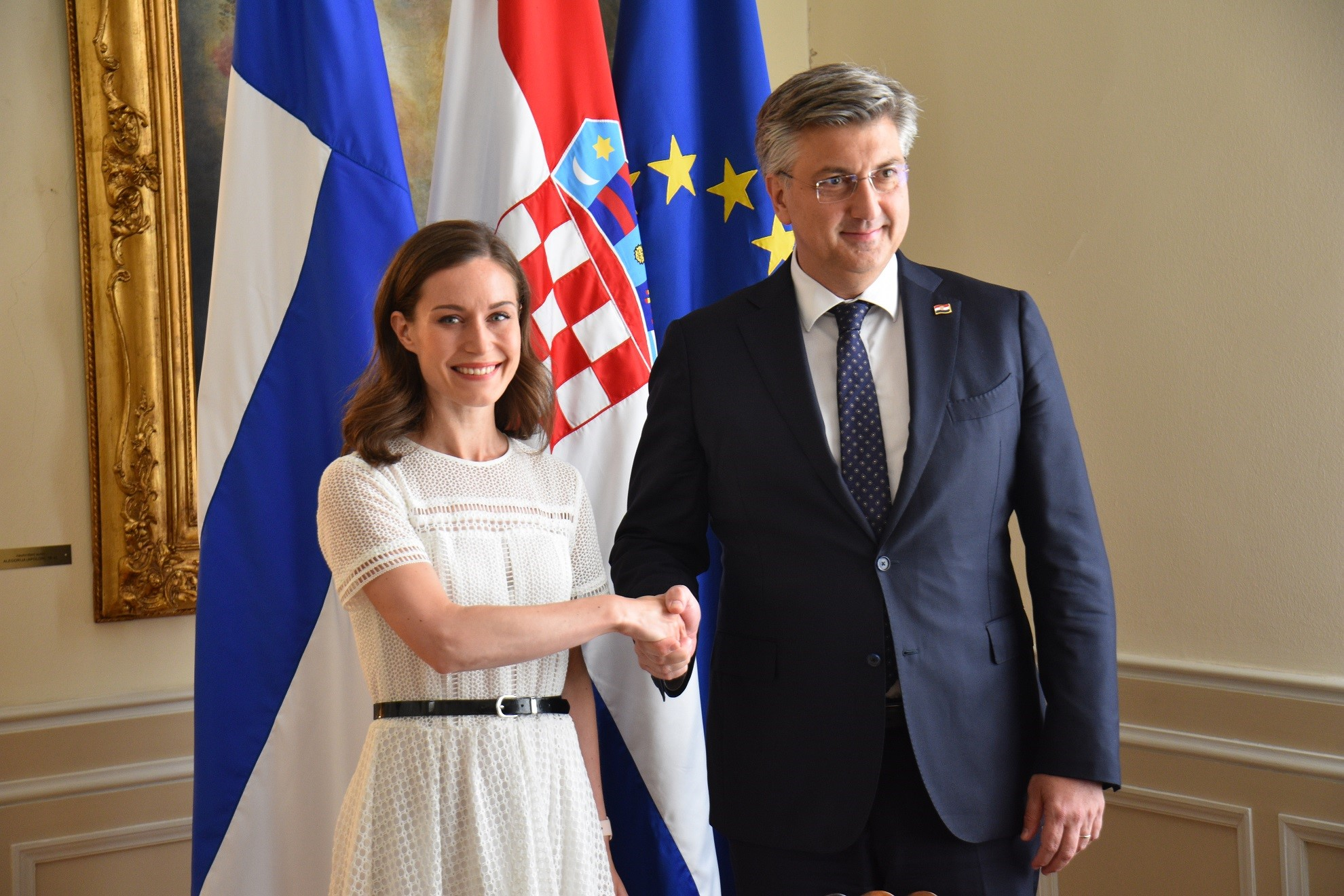
Finnish Prime Minister Sanna Marin met with the Prime Minister of Croatia Andrej Plenković in 2022

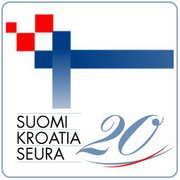
Finnish Croatian Society 20 year anniversary

Croatia–Finland relations are foreign relations between Croatia and Finland. Finland recognised the Independent State of Croatia, a Nazi puppet state, on 2 July 1941. Finland broke off diplomatic relations on 20 September 1944. Finland re-recognised Croatia on 17 January 1992. Both countries re-established diplomatic relations on 19 February 1992. Croatia has an embassy in Helsinki. Finland has an embassy in Zagreb. Both countries are full members of the Council of Europe, European Union, Organization for Security and Co-operation in Europe and NATO.

== History ==
=== Kingdom of Yugoslavia ===
There were no official relations between Croatia and Finland during the time that Croatia was part of the Kingdom of Yugoslavia. However, a Finnish consulate was established in Zagreb in 1934. Onni Talas was a prominent figure in Yugoslavia at the time, focusing on Croatia–Serbia relations.

=== Independent State of Croatia ===
On 10 May 1941, Finland granted de jure recognition to the Independent State of Croatia, a Nazi and Italian fascist puppet state led by the Ustaše. Finland and Nazi Germany were allies during the Continuation War. During this time, the only countries recognizing the Independent State of Croatia were Nazi puppet states or allies. Finnish Foreign Minister Rolf Witting stressed that "Finnish and Croatian peoples are fighting together against a common enemy".

However, there were tensions between Croatia and Finland. The Ustaše targeted all individuals of Jewish ancestry, regardless of their religious affiliation, which included Pavle Berkeš, the Finnish general consul, a Jew who had converted to Catholicism in 1932. Berkeš was temporarily arrested and only freed at the request of the Onni Tales and Finnish government. Later, he was removed as consul, but while leaving the country, he was once again detained requiring Onni Tales to intervene once more.

Following the end of the Continuation War, on 20 September 1944, Finland officially broke off relations with the Ustaše.

=== Republic of Croatia ===
Following Croatian independence in October 1991, Finland officially recognized the country on 17 January, 1992, with formal diplomatic relations being established two days later on the 19th.

In 2007, during a discussion of bilateral relations, Ilpo Manninen, then Finnish ambassador to Croatia, expressed that Finland would support Croatia's accession to the EU. Later, in 2012, Finland officially supported Croatia's accession to the EU.

As of 2012, Croatia and Finland had six active treaties, relating to: diplomatic recognition, visas, investment, transportation, defense, and research and development of military technologies.

In December 2012, a seminar between the Nordic countries, which includes Finland, was held in Zagreb, discussing investment and corporate responsibility.

In November 2016, when celebrating 25 years of Croatian independence, Božo Petrov and Maria Lohela met to discuss bilateral relations, stating that they both wished for their countries to establish economic ties. Lohela recognized that Croatia was a popular tourist destination among Finnish people, and she wished that Finland might become the same for Croats.

In April 2018, Sauli Niinistö visited Zagreb, where he met with Kolinda Grabar-Kitarović to discuss peace and defense of the Baltic regions.

In April 2022, Croatian president Zoran Milanović threatened to block ratification of Sweden and Finland's NATO accession until Bosnia and Herzegovina implemented electoral reforms regarding Croatian representation in government. However, he still voiced his support for the two countries to join NATO. In June 2022, Croatian prime minister Andrej Plenković met with Finnish prime minister Sanna Marin to discuss the issue, and in July, Croatia fully ratified Finland's NATO membership application. However, in 2023, Milanović once again stated his belief that Sweden and Finland's inclusion should be conditional on election reform in Bosnia and Herzegovina. In August 2022, Finnish company Taaleri Energia and Croatian company Encro joined together to build wind farms in Croatia.

In June 2025, Finland established a new ambassador to Croatia, Sirpa Oksanen.

== European Union and NATO ==
Finland joined the EU and NATO in 1995, and 2023, respectively. Finland supported Croatia's aspiration to join the EU, and ratified Croatia's accession in 2012. Croatia supported Finland's aspiration to join NATO, and ratified Finland's accession in 2022. Croatia joined NATO in 2009 and the EU in 2013.

== Resident diplomatic missions ==
- Croatia has an embassy in Helsinki.
- Finland has an embassy in Zagreb.
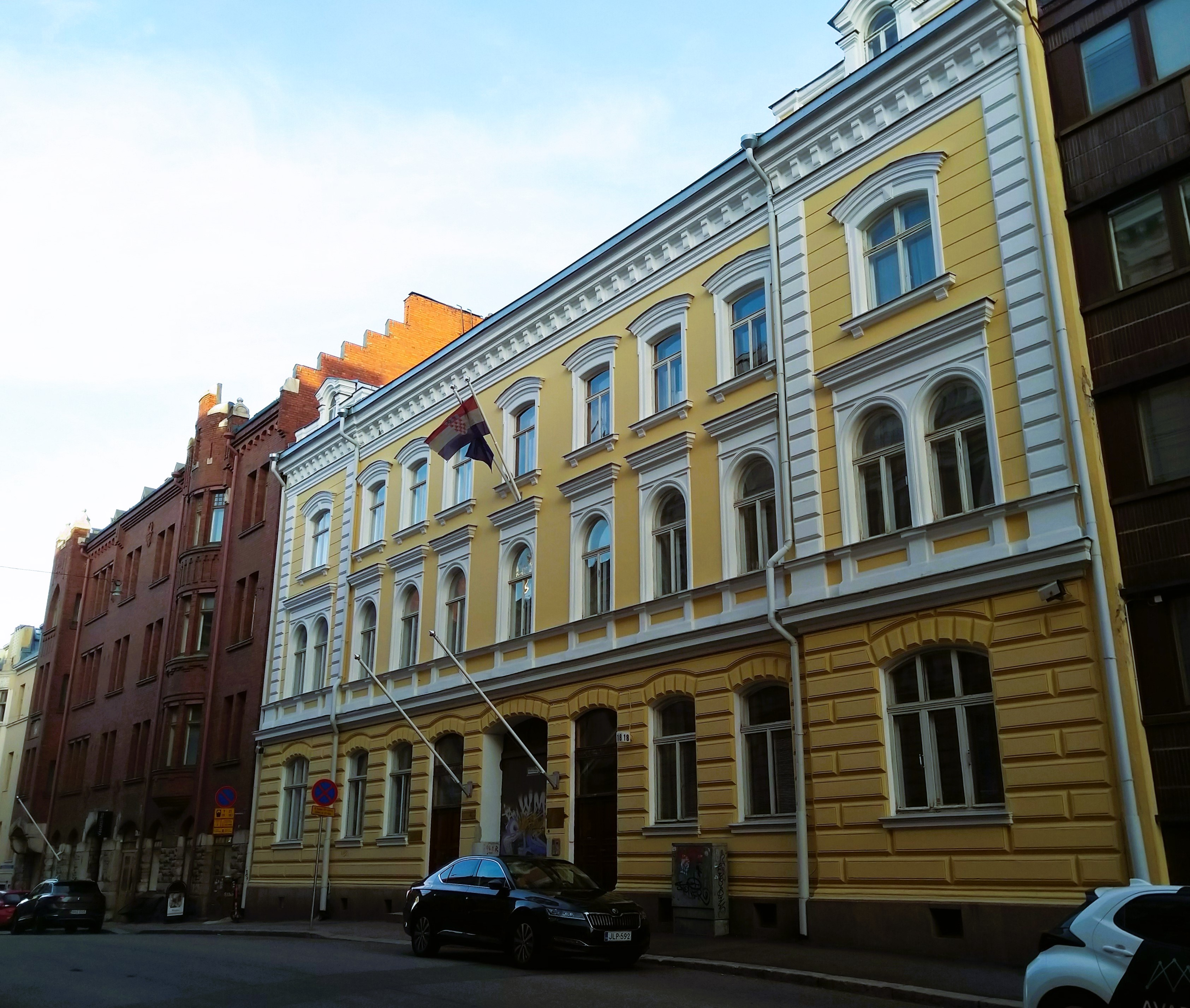
Embassy of Croatia in Helsinki

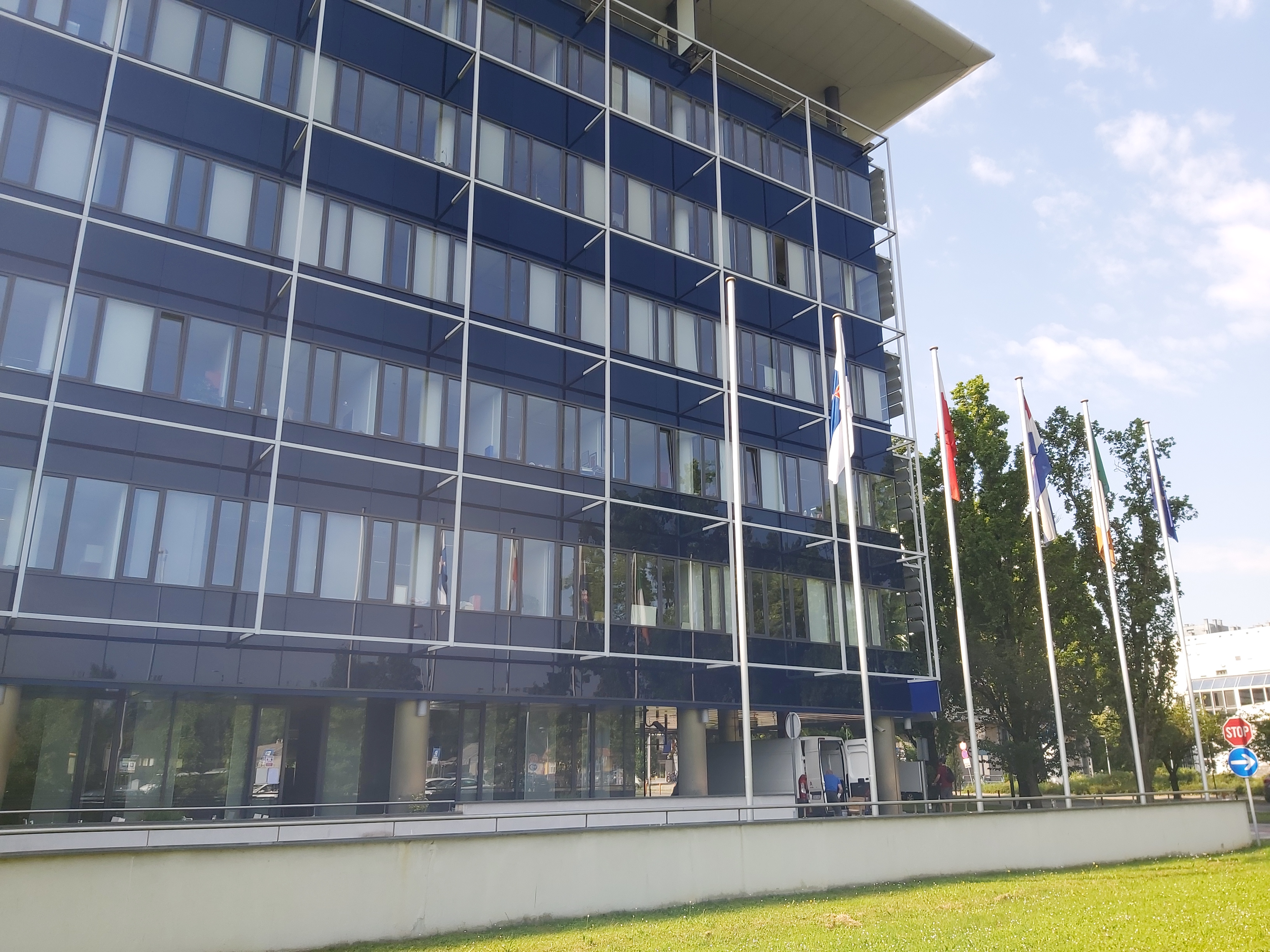
Embassy of Finland in Zagreb

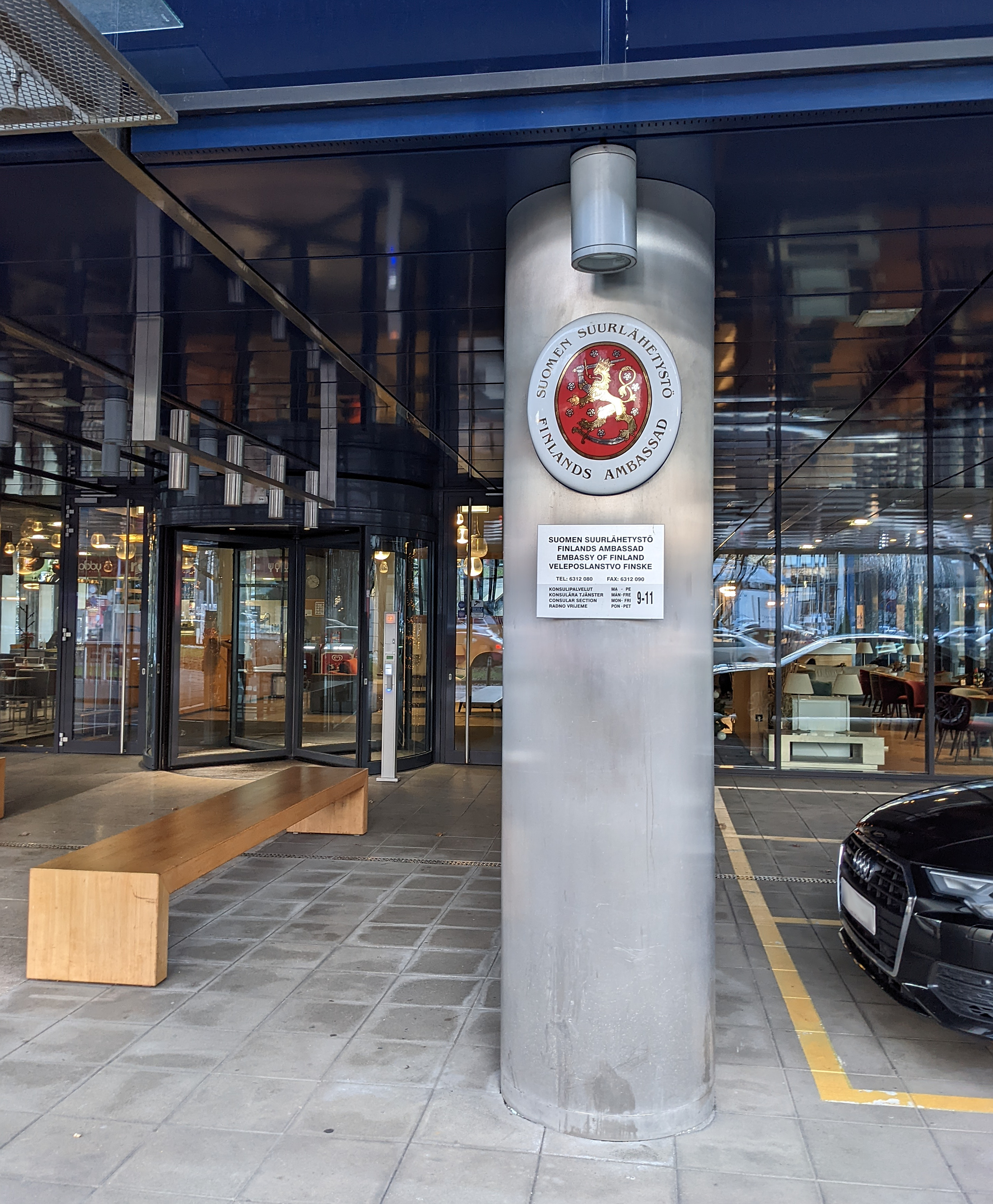
Entrance of Embassy of Finland at Eurocenter

== Notes ==
- The Embassy of Croatia in Helsinki is also accredited to Estonia.
- The Embassy of Finland in Zagreb is also accredited to Bosnia and Herzegovina and the Holy See.

== See also ==
- Foreign relations of Croatia
- Foreign relations of Finland
- Finland–Yugoslavia relations
