= Dražin Do =

Dražin Do Дражин До
- Village
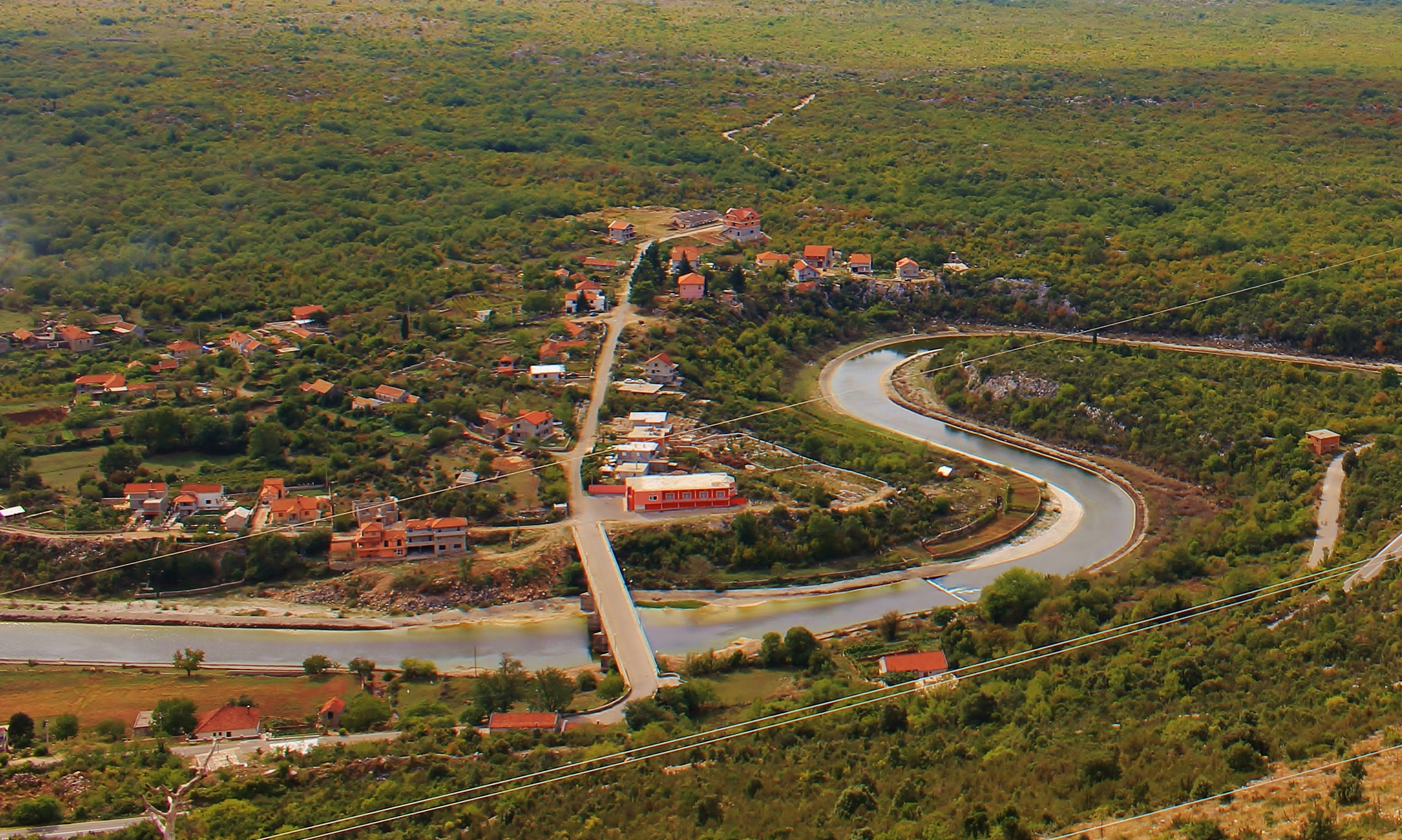
- Dražin Do

- Location within Bosnia and Herzegovina
- Coordinates: 42°43′N 18°18′E
- Country: Bosnia and Herzegovina
- Entity: Republika Srpska
- Municipality: Trebinje
- Time zone: UTC+1 (CET)
  - Summer (DST): UTC+2 (CEST)

Dražin Do (Serbian Cyrillic: Дражин До) is a village in the municipality of Trebinje, Republika Srpska, Bosnia and Herzegovina.
