= Dražen Prćić =

Croatian writer

- Born: 1 November 1967 (age 58); Subotica, Vojvodina, Serbia
- Occupation: Novelist
- Relatives: Milivoj Prćić (father)
- Writing career
- Genres: Novels, thrillers, historical works
- Notable works: Wild Card, The Final Stroke, Come & Back

Dražen Prćić (Subotica, November 1, 1967) is a Croatian novelist from area of Bačka, autonomous province of Vojvodina, Serbia.

He's the son of Croatian writer Milivoj Prćić.

Until March 2020, he wrote fourteen novels and two historic books.

His novels are not as the mainstream of popular literature, where the violence is the dominant force (with Catholicism shown in negative context). In his works, the hero is the hardline Catholic that reaches the goal with the hard work and honest effort.

== Works ==
- Wild card, sports novel (translated in Serbian, English, Italian, German and Hungarian)
- Moja klinka i ja, youth novel (1992)
- Završni udarac, thriller (1997) (translated in English: The Final Stroke)
- Film, novel (1998)
- Tajna provincije, thriller (1999)
- Uzmi sve, action novel (2001)
- Kolos, novel (2002)

  Wild Card (2005.) (translated in English, German, Italian and Hungarian)

- D , reality novel (2007)
- Lijepe stvari, novel (2009)
- Come & back novel (2010) (translated in German and English)

Story about photography (2011) Dogovoreni brak (2013) Plemstvo Wilson (2014) (translated in Hungarian) Horvacki Bačka 1901-1939 (2015) Redefiniranje života (2017.) Subotica priča o fotografiji (2020.)
