= Finland–Serbia relations =

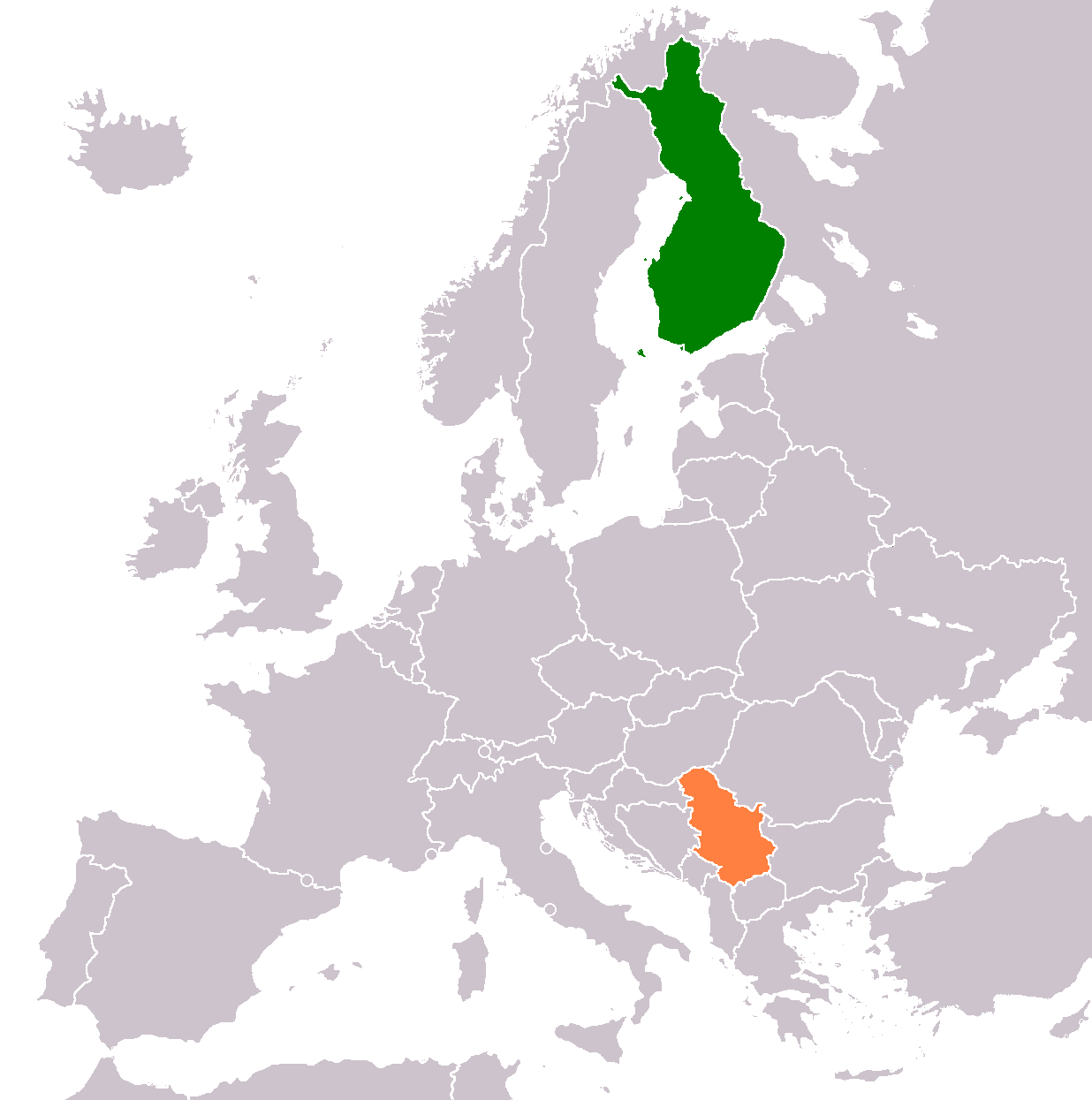
- Finland: Serbia

Finland and Serbia maintain diplomatic relations established between Finland and the Kingdom of Yugoslavia in 1929. From 1929 to 2006, Finland maintained relations with the Kingdom of Yugoslavia, the Socialist Federal Republic of Yugoslavia (SFRY), and the Federal Republic of Yugoslavia (FRY) (later Serbia and Montenegro), of which Serbia is considered shared (SFRY) or sole (FRY) legal successor.

== Economic relations ==
Trade between two countries amounted to $193 million in 2023; Serbia's merchandise export to Finland were about $61 million; Finish exports were standing at roughly $132 million.

== Resident diplomatic missions ==
- Finland has an embassy in Belgrade.
- Serbia has an embassy in Helsinki.
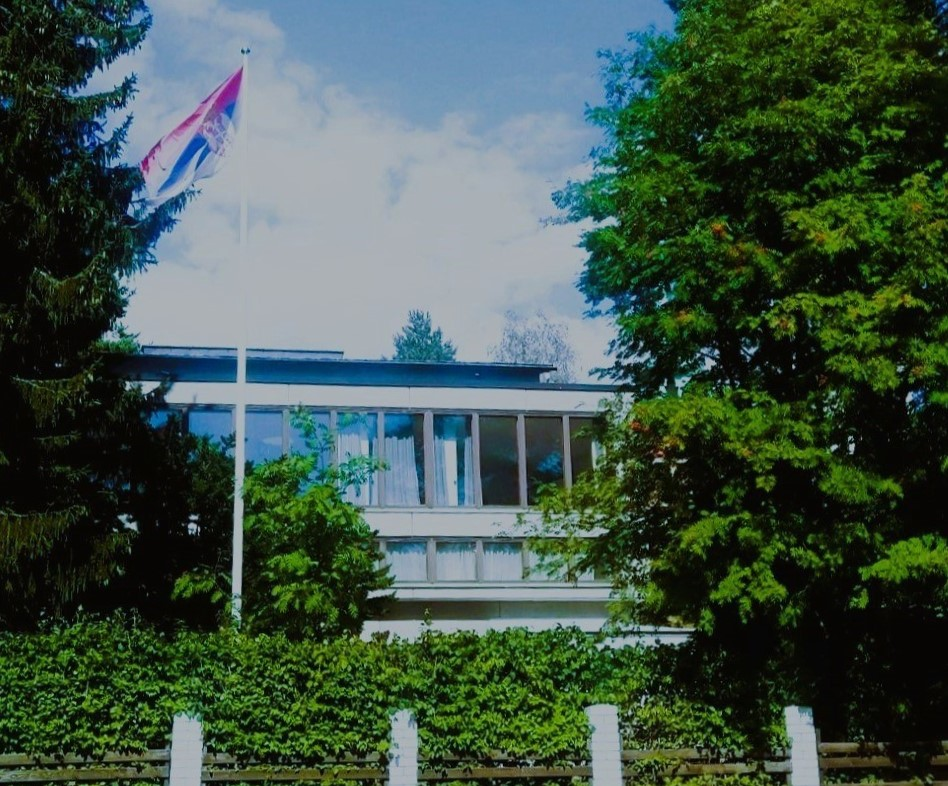
Embassy of Serbia in Helsinki

== See also ==
- Foreign relations of Finland
- Foreign relations of Serbia
- Finland–Yugoslavia relations
