= Dražen Lalić =

Croatian educator and political scientist

Dražen Lalić (born 15 June 1960, Makarska) is a Croatian educator and academic at the Faculty of Political Science of the University of Zagreb and one of the better known sociologists in the country.

== Biography ==
Lalić graduated from the Faculty of Political Sciences in 1983 and received a doctorate in sociology from the Faculty of Philosophy, Zagreb in 1993. Lalić has authored or co-authored several articles and books on various topics, including elections in Croatia, youth subcultures, non-governmental organizations.

He is sociologist of sport notable for his 1993 book titled Torcida-A look inside. It was the first book of its kind that focuses on the sociological aspects of the football supporting group Torcida Split and its members in the late 1980s and early 1990s. Lalić self-identifies as an agnostic antifascist and someone who comes from a family with Yugoslav Partisans heritage.
