= Croatia–Netherlands relations =

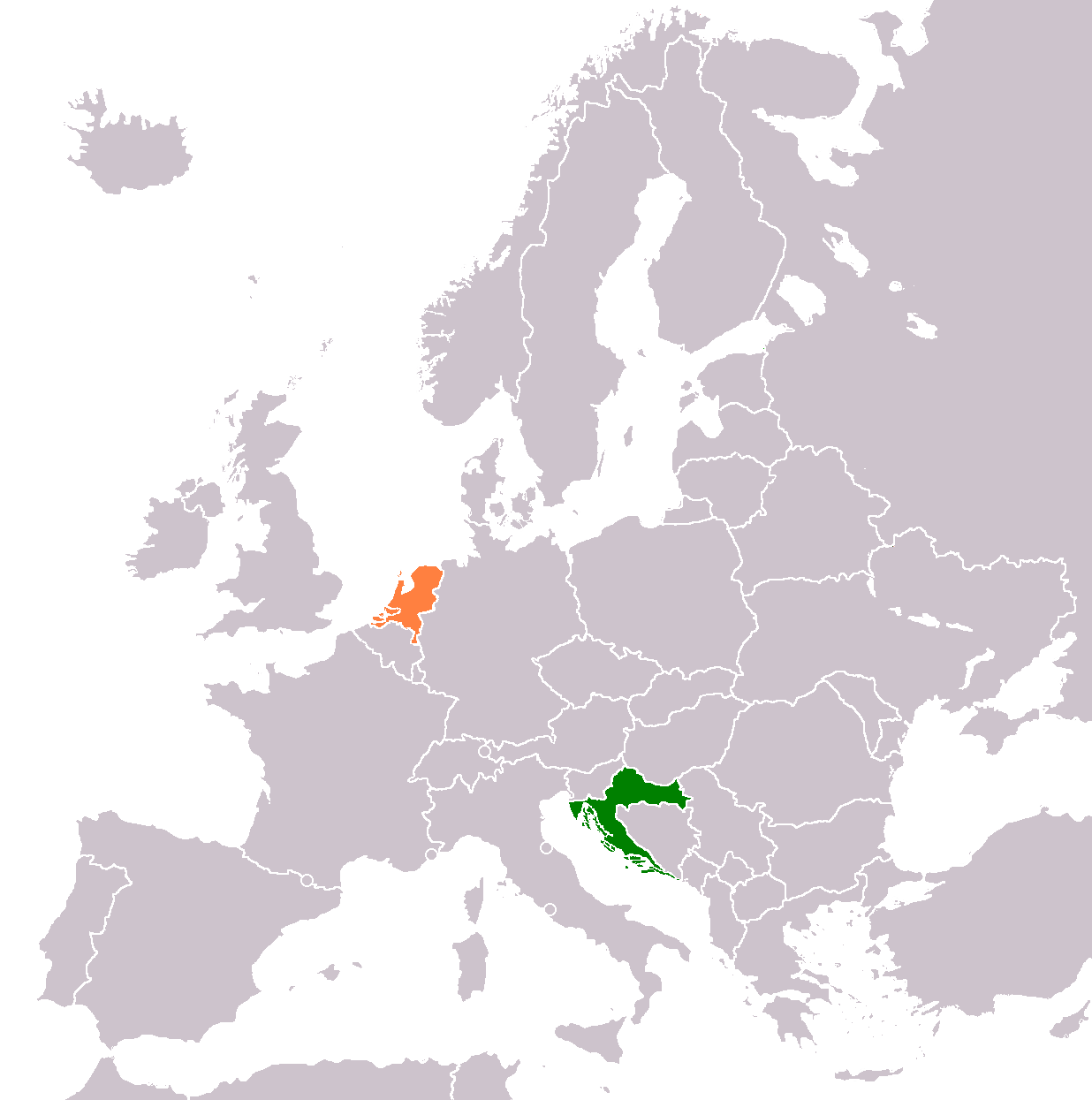

- Croatia: Netherlands

Croatia and Netherlands have maintained foreign relations since diplomatic relations were established on April 23, 1992. Croatia has an embassy in The Hague. The Netherlands have an embassy in Zagreb and 3 honorary consulates (in Dubrovnik, Opatija and Split). Both countries are full members of the Council of Europe, European Union and NATO. Netherlands joined the EU as a founding member state, and Croatia joined the EU in 2013. The Netherlands has given full support to Croatia's membership in the European Union and NATO.

== European Union and NATO ==
While the Netherlands was one of the founding members of the European Union (EU), Croatia joined the European Union (EU) in 2013. While the Netherlands was one of the founding members of NATO, Croatia joined NATO in 2009.

== Resident diplomatic missions ==
- Croatia has an embassy in The Hague.
- Netherlands has an embassy in Zagreb.
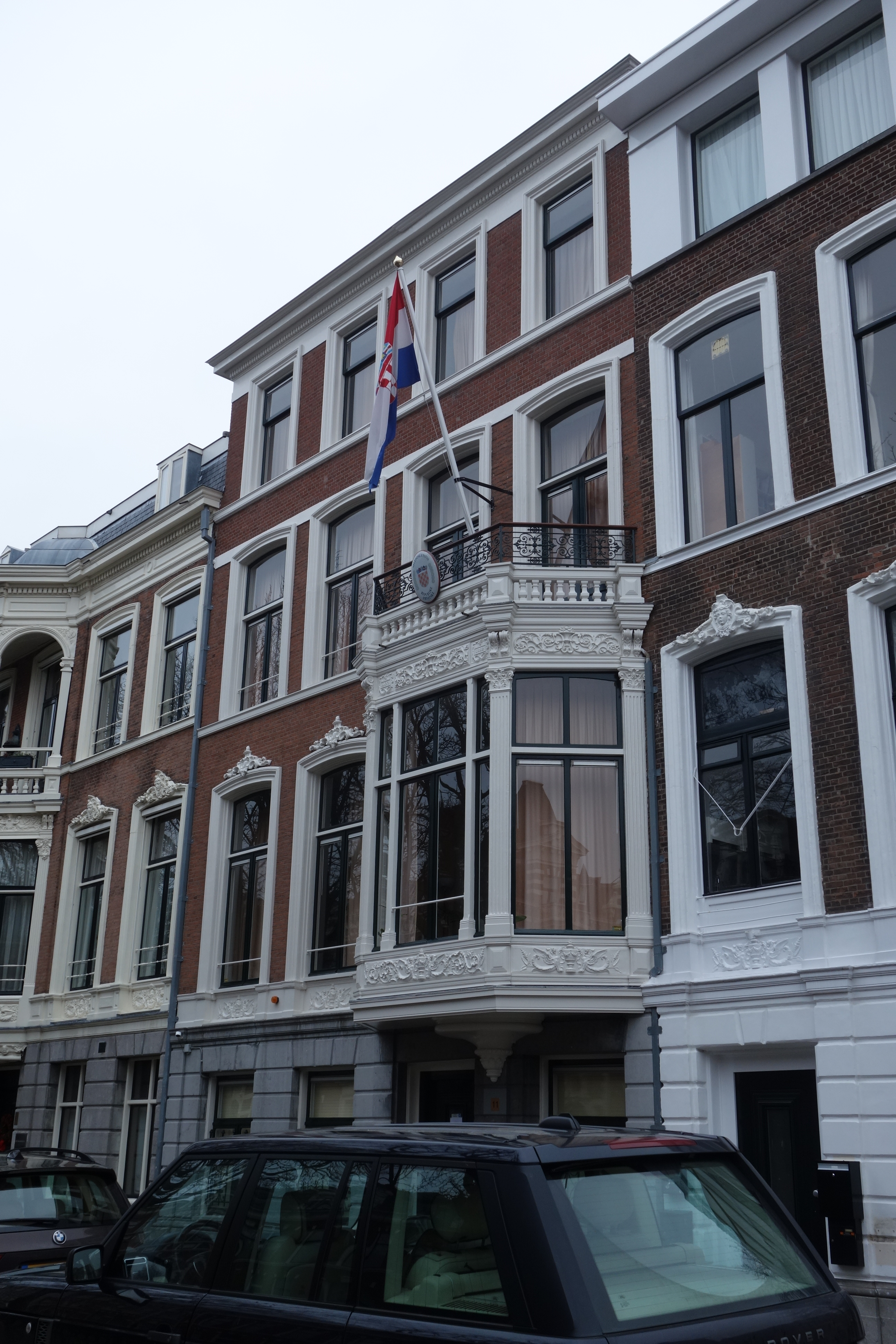
Embassy of Croatia in The Hague

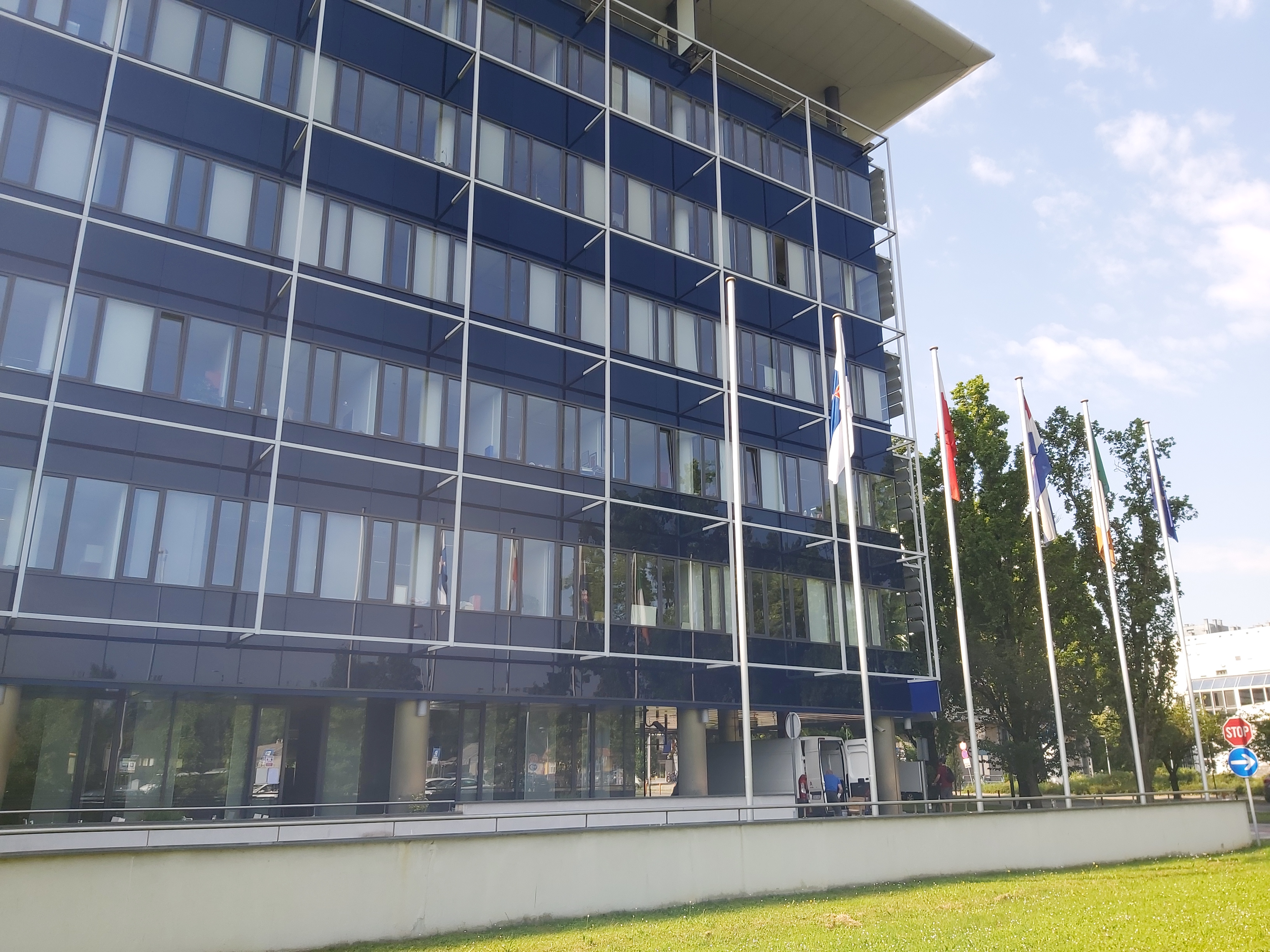
Building hosting the Embassy of the Netherlands in Zagreb

== See also ==
- Foreign relations of Croatia
- Foreign relations of the Netherlands
- Croatia in the European Union
- Netherlands–Yugoslavia relations
