= Finland–Yugoslavia relations =

Finland-Yugoslavia relations
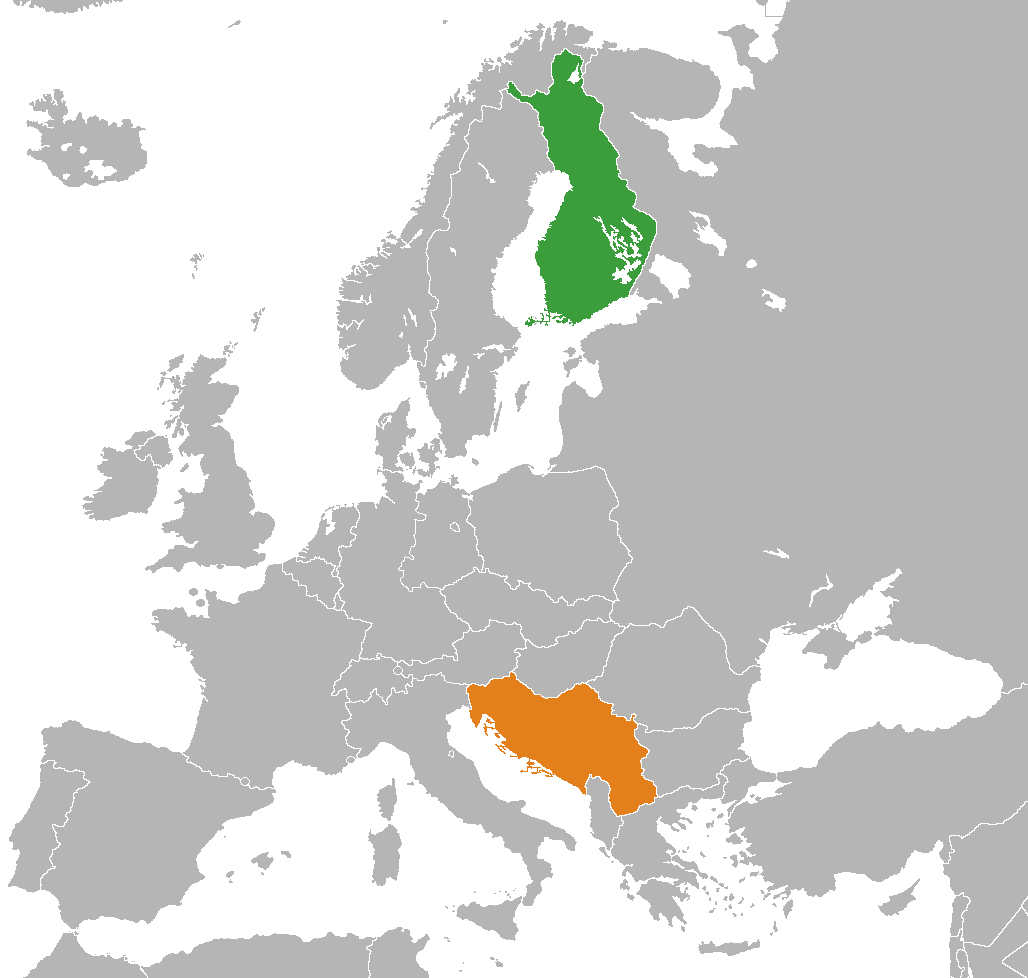

- Finland: Yugoslavia

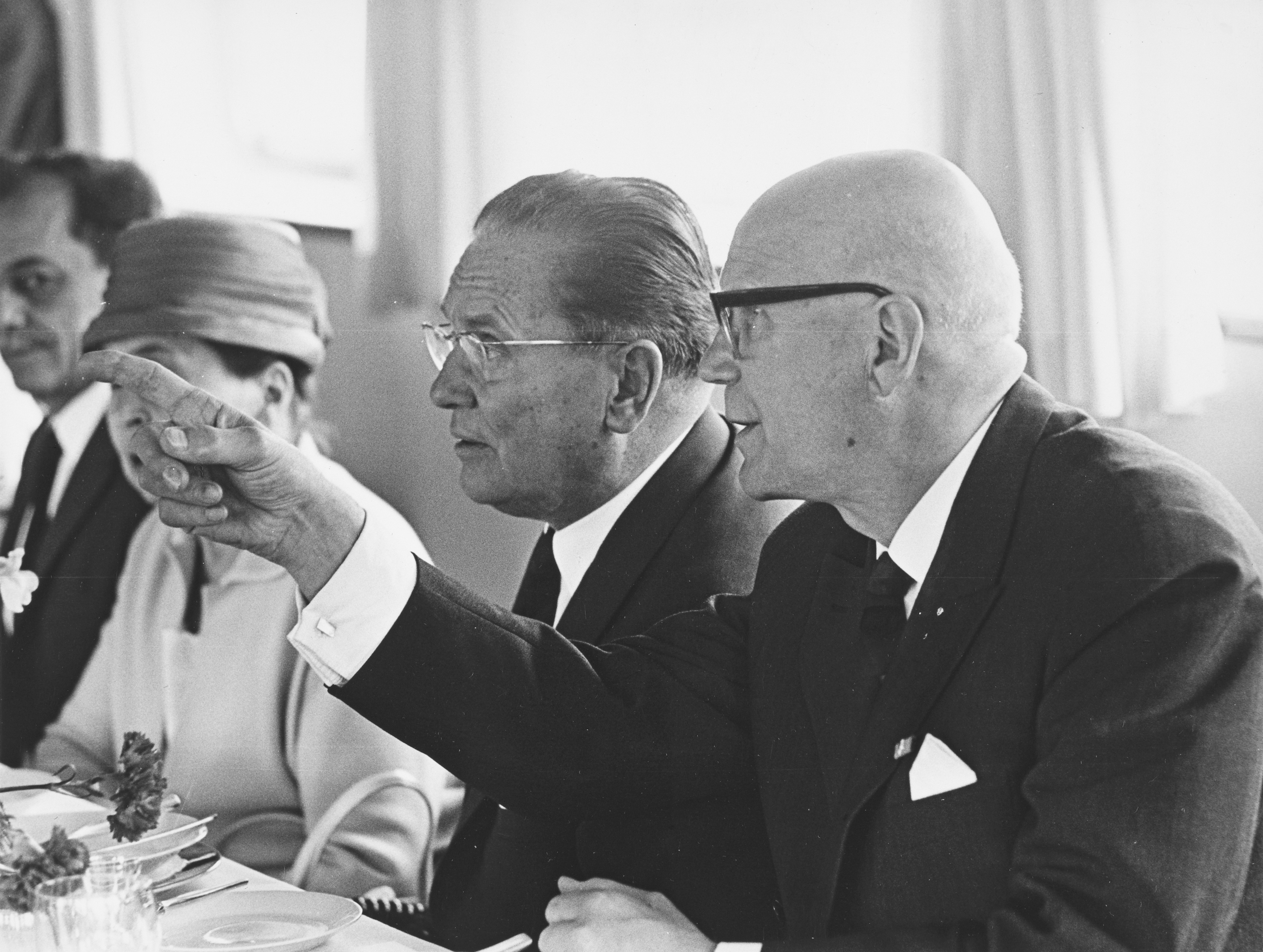
President of Yugoslavia Josip Broz Tito meeting President of Finland Urho Kekkonen

Josip Broz Tito with Urho Kekkonen

President of Yugoslavia Josip Broz Tito visits Suomenlinna in Finland with president Urho Kekkonen in 1964.

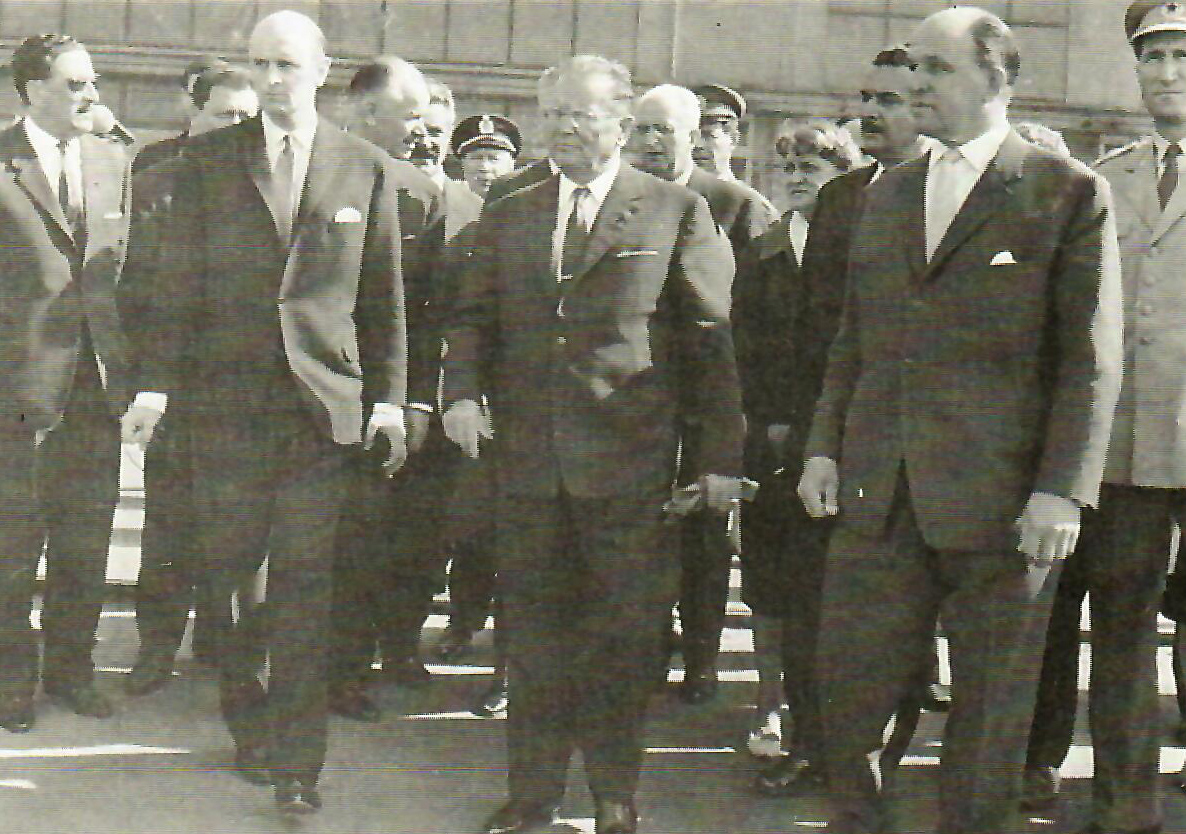
Tito at the Hietalahti shipyard

Finland–Yugoslavia relations (Finnish: Suomen ja Jugoslavian suhteet; Serbo-Croatian: Finsko-jugoslavenski odnosi, Финско-југословенски односи; Slovene: Odnosi med Finsko in Jugoslavijo; Macedonian: Односите Финска-Југославија) were historical foreign relations between Finland and the now split-up Kingdom of Yugoslavia or Socialist Federal Republic of Yugoslavia. Both countries gained their independence during or in the immediate aftermath of World War I and the collapse of Austria-Hungary (Yugoslavia) or the Russian Empire (Finland). The two parties established formal bilateral relations in 1928. The two countries developed their relations after the end of World War II and the 1948 Tito–Stalin split. At the time neither one of them was a part of either the Eastern or the Western Bloc in the Cold War–divided Europe. Both countries perceived development of relations among non-bloc neutral European states as a way to avoid isolation and preserve a certain level of independence without alienating major powers. Yugoslavia, however, perceived that in a deeply divided Europe there was shrinking maneuvering space for neutral countries and followed the development of what will be called the process of Finlandization with great concern. It therefore turned its focus on new allies among former colonies and mandate territories outside of Europe, where it developed its policy of equidistant active neutrality via its activities in the newly founded Non-Aligned Movement.

The two countries developed noticeable cultural exchange from the 1960s onward. The fact that ambitious small countries in the periphery or semi-periphery such as Yugoslavia and Finland were frequently able to use superpowers' rivalries to their own disproportional advantage motivated some scholars of the era (e.g. Tvrtko Jakovina) to focus on what they called pericentric studies of the Cold War.

Non-aligned (Yugoslavia, Cyprus and Malta) and neutral (Finland, Switzerland, Austria and to an extent Sweden) European countries continued to cooperate in an effort to overcome the Cold War divisions in Europe. This was particularly the case in their commitment to the Conference on Security and Co-operation in Europe, which preceded the modern-day Organization for Security and Co-operation in Europe. Helsinki served as the host city of the first conference, which resulted in the Helsinki Accords with the first follow-up meeting being organized in Belgrade between 4 October 1977 and 8 March 1978. During and after the Yugoslav Wars Finland continued to play a prominent role in trying to ensure peace and stability in the Yugoslav successor states. Finland cooperated in the NATO-led Stabilisation Force in Bosnia and Herzegovina and the Kosovo Force. Former President of Finland Martti Ahtisaari, as a politician from a non-NATO member country, led the Kosovo status process.

== See also ==
- Yugoslavia–European Communities relations
- Group of Nine
- Finno-Soviet Treaty of 1948
- Croatia–Finland relations
- Finland–Serbia relations
  - Views on Enlargement of NATO in Finland, Serbia, Montenegro, Croatia and Kosovo
- Death and state funeral of Josip Broz Tito
- Yugoslavia at the 1952 Summer Olympics
- Finland at the 1984 Winter Olympics
- Finland–Soviet Union relations
- Neutral and Non-Aligned European States
