= Dražen Šćuri =

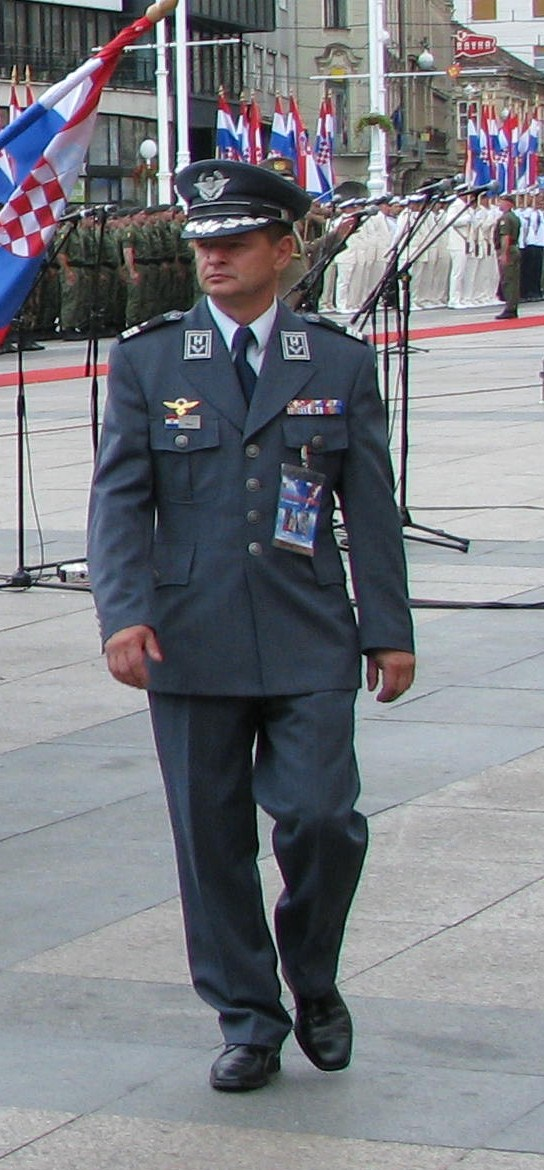
- Born: 7 January 1962; Vratišinec, Croatia
- Military career
- Allegiance: Yugoslav People's Army; Croatian Army
- Branch: SFR Yugoslav Air Force; Croatian Air Force and Air Defence
- Service years: ?-2016
- Rank: Brigadier general
- Conflicts: Croatian War of Independence

Dražen Šćuri (born 7 January 1962) was commander of the Croatian Air Force and Air Defense from 2011 to 2016.

During his career he was the commander of an attack helicopter squadron, chief of the Operational duties section of the Air Force Command, and deputy Air Force commander.
