= Dražeň =

- Municipality
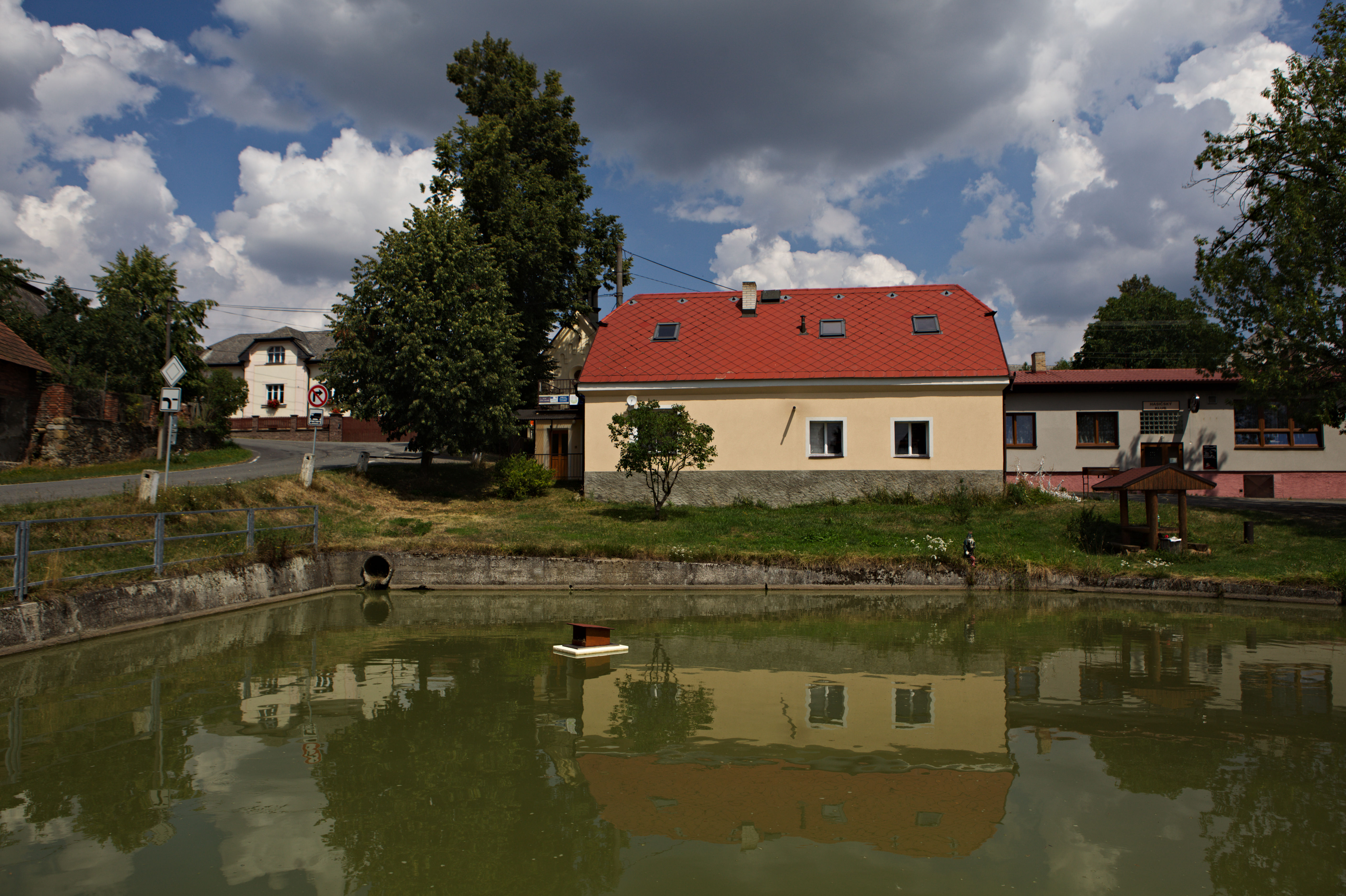
- Municipal office

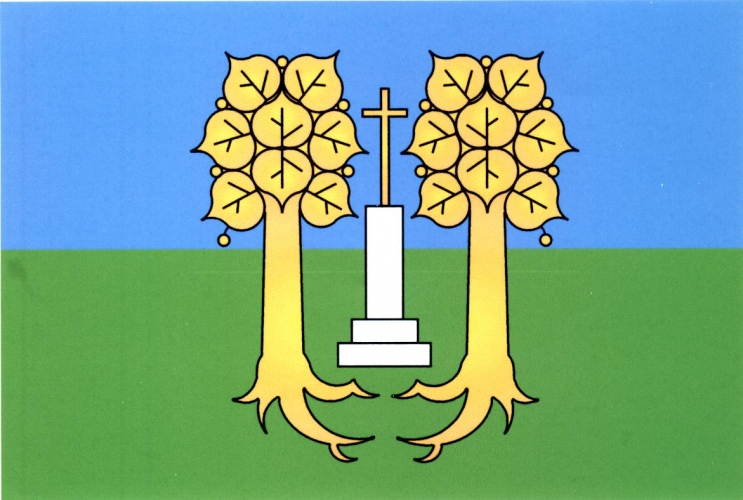
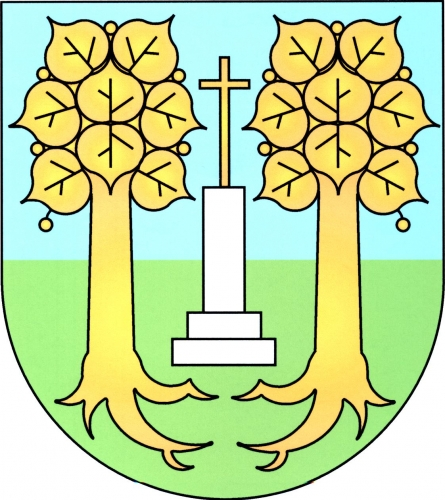
- Flag Coat of arms

- Location in the Czech Republic
- Coordinates: 49°55′37″N 13°17′17″E
- Country: Czech Republic
- Region: Plzeň
- District: Plzeň-North
- First mentioned: 1193

Area
  - Total: 8.02 km^{2} (3.10 sq mi)
- Elevation: 538 m (1,765 ft)

Population (2026-01-01)
  - Total: 179
  - Density: 22.3/km^{2} (57.8/sq mi)
- Time zone: UTC+1 (CET)
  - Summer (DST): UTC+2 (CEST)
- Postal code: 331 01
- Website: www.drazen.cz

Dražeň is a municipality and village in Plzeň-North District in the Plzeň Region of the Czech Republic. It has about 200 inhabitants.

Dražeň lies approximately 21 kilometres (13 mi) north of Plzeň and 84 km (52 mi) west of Prague.

== Demographics ==
Historical population
Year	Pop.	±%
1869	234	—
1880	272	+16.2%
1890	255	−6.2%
1900	304	+19.2%
1910	265	−12.8%
1921	271	+2.3%
1930	301	+11.1%
1950	224	−25.6%
1961	214	−4.5%
1970	175	−18.2%
1980	160	−8.6%
1991	155	−3.1%
2001	133	−14.2%
2011	150	+12.8%
2021	150	+0.0%
Source: Censuses
