= Drazan =

Drazan or Dražan is a given name or surname. Notable people bearing it include:

== Surname ==
- Anthony Drazan (born 1955), American film director and screenwriter
- Christine Drazan (born 1972), American politician
- Christopher Drazan (born 1990), Austrian footballer
- Rachael Drazan (born 1986), American ice hockey player

== Given name ==
- Dražan Jerković (1936–2008), Croatian football player and manager

== See also ==
- Dražen
