= Dragan =

- Pronunciation: Serbo-Croatian: [drǎgan] Bulgarian: [drɐˈɡan]
- Gender: Male
- Language: Serbo-Croatian, Bulgarian, Macedonian

Origin
- Origin: Slavic
- Region of origin: Southeastern Europe

Other names
- Alternative spelling: Serbian Cyrillic: Драган
- Derived: drag (precious)
- Related names: Dragana (f), Drago, Dragomir, Dragoljub, Dragutin
- See also: Dražen

Dragan (pronounced [drǎgan], Serbian Cyrillic: Драган) is a South Slavic masculine given name. It is derived from the common Slavic element drag meaning "dear, beloved". The feminine form is Dragana.

Notable people with the name include:

== A ==
- Dragan Aćimović (born 1976), Serbian politician
- Dragan Adžić (born 1969), Montenegrin handball coach
- Dragan Aleksić (1901–1958), Serbian poet, author and filmmaker
- Dragan Aleksić (basketball) (born 1970), Serbian basketball player and coach
- Dragan Aleksić (politician) (born 1963), Serbian politician
- Dragan Andrić (footballer) (born 1989), Serbian footballer
- Dragan Andrić (politician) (born 1975), Serbian politician
- Dragan Andrić (water polo) (born 1962), Serbian water polo player
- Dragan Aničić (born 1970), Serbian football player and coach
- Dragan Antanasijević (born 1987), Serbian footballer
- Dragan Apić (born 1995), Serbian basketball player
- Dragan Arsenović (1952–2004), Serbian footballer

== B ==
- Dragan Babić (1937–2013), Serbian journalist
- Dragan Bajić (born 1973), Bosnian basketball coach
- Dragan Barlov (born 1957), Serbian chess grandmaster
- Dragan Bender (born 1997), Croatian basketball player
- Dragan Bjelogrlić (born 1963), Serbian actor and director
- Dragan Blatnjak (born 1981), Bosnian football player and coach
- Dragan Bočeski (born 1963), Macedonian football player and coach
- Dragan Bogavac (born 1980), Montenegrin footballer
- Dragan Bogdanić (born 1965), Bosnian Serb politician
- Dragan Bogdanovski (1929–1998), Macedonian activist
- Dragan Boltar (1913–1988), Croatian architect
- Dragan Bošković (born 1985), Montenegrin footballer
- Dragan Bošnjak (1956–2019), Serbian footballer
- Dragan Božić (Serbian politician, born 1959), Serbian politician
- Dragan Božić (Serbian politician, born 1969), Serbian politician
- Dragan Božović (born 1961), Bosnian footballer
- Dragan Brljevic (born 1963), Croatian-Swedish handball player and coach

== C ==
- Dragan Čadikovski (born 1982), Serbian-Macedonian footballer
- Dragan Čavić (born 1958), Bosnian Serb politician
- Dragan Čedić, Serbian murderer
- Dragan Ćeran (born 1987), Serbian footballer
- Dragan Ćirić (born 1974), Serbian footballer
- Dragan Ćirjanić (born 1954), Serbian director and screenwriter
- Dragan Čolić (born 1953), Serbian politician
- Dragan Čović (born 1956), Bosnian Croat politician
- Dragan Crnogorac (politician) (born 1978), Croatian Serb politician
- Dragan Cvetković (born 1961), Serbian football player and coach

== D ==
- Dragan Damjanovic (born 1957), Swiss-Bosnian scientist
- Dragan Desančić (born 1938), Yugoslav sprint canoeist
- Dragan Despot (born 1956), Croatian actor
- Dragan Đilas (born 1967), Serbian politician and businessman
- Dragan Dimitrovski (born 1977), Macedonian footballer
- Dragan Dimić (born 1981), Serbian footballer
- Dragan Dobrić (born 1986), Serbian footballer
- Dragan Dojčin (born 1976), Serbian basketball player
- Dragan Đokanović (born 1958), Bosnian Serb politician
- Dragan Dragić (born 1980), Serbian politician
- Dragan Dragutinović (born 1980), Serbian footballer
- Dragan Drasković (born 1988), Montenegrin water polo player
- Dragan Đukanović (born 1969), Serbian football player and manager
- Dragan Đukić (born 1987), Swiss footballer
- Dragan Đukić (handballer), (born 1962), Serbian handball coach
- Dragan Durdevic (born 1976), Australian rugby league player
- Dragan Đurđević (born 1981), Serbian football player and manager
- Dragan Đurić (born 1954), Serbian businessman
- Dragan Đurović (1959–2024), Montenegrin politician
- Dragan Džajić (born 1946), Serbian footballer

== E ==
- Dragan Espenschied (born 1975), German musician

== G ==
- Dragan Gaćeša (born 1965), Serbian footballer
- Dragan Gagić (born 1935), Serbian gymnast
- Dragan Gajić (born 1984), Slovenian handball player
- Dragan Gašević, Serbian scientist and university professor
- Dragan Gaži (1930-1983), Croatian painter
- Dragan Gjorgiev (born 1990), Macedonian footballer
- Dragan Glamočić (born 1968), Serbian academic and politician
- Dragan Glogovac (born 1967), Bosnian Serb footballer
- Dragan Godžić (1927–1988), Serbian basketball player
- Dragan Gošić (born 1981), Serbian footballer
- Dragan Grivić (born 1996), Montenegrin footballer
- Dragan Gugleta (born 1941), Serbian football player and manager

== H ==
- Dragan Hajduković (born 1949), Montenegrin physicist
- Dragan Hasanagić (born 1965), Slovenian footballer
- Dragan Holcer (1945–2015), Yugoslav footballer

== I ==
- Dragan Isailović (born 1976), Serbian footballer
- Dragán Ivanov (born 1942), Hungarian athlete
- Dragan Ivanov (footballer) (born 1972), Macedonian footballer
- Dragan Ivanović (born 1969), Serbian football manager

== J ==
- Dragan Jakovljević (born 1962), Bosnian Serb footballer
- Dragan Jakovljević (basketball) (born 1973), Serbian basketball coach
- Dragan Jelić (born 1986), Slovenian footballer
- Dragan Jevtović (1960–2025), Serbian politician
- Dragan Jočić (born 1960), Serbian politician
- Dragan Joksović (1956–1998), Swedish-Montenegrin mobster
- Dragan Jovanović (actor) (born 1965), Serbian actor
- Dragan Jovanović (footballer) (1903–1936), Serbian footballer
- Dragan Jovanović (kickboxer) (born 1977), Serbian kickboxer
- Dragan Jovanović (Serbian politician, born 1946), Serbian politician
- Dragan Jovanović (Serbian politician, born 1957), Serbian politician
- Dragan Jovanović (Serbian politician, born 1960), Serbian politician
- Dragan Jovanović (Serbian politician, born 1972), Serbian politician
- Dragan Jovanović (water polo), Serbian water polo player
- Dragan Jovanović (Yugoslav politician), Yugoslav politician
- Dragan Jović (born 1963), Bosnian football coach
- Dragan Juranović (born 1994), Croatian footballer

== K ==
- Dragan Kaličanin (born 1957), Serbian footballer
- Dragan Kamberov (born 1995), Macedonian basketball player
- Dragan Kapčević (born 1985), Bosnian footballer
- Dragan Kapičić (1948–2024), Serbian basketball player
- Dragan Karanov (born 1995), Serbian footballer
- Dragan Kavaz (born 1966), Bosnian footballer
- Dragan Kesa (born 1971), Serbian-Canadian ice hockey player
- Dragan Kesich, American college football player
- Dragan Kićanović (born 1963), Serbian basketball player
- Dragan Kobiljski (born 1971), Serbian volleyball player and coach
- Dragan Kojadinović (born 1954), Serbian journalist and politician
- Dragan Kojić Keba (born 1956), Serbian folk singer
- Dragan Kokanović (born 2002), Serbian footballer
- Dragan Kokotović (born 1953), Serbian football player and manager
- Dragan Kovačić (1939–1999), Croatian basketball player
- Dragan Krapović (born 1976), Montenegrin economist and politician
- Dragan Kresoja (1946–1996), Serbian film director
- Dragan Kruscić (born 1986) Serbian basketball player
- Dragan Kujović (1948–2010), Montenegrin politician

== L ==
- Dragan Labović (1987–2025), Serbian basketball player
- Dragan Lacmanović (born 1954), Serbian football player and manager
- Dragan Lazarević (born 1964), known as Dragan de Lazare, Serbian cartoonist, comic book artist and illustrator
- Dragan Lepinjica (born 1961), Serbian footballer
- Dragan Ljubisavljević (born 1979), Serbian footballer
- Dragan Lovrić (born 1996), Croatian footballer
- Dragan Lukač (born 1968), Bosnian Serb politician
- Dragan Lukić (1928–2006), Serbian writer
- Dragan Lukić Lvky (born 1970), Croatian singer and songwriter
- Dragan Lukovski (born 1975), Serbian basketball player

== M ==
- Dragan Maksimović (1949–2001), Serbian actor
- Dragan Maksimović (academic), Serbian-American academic and university professor
- Dragan Malesevic Tapi (1949–2002), Serbian painter
- Dragan Mance (1962–1985), Serbian footballer
- Dragan Marinković (born 1968), Bosnian Serb actor and TV personality
- Dragan Marjanac (born 1985), Serbian handball player
- Dragan Marjanović (born 1954), Bosnian footballer
- Dragan Markovina (born 1981), Croatian historian and politician
- Dragan Marković (handballer) (born 1969), German-Bosnian handball player and coach
- Dragan Marković (politician) (1960–2024), Serbian politician
- Dragan Marković Markoni (born 1965), Serbian politician
- Dragan Marušič (born 1953), Slovenian mathematician
- Dragan Maršićanin (born 1950), Serbian economist and politician
- Dragan Mektić (born 1956), Bosnian Serb politician
- Dragan D. Mihailović (born 1958), Slovenian physicist and research scientist
- Dragan Mihajlović (born 1991), Swiss footballer
- Dragan Mikerević (born 1955), Bosnian Serb politician
- Dragan Milenković (born 1984), Macedonian basketball player
- Dragan Miletović (born 1956), Serbian footballer
- Dragan Milić (born 1965), Serbian cardiac surgeon and university professor
- Dragan Milivojević (1938–1993), Croatian actor
- Dragan Milosavljević (born 1989), Serbian basketball player
- Dragan Milošević (born 1954), Serbian medical doctor and politician
- Dragan Milovanović (footballer) (born 1986), Serbian footballer
- Dragan Milovanović (politician, born 1953), Serbian politician
- Dragan Milovanović (politician, born 1955), Serbian politician
- Dragan Miranović (1956–2012), Serbian-Montenegrin football player and manager
- Dragan Mićanović (born 1970), Serbian actor
- Dragan Mićić (born 1969), Bosnian-Serbian football player and manager
- Dragan Mladenović (footballer) (born 1976), Serbian footballer
- Dragan Mladenović (handballer, born 1956), Serbian handball player
- Dragan Momić (born 1963), Serbian handball player
- Dragan Mrđa (born 1984), Serbian footballer
- Dragan Mustapić (born 1963), Croatian discus thrower
- Dragan Mutibarić (born 1946), Serbian footballer

== N ==
- Dragan Načevski (born 1980), Macedonian footballer
- Dragan Nešić (born 1954), Serbian artist
- Dragan Nikolić (basketball) (born 1972), Serbian basketball coach
- Dragan Nikolić (politician) (born 1960), Serbian politician
- Dragan Nikolić (Serbian commander) (1957–2018), Serbian military officer
- Dragan Nikolić (1943–2016), Serbian actor

== O ==
- Dragan Obradović (born 1957), Yugoslav rower
- Dragan Obrenović (born 1963), former Bosnian Serb military commander
- Dragan Okuka (born 1954), Serbian football player and manager

== P ==
- Dragan Paljić (born 1983), German-Serbian footballer
- Dragan Pantelić (1951–2021), Serbian footballer
- Dragan Papazoglu (fl. 1804–1807), Bulgarian mercenary
- Dragan Paskaš (born 1951), Serbian general
- Dragan Pavlović Latas (born 1960), Macedonian-Serbian journalist
- Dragan Pechmalbec (born 1996), French-Serbian handball player
- Dragan Perić (born 1964), Serbian shot putter
- Dragan Perišić (born 1979), Serbian football player and manager
- Dragan Petričević (born 1969), Bosnian-Romanian basketball coach
- Dragan Petrović (born 1961), Serbian actor
- Dragan Plamenac (1895–1983), Croatian composer and musicologist
- Dragan Popadić (born 1946), Serbian football player and manager
- Dragan Popović (born 1941), Yugoslav football player and coach
- Dragan Primorac (born 1965), Croatian scientist and politician
- Dragan Prokopiev, Bulgarian choir conductor and music pedagogue
- Dragan Punišić (born 1966), Serbian footballer

== R ==
- Dragan Raca (born 1961), Serbian basketball coach
- Dragan Radenović (born 1951), Serbian artist and university professor
- Dragan Radojičić (born 1970), Montenegrin football player and manager
- Dragan Radosavljević (born 1982), Serbian footballer
- Dragan Radović (born 1976), Montenegrin footballer
- Dragan Radović (basketball) (born 1976), Montenegrin basketball player and coach
- Dragan Radulović (born 1969), Montenegrin writer and literary critic
- Dragan Radovich (born 1956), Croatian-American footballer
- Dragan Reljić (born 1968), Croatian footballer
- Dragan Ristić (born 1978), Serbian sports shooter
- Dragan Roganović (born 1978), known as Dirty South, Serbian-Australian music producer and DJ
- Dragan Rosić (born 1996), Serbian footballer

== S ==
- Dragan Sakan (1950–2013), Serbian psychologist
- Dragan Šakota (born 1952), Serbian-Greek basketball coach
- Dragan Šarac (born 1975), Serbian football player and manager
- Dragan Savić, Serbian tennis player
- Dragan Savkić (born 1947), Serbian politician
- Dragan Simeunović (born 1954), Yugoslav footballer
- Dragan Skočić (born 1968), Croatian football player and coach
- Dragan Škrba (born 1962), Bosnian footballer
- Dragan Škrbić (born 1968), Serbian handball player
- Dragan Slišković (1942–2009), Yugoslav footballer
- Dragan Smiljanić (born 1970), Serbian basketball player
- Dragan Šoć (born 1957), Montenegrin lawyer and politician
- Dragan Šolak (businessman) (born 1964), Serbian businessman
- Dragan Šolak (chess player) (born 1980), Serbian-Turkish chess grandmaster
- Dragan Šormaz (born 1967), Serbian politician
- Dragan Sotirović (1913–1987), Serbian army commander
- Dragan Stančić (born 1982), Serbian footballer
- Dragan Stanković (born 1985), Serbian volleyball player
- Dragan Stanojević (born 1971), Serbian politician and businessman
- Dragan Starčević (born 1977), Serbian retired footballer
- Dragan Stevanović (born 1971), Serbian football player and manager
- Dragan Stoisavljević (born 2003), Serbian footballer
- Dragan Stojisavljević (born 1974), Serbian footballer
- Dragan Stojkić (born 1975), Bosnian footballer
- Dragan Stojković (born 1965), Serbian football player and manager
- Dragan Stojkov (born 1988), Macedonian footballer
- Dragan Sudžum (born 1978), Serbian handball player and coach
- Dragan Šutanovac (born 1968), Serbian politician

== T ==
- Dragan Tadić (born 1973), Croatian football player and coach
- Dragan Tadić (Serbian footballer) (born 1977)
- Dragan Talajić (born 1965), Croatian football player and manager
- Dragan Tarlać (born 1973), Serbian basketball player
- Dragan Tešanović (born 1985), Serbian mixed martial arts fighter
- Dragan Todorić (born 1954), Serbian basketball player
- Dragan Todorović (politician) (born 1953), Serbian politician
- Dragan Todorović (writer) (born 1958), Yugoslav writer, journalist, and artist
- Dragan Tomić (Serbian politician, born 1935), acting President of Serbia in 1997
- Dragan Tomić (Serbian politician, born 1946), two-term mayor of Vranje
- Dragan Tomić (Serbian politician, born 1958), two-term parliamentarian
- Dragan Tomić (IT engineer), Serbian computer engineer
- Dragomir Dragan Tomić, Serbian entrepreneur and politician
- Dragan Trajković (born 1986), Serbian footballer
- Dragan Travica (born 1986), Croatian-Italian volleyball player
- Dragan Trkulja (born 1964), Serbian footballer
- Dragan Tsankov (1828–1911), Bulgarian politician, twice Prime Minister
- Dragan Tubak (born 1987), Serbian-Bosnian basketball player

== U ==
- Dragan Umičević (born 1984), Swedish ice hockey player
- Dragan Uskoković (born 1950), Serbian-Montenegrin playwright and journalist

== V ==
- Dragan Vaščanin (born 1971), Serbian basketball coach
- Dragan Vasiljević (born 1971), Serbian footballer
- Dragan Vasiljković (born 1954), Serbian paramilitary officer
- Dragan Velikić (born 1953), Serbian novelist and diplomat
- Dragan Velić (born 1958), Kosovo Serb politician
- Dragan Veljković (born 1964), Serbian politician
- Dragan Veselinovski (born 1968), Macedonian retired footballer
- Dragan Veselinov (born 1950), Serbian politician and university professor
- Dragan Vesović (born 1966), Serbian politician
- Dragan Vikić (8 October 1955), Bosnian military officer
- Dragan Vučić (1955–2020), Macedonian composer, singer and TV host
- Dragan Vučićević (born 1973), Serbian journalist
- Dragan Vujadinović (1953–2021), Serbian politician, economist and journalist
- Dragan Vujanović (born 1946), Bosnian footballer
- Dragan Vujković (born 1953), Yugoslav boxer
- Dragan Vujović (born 1953), Montenegrin footballer
- Dragan Vukmir (born 1978), Serbian football player and manager
- Dragan Vukoja (born 1969), Croatian footballer
- Dragan Vuković (born 1963), Serbian basketball coach
- Dragan Vulević (born 1970), Serbian footballer
- Dragan Vulin (born 1986), Croatian politician and scientist

== Z ==
- Dragan Žarković (born 1986), Serbian footballer
- Dragan Zdravković (born 1959), Serbian middle-distance runner
- Dragan Zeković (born 1987), Serbian-Montenegrin basketball player
- Dragan Žilić (born 1974), Serbian footballer
- Dragan Živkov (born 1958), Serbian politician
- Dragan Zorić (born 1979), Serbian sprint canoer
- Dragan Župan (born 1982), Croatian footballer
