= Dragana (given name) =

- Pronunciation: Serbo-Croatian: [drǎɡana]
- Gender: female
- Language: Serbo-Croatian, Bulgarian, Macedonian

Origin
- Origin: Slavic
- Meaning: Precious
- Region of origin: Southeastern Europe

Other names
- Alternative spelling: Cyrillic: Драгана
- Nicknames: Draga (Драга), Gana (Гана), Gaga (Гага)
- Related names: male form Dragan, Drago
- See also: Draga, Dragica

Dragana (Cyrillic: Драгана) is a Slavic feminine given name. It is the feminine form of the male name Dragan, which is derived from the common Slavic element drag meaning "dear, beloved, precious".

== Notable people with the name ==
- Dragana Atlija (born 1986), Serbian actress and model
- Dragana Barišić (born 1975), Serbian politician
- Dragana Branković Minčić (born 1970), Serbian politician
- Dragana Cvijić (born 1990), Serbian handball player
- Dragana Đorđević (born in 1960), Serbian painter
- Dragana Đorđević (gymnast) (1914–?), Yugoslav gymnast
- Dragana Gegova (born 2000), Macedonian footballer
- Dragana Gladović (born 1992), Serbian taekwondo practitioner
- Dragana Ilić (born 1979), Serbian tennis player
- Dragana Jugović del Monaco, Serbian mezzo-soprano
- Dragana Kosjerina (born 1987), Serbian journalist
- Dragana Kostić (born 1971), Serbian politician
- Dragana Kostova (born 1991), Macedonian footballer
- Dragana Kovačević (born 1981), Serbian cyclist
- Dragana Kršenković Brković (born c. 1950), Montenegrin writer
- Dragana Lazarević (fl. 1371–1395), Serbian princess, Empress consort of Bulgaria
- Dragana Lukić (born 1988), Serbian politician
- Dragana Marinković (born 1982), Croatian-Serbian volleyball player
- Dragana Miljanić (born 1978), Serbian politician
- Dragana Milošević (born 1983), Serbian politician
- Dragana Mirković (born 1968), Serbian singer
- Dragana Pecevska (born 1983), Macedonian handball player
- Dragana Petkovska (born 1996), Macedonian handball player
- Dragana Pešić (born 1963), Yugoslav handball player
- Dragana Popović, Serbian-American physicist
- Dragana Potpara (born 1977), Serbian politician
- Dragana Radinović (born 1976), Serbian politician
- Dragana Rakić (born 1973), Serbian politician
- Dragana Lucija Ratković Aydemir (born 1969), Croatian art historian
- Dragana Rogulja, Serbian neuroscientist
- Dragana Šarić (born 1962), Serbian singer known as "Bebi Dol"
- Dragana Stanković (born 1995), Serbian basketball player
- Dragana Todorović (born 1974), Serbian singer known as "Jana"
- Dragana Tomašević (born 1982), Serbian discus thrower
- Dragana Tripković (born 1984), Montenegrin poet, playwright and journalist
- Dragana Zarić (born 1977), Serbian tennis player

== See also ==
- Dragana, Bulgaria, village in Bulgaria
- Dragan
