= Dragoslav =

Slavic masculine given name

- Pronunciation: Serbo-Croatian: [drâɡoslaʋ]
- Gender: Male
- Language: South Slavic

Origin
- Origin: drag ("dear, beloved") and slava ("glory, fame")
- Region of origin: Eastern Europe

Other names
- Alternative spelling: Cyrillic: Драгослав
- Variant forms: Dragislav, Dragoslava (f)
- See also: Drago

Dragoslav (Cyrillic: Драгослав) is a South Slavic masculine given name. The name is composed of the Slavic elements drag ("dear, beloved") and slava ("glory, fame"), both common in Slavic dithematic names.

Notable people with the name include:

- Dragoslav Pavle Aksentijević (born 1942), Serbian painter and singer
- Dragoslav Avramović (1919–2001), Serbian economist
- Dragoslav Bokan (born 1961), Serbian film director and writer
- Dragoslav Čakić (born 1965), Croatian footballer
- Dragoslav Ćirković (born 1954), Serbian politician
- Dragoslav Jakovljević (1932–2012), Serbian boxer
- Dragoslav Jevrić (born 1974), Serbian footballer
- Dragoslav Jovanović (born 1937), Serbian politician
- Dragoslav Jovanović (born 1951), Serbian politician
- Dragoslav Marković (1920–2005), Serbian politician
- Dragoslav Mihailović (1930–2023), Serbian writer
- Dragoslav Mihajlović (1906–1978), Yugoslav footballer
- Dragoslav Miljković (1883–1953), Yugoslav army general
- Dragoslav Mitrinović (1908–1995), Serbian mathematician
- Dragoslav Ognjanović (1961–2018), Serbian lawyer
- Dragoslav Papić (born 1987), Serbian basketball player
- Dragoslav Pejić (1929–2016), Yugoslav diplomat
- Dragoslav Poleksić (born 1970), Montenegrin footballer
- Dragoslav Račić (1905–1945), Serbian military commander
- Dragoslav Ražnatović (born 1941), Serbian basketball player
- Dragoslav Šekularac (1937–2019), Serbian footballer
- Dragoslav D. Šiljak (born 1933), Serbian-American academic and university professor
- Dragoslav Srejović (1931–1996), Serbian archaeologist
- Dragoslav Stepanović (born 1948), Serbian football player and coach

== See also ==
- I. Dragoslav (1875–1928), Romanian writer
- Jovan Dragoslav (fl. 1300–15), Serbian nobleman
- Drago (given name)
- Dragoljub
- Dragomir
- Slavic names
