= Dragan Jovanović =

Dragan Jovanović may refer to:

- Dragan Jovanović (actor) (born 1965), Serbian actor
- Dragan Jovanović (footballer) (1903–1936), Serbian footballer
- Dragan Jovanović (water polo), Serbian water polo goalkeeper and coach
- Dragan Jovanović (kickboxer) (born 1977), Serbian kickboxer
- Dragan Jovanović (Serbian politician, born 1946), Serbian politician
- Dragan Jovanović (Serbian politician, born 1957), Serbian politician
- Dragan Jovanović (Serbian politician, born 1960), Serbian politician
- Dragan Jovanović (Serbian politician, born 1972), Serbian politician
- Dragan Jovanović (Yugoslav politician), Serbian politician and finance minister of Yugoslavia
