= Draža =

Draža (Cyrillic: Дража) is a South Slavic diminutive for given names with the stem drag- ("dear, beloved"): Dragoljub, Predrag, Dragan, etc. Notable people with the name include:

- Dragan Sotirović, alias Draża (1913–1987), Serbian chetnik, captain of the Yugoslav Army, and major of the Polish Home Army
- Dragoljub "Draža" Pavlović (Knjaževac, 16 June 1867 - Belgrade, 3 April 1920) was a Serbian politician, historian
- Dragoslav "Draža" Marković 1920–2005), Serbian communist politician
- Draža Mihailović (1893–1946), Yugoslavian ethnic-Serbian general

== See also ==
- Draža Mihailović Cup, a basketball tournament in Australia
