= Draga (given name) =

- Pronunciation: Serbo-Croatian: [drǎːɡa]
- Gender: Female

Origin
- Origin: South Slavic

Other names
- Alternative spelling: Cyrillic: Драга
- Related names: male form Drago
- See also: Dragana, Dragica

Draga (Cyrillic: Драга) is a South Slavic feminine given name. It is derived from the common Slavic element drag meaning "dear, beloved". It is the female form of Drago.

== Notable people with the name ==
- Draga Ahačič (1924—2023), Slovenian actress and film director
- Draga Dejanović (1840–1871), Serbian poet
- Draga Garašanin (1921–1997), Serbian archaeologist
- Draga Gavrilović (1854–1917), Serbian writer, pedagogue and translator
- Draga Gregorič Rosenberg (1879–1965), Slovenian educator
- Draga Ljočić (1855–1926), Serbian physician and feminist
- Draga Matković (1907–2013), German-Croatian classical pianist
- Draga Obrenović (1866–1903), Queen of Serbia
- Draga Stamejčič (1937–2015), Slovenian athlete

== See also ==
- Proper names derived from Drag-
