= Dragoslav Jovanović =

Dragoslav Jovanović may refer to:

- Dragoslav Jovanović (academic) (1886–1939), a founding member of the Serbian Cultural Club
- Dragoslav Jovanović (Serbian politician, born 1937), Deputy Prime Minister of Serbia from 1993 to 1994
- Dragoslav Jovanović (Serbian politician, born 1951), parliamentarian from 2004 to 2006
- Dragoslav Jovanović (rower), Yugoslav competitor in rowing at the 1979 Mediterranean Games
