= Barišić =

Barišić is a Croatian surname. According to 2011 census results, it is one of 10 most frequent surnames in Brod-Posavina and Šibenik-Knin County of Croatia. People with the surname include:

- Adrian Leon Barišić (born 2001), Bosnian footballer
- Andrew Barisic (born 1986), Australian footballer
- Bartol Barišić (born 2003), Croatian footballer
- Borna Barišić (born 1992), Croatian football player
- Dragana Barišić (born 1975), Serbian politician
- Hrvoje Barišić (born 1991), Croatian footballer
- Marko Barišić (born 1993), Croatian football player
- Josip Barišić (footballer born 1981), Croatian football player
- Josip Barišić (footballer born 1983), Bosnian Croat football player
- Josip Barišić (born 1986), Croatian footballer
- Maks Barišič (born 1995), Slovenian footballer
- Marin Barišić (born 1947), Croatian archbishop
- Mirko Barišić (born 1936), Croatian sportsman, businessman and entrepreneur
- Pavo Barišić (born 1959), Croatian philosopher and politician
- Rafael Barišić (1796–1863), Croatian Catholic bishop
- Teo Barišić (born 2004), French-Croatian footballer
- Tina Barišić (born 2000), Croatian handball player
- Tomislav Barišić (born 1993), Bosnian footballer
- Valentin Barišić (born 1966), Croatian football manager
- Zoran Barisic (born 1970), Austrian football player and manager
