= Ljubodrag (given name) =

Slavic masculine given name

- Gender: masculine

Origin
- Language: Slavic
- Origin: ljub ("love") and drag ("dear, precious")
- Region of origin: Eastern Europe

Other names
- Alternative spelling: Љубодраг
- Related names: Dragoljub, Ljubomir

Ljubodrag (Cyrillic: Љубодраг) is a Serbian masculine given name. It is composed from the Slavic elements ljub ("love, to like") and -drag ("dear, beloved"), both common in Slavic dithematic names.

Notable people with the name include:

- Ljubodrag Simonović (born 1949), Serbian philosopher, author and basketball player
- Ljubodrag Dimić (born 1956), Serbian historian and university professor
- Ljubodrag Milošević (born 1969), Macedonian footballer
- Ljubodrag Miščević (born 1960), Serbian politician

== See also ==
- Ljubodrag, village in Macedonia
- Dragoljub
- Slavic names
