= Dragica =

- Pronunciation: Serbo-Croatian: [dráːɡit͡sa]
- Gender: Female

Origin
- Origin: South Slavic

Other names
- Alternative spelling: Cyrillic: Драгица
- Nickname: Draga (Драга)
- Related names: Draga, Dragana

Dragica (Cyrillic: Драгица) is a South Slavic feminine given name. It is derived from the common Slavic element drag meaning "dear, beloved", combined with the diminutive suffix -ica.

== Notable people with the name ==
- Dragica Basletić (1916—1976), Croatian gymnast
- Dragica Cepernić (born 1981), Croatian football player
- Dragica Džono (born 1987), Croatian handball player
- Dragica Đurić (born 1963), former Yugoslav handball player
- Dragica Kresoja (born 1986), Macedonian handball player
- Dragica Mitrova (born 1987), Macedonian handball player
- Dragica Ponorac, Montenegrin diplomat
- Dragica Sekulić (born 1980), Montenegrin politician
- Dragica Vasileska, Macedonian scientist
