= Gana (nickname) =

Gana (Cyrillic: Гана) is a nickname, often a diminutive form (hypocorism) of Dragana. The nickname may also refer to:

- Gana Bala, an Indian playback singer
- Gana (outlaw), Nigerian criminal
