= Dragan Damjanovic =

Swiss-Bosnian-Herzegovinian materials scientist

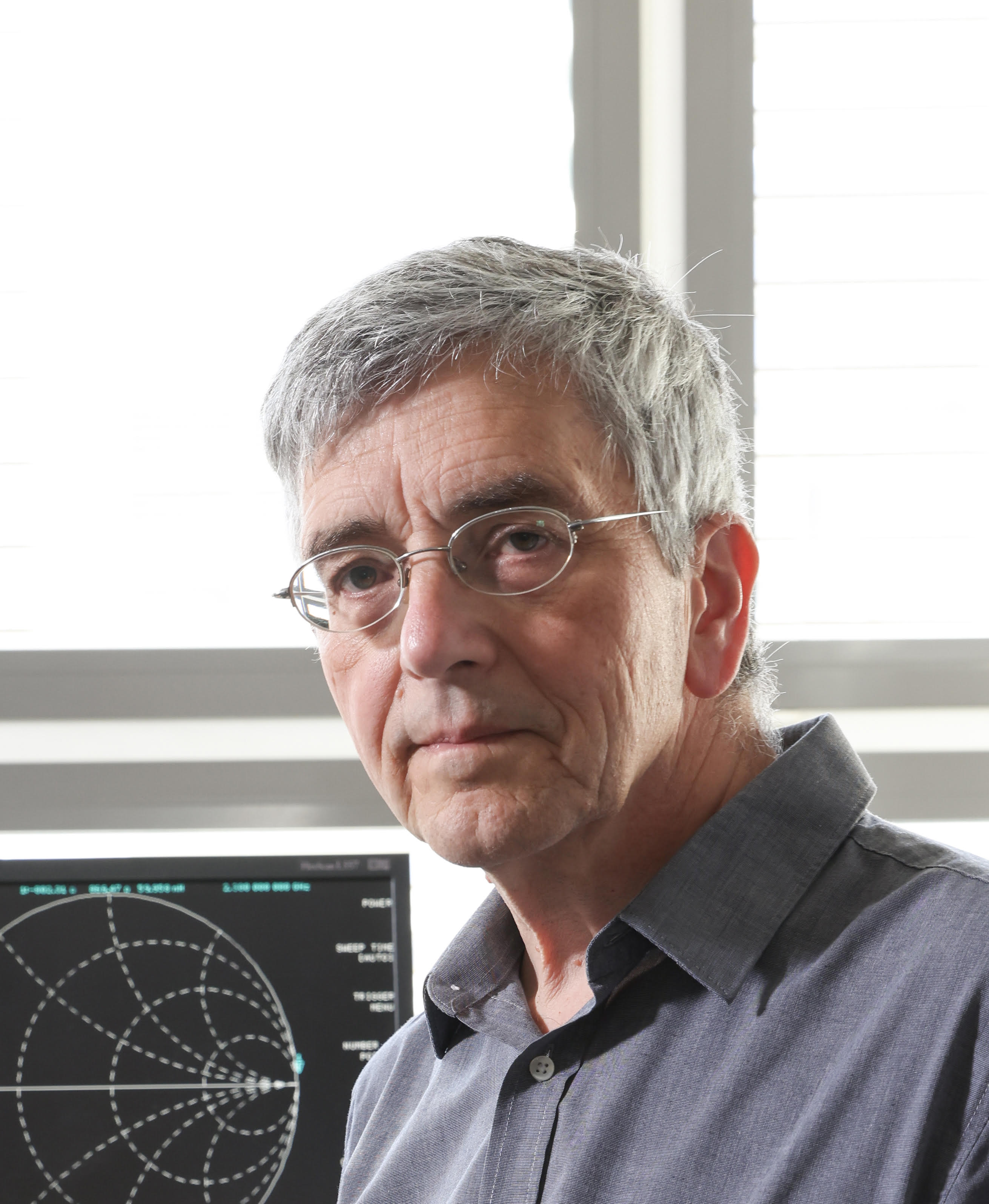
- Dragan Damjanovic in 2021
- Born: 1957 (age 68–69); Sarajevo, Bosnia and Hercegovina,Yugoslavia
- Citizenship: Switzerland, Bosnia and Hercegovina
- Education: University of Sarajevo (B.S.); Pennsylvania State University (Ph.D.)
- Known for: Piezoelectric, ferroelectric and dielectric materials
- Scientific career
- Workplaces: EPFL (École Polytechnique Fédérale de Lausanne)
- Thesis: Highly anisotropic electromechanical properties in modified lead titanate ceramics (1987)
- Doctoral advisor: L. Eric Cross
- Website: people.epfl.ch/dragan.damjanovic

Dragan Damjanovic (born 1957 in Sarajevo, Bosnia and Hercegovina, Yugoslavia) is a Swiss-Bosnian-Herzegovinian materials scientist. From 2008 to 2022, he was a professor of materials science at EPFL (École Polytechnique Fédérale de Lausanne) and head of the Group for Ferroelectrics and Functional Oxides.

== Career ==
Damjanovic received a bachelor's degree (summa cum laude) in physics from the University of Sarajevo in 1980. He then joined L. Eric Cross at Pennsylvania State University for a Ph.D. In 1987, he graduated with a thesis in ceramics science titled: "Highly anisotropic electromechanical properties in modified lead titanate ceramics." The Philips Fellowship funded his research. He continued as a research associate at Pennsylvania State University's Materials Research Laboratory. During that time he mainly worked on the pyroelectric properties of synthetic polypeptides, piezoelectric composites for underwater applications, and thermo-optical imagers. In 1991, he joined EPFL's Ceramics Laboratory at the Institute of Materials. Until 2022, he led the Group on Ferroelectrics and Functional Oxides as a professor at EPFL. He taught undergraduate and graduate courses on structure, defects, and electrical properties of materials

== Research ==
Damjanovic investigates physical electro-mechanical processes at different driving fields over a wide range of spatial (atomic to macroscopic device size) and time (mHz to GHz) scales. He also studied how those processes affect the macroscopic behavior of ceramics, polymers, single crystals, and thin layers. His current research focuses on oxide perovskites, organometallic lead halide perovskites, and oxides with fluorite structures.

== Distinctions ==
Damjanovic is an IEEE Fellow, a Fellow of the American Ceramic Society, and served as the President of the IEEE Ultrasonics, Ferroelectrics and Frequency Control Society (UFFC-S) from 2024 to 2025.

He is the recipient of the 2021 Humboldt Research Award, the 2020 Distinguished Service Award of the IEEE Ultrasonics, Ferroelectrics and Frequency Control Society, the 2018 IEEE Robert E. Newnham Ferroelectrics Award, the 2017 International Award of the Japanese conference on Ferroelectric Materials and Their Applications, the 2009 Rodolphe and René Haenny Award, and the 2009 Ferroelectrics Recognition Award of the IEEE UFFC-S. He was distinguished lecturer for the IEEE UFFC-S in 2010/2011. He was elected to the Academy of Sciences and Arts of Bosnia and Herzegovina in 2022.

== Selected works ==
- Rödel, Jürgen; Jo, Wook; Seifert, Klaus T. P.; Anton, Eva-Maria; Granzow, Torsten; Damjanovic, Dragan (June 2009). "Perspective on the Development of Lead-free Piezoceramics". Journal of the American Ceramic Society. 92 (6): 1153–1177. doi:10.1111/j.1551-2916.2009.03061.x. ISSN 0002-7820.
- Damjanovic, Dragan (1998-09-01). "Ferroelectric, dielectric and piezoelectric properties of ferroelectric thin films and ceramics". Reports on Progress in Physics. 61 (9): 1267–1324. Bibcode:1998RPPh...61.1267D. doi:10.1088/0034-4885/61/9/002. ISSN 0034-4885. S2CID 250873563.
- Setter, N.; Damjanovic, D.; Eng, L.; Fox, G.; Gevorgian, S.; Hong, S.; Kingon, A.; Kohlstedt, H.; Park, N. Y.; Stephenson, G. B.; Stolitchnov, I. (September 2006). "Ferroelectric thin films: Review of materials, properties, and applications". Journal of Applied Physics. 100 (5): 051606–051606–46. Bibcode:2006JAP...100e1606S. doi:10.1063/1.2336999. ISSN 0021-8979.
- Hollenstein, Evelyn; Davis, Matthew; Damjanovic, Dragan; Setter, Nava (2005-10-31). "Piezoelectric properties of Li- and Ta-modified (K0.5Na0.5)NbO3 ceramics". Applied Physics Letters. 87 (18): 182905. Bibcode:2005ApPhL..87r2905H. doi:10.1063/1.2123387. ISSN 0003-6951.
- Rödel, Jürgen; Webber, Kyle G.; Dittmer, Robert; Jo, Wook; Kimura, Masahiko; Damjanovic, Dragan (June 2015). "Transferring lead-free piezoelectric ceramics into application". Journal of the European Ceramic Society. 35 (6): 1659–1681. doi:10.1016/j.jeurceramsoc.2014.12.013. ISSN 0955-2219. S2CID 135725720.
- Maeder, M. Demartin; Damjanovic, D.; Setter, N. (July 2004). "Lead Free Piezoelectric Materials". Journal of Electroceramics. 13 (1–3): 385–392. doi:10.1007/s10832-004-5130-y. ISSN 1385-3449. S2CID 137159274.
- Damjanovic, Dragan (October 2005). "Contributions to the Piezoelectric Effect in Ferroelectric Single Crystals and Ceramics". Journal of the American Ceramic Society. 88 (10): 2663–2676. doi:10.1111/j.1551-2916.2005.00671.x. ISSN 0002-7820. S2CID 136613319.
- Jo, Wook; Granzow, Torsten; Aulbach, Emil; Rödel, Jürgen; Damjanovic, Dragan (May 2009). "Origin of the large strain response in (K0.5Na0.5)NbO3-modified (Bi0.5Na0.5)TiO3–BaTiO3 lead-free piezoceramics". Journal of Applied Physics. 105 (9): 094102–094102–5. Bibcode:2009JAP...105i4102J. doi:10.1063/1.3121203. ISSN 0021-8979. S2CID 119594768.
- Damjanovic, Dragan (2010-08-09). "A morphotropic phase boundary system based on polarization rotation and polarization extension". Applied Physics Letters. 97 (6): 062906. arXiv:1007.4394. Bibcode:2010ApPhL..97f2906D. doi:10.1063/1.3479479. ISSN 0003-6951. S2CID 118494420.
- Damjanovic, Dragan (1997-08-15). "Stress and frequency dependence of the direct piezoelectric effect in ferroelectric ceramics". Journal of Applied Physics. 82 (4): 1788–1797. Bibcode:1997JAP....82.1788D. doi:10.1063/1.365981. ISSN 0021-8979.
