= Dragoljub =

Slavic masculine given name

- Pronunciation: Serbo-Croatian: [drâɡoʎuːb]
- Gender: masculine

Origin
- Language: Slavic
- Origin: drag ("dear, precious") and ljub ("love")
- Meaning: dear love
- Region of origin: Eastern Europe

Other names
- Alternative spelling: Драгољуб
- Nickname: Draža
- Related names: Drago, Dragan, Dragomir, Dragoslav, Ljubodrag, Milodrag

Dragoljub (Cyrillic: Драгољуб) is a Serbian masculine given name, derived from Slavic drag- ("dear, beloved") and ljub ("love, to like"), both very common in Slavic dithematic names. It roughly means "dear love". A diminutve is Draža.

Notable people with the name include:

- Dragoljub Acković (1952–2025), Serbian Romani writer, activist, and politician
- Dragoljub Anđelković (born 1993), Serbian footballer
- Dragoljub Avramović (born 1979), Serbian basketball coach
- Dragoljub Bekvalac (born 1952), Serbian football player and coach
- Dragoljub Blažić (1938–1991), Yugoslav footballer
- Dragoljub Brnović (born 1963), Montenegrin footballer
- Dragoljub Bursać, Serbian footballer
- Dragoljub Čirić (1935–2014), Serbian chess player
- Dragoljub Đuričić (1953–2021), Serbian-Montenegrin drummer
- Dragoljub Ilić (born 1956), Serbian musician, songwriter, and composer
- Dragoljub Jacimović (born 1964), Macedonian chess player
- Dragoljub Janošević (1923–1993), Serbian chess player
- Dragoljub Jeličić (1902–1963), Serbian soldier
- Dragoljub Jeremić (1978–2022), Serbian footballer
- Dragoljub Jovanovich (1916–1983), Serbian-American inventor and helicopter designer
- Dragoljub Kojčić (born 1954), Serbian politician and author
- Dragoljub Kostić (born 1950), Serbian footballer
- Dragoljub Ljubičić (born 1962), Serbian actor and comedian
- Dragoljub Mićović (1929–2015), Serbian architect and writer
- Dragoljub Mićunović (1930–2026), Serbian politician and philosopher
- Dragoljub Mihailović (1893–1946), Serbian military general
- Dragoljub Milošević (1929–2005), Serbian football player and coach
- Dragoljub Minić (1937–2005), Yugoslav chess player
- Dragoljub Ojdanić (1941–2020), Serbian military general
- Dragoljub Pavlović (1867–1920), Serbian politician and historian
- Dragoljub Pavlović (1875–1956), Serbian painter
- Dragoljub Pljakić (1937–2011), Serbian basketball player and coach
- Dragoljub Popović (born 1951), Serbian judge
- Dragoljub Prcać (born 1937), Bosnian Serb war criminal
- Dragoljub Radulović (born 1964), Serbian judoka
- Dragoljub Savić (born 2001), Serbian footballer
- Dragoljub Simić (born 1951), Bosnian footballer
- Dragoljub Simonović (footballer) (born 1972), Serbian-Bulgarian footballer
- Dragoljub Simonović (politician) (born 1959), Serbian politician
- Dragoljub Srnić (born 1992), Serbian footballer
- Dragoljub Stamenković (1954–2025), Serbian politician
- Dragoljub Velimirović (1942–2014), Serbian chess player
- Dragoljub Vidačić (born 1970), Serbian basketball player and coach
- Dragoljub Zindović (born 1965), Serbian politician

== See also ==
- Ljubodrag (given name)
- Slavic names
