= Dragan Trajković =

Serbian footballer

Personal information
- Full name: Dragan Trajković
- Date of birth: 7 July 1986 (age 40)
- Place of birth: Leskovac, SFR Yugoslavia
- Height: 1.78 m (5 ft 10 in)
- Position: Midfielder

Senior career*
Years	Team	Apps	(Gls)
2002–2005	Dubočica		
2004	→ Mladost Lučani (loan)	1	(0)
2005–2006	Sloga Leskovac		
2006–2007	Borac Čačak	0	(0)
2007	Vardar	2	(0)
2008–2009	Dubočica		
2009	→ Mladost Lučani (loan)	15	(0)
2009–2010	Dinamo Vranje	40	(0)
2010	Radnički Niš		
2011–2012	Laçi	20	(2)
2012–2014	Dubočica	26	(0)
- * Club domestic league appearances and goals as of 4 March 2015

Dragan Trajković (Serbian Cyrillic: Драган Трајковић; born 7 July 1986) is a Serbian football midfielder.

== Career ==
Born in Leskovac, where he started his football career, in local club Dubočica. He made 9 appearances in his first season. Later he played for Mladost Lučani in two times, both as a loaned player of Dubočica. In the meantime, he was with Sloga Leskovac, Borac Čačak, and Vardar. After second period he spent in Dubočica and Mladost Lučani, he played for Dinamo Vranje, Radnički Niš, and Laçi. Then he returned in Dubočica for the third time. Dubočica dissolved in 2014.
