= -drag =

Slavic name lexeme

-drag (Cyrillic: -драг) and -drog is a common Slavic given name lexeme, drag meaning "dear, beloved", in single-lexemed and dithematic names. For any of these given names, "Draža" may be a diminutive. Other names with the stem Draž- include Draž, Dražan, Dražen.

== Single-lexeme names ==
- Serbo-Croatian Dragan (m.); Dragana (f.) (with past participle suffix -an)
- Serbo-Croatian Dragić (m.) (with diminutive suffix -ić)
- Serbo-Croatian Dragica (f.) (with suffix -ica)
- Serbo-Croatian Dragoje (m.) (with suffix -oje)
- Serbo-Croatian Dragaš (m.) (with suffix -aš)
- Serbo-Croatian Dragoš (m.) (with suffix -oš)
- Serbo-Croatian Dragiša (m.) (with suffix -iša)
- Serbo-Croatian Dragutin (m.) (with suffix -utin)

== Dithematic names ==
Only masculine names are listed. -a is simply added to produce feminine forms.

Prefixed

- Serbo-Croatian Dragimir, Dragomir (from mir, "peace, world")
- Serbo-Croatian Dragislav, Dragoslav (m.); Dragoslava (f.) (from slava, "glory, fame")
- Serbo-Croatian Dragivoj, Dragivoje (from voj, "war")
- Serbo-Croatian Dragoljub (from ljub, "love, to like")
- Serbo-Croatian Dragorad (from rad, "happy, eager, to care")
- Serbo-Croatian Dragosav (from sav, "all, every")

Suffixed

- Serbo-Croatian Ljubodrag (from ljub, "love, to like")
- Serbo-Croatian Milidrag, Milodrag (from milo, "love, to like")
- Serbo-Croatian Miodrag (from mio, "tender, cute")
- Serbo-Croatian Predrag (from pre, "very, much")
- Serbo-Croatian Svedrag (from sve, "all")
- Serbo-Croatian Vojdrag, Vojidrag (from voj, "war")
- Serbo-Croatian Vukdrag, Vukodrag (from vuk, "wolf")
- Serbo-Croatian Živodrag (from živo, "living")

== See also ==
- Slavic dithematic names
