= Dragan Veljković =

Serbian politician

Dragan Veljković (Serbian Cyrillic: Драган Вељковић; born 1964) is a politician in Serbia. He has served in the National Assembly of Serbia since 2016 as a member of the Serbian Progressive Party.

== Early life and career ==
Veljković was born in Štrpce, Autonomous Province of Kosovo and Metohija, then part of the Socialist Republic of Serbia in the Socialist Federal Republic of Yugoslavia. He still resides in the community. By profession, he is a lawyer.

In February 2001, in the aftermath of the Kosovo War and the 1999 NATO bombing of Yugoslavia, Veljković was wounded in a sniper attack while on the road from Štrpce to Uroševac. B92 indicated that the shooting had been perpetrated by an Albanian extremist group in Kosovo. This incident, along with other shootings on the same day, prompted mass protests by the local Kosovo Serb community.

He represented the poet Petar Sarić in a legal action against a member of the Kosovo Police and a policeman from the United States of America in 2002. Sarić said that the American officer had attacked him after talking to the Kosovo Police officer, and that the attack had left him with serious head and spine wounds.

Veljković served as president of the Red Cross steering committee in Štrpce in 2006, and in this capacity wrote an article to the paper Glas javnosti indicating that residents of the city often had access to electricity for only a few hours per day.

== Political career ==
Veljković received the 119th position on the Progressive Party's Aleksandar Vučić — Serbia is winning electoral list for the 2016 parliamentary election and was elected when the list won a majority victory with 131 out 250 mandates. He is a member of the assembly committee on the diaspora and Serbs in the region; a deputy member of the committee on the judiciary, public administration, and local self-government; a deputy member of the committee on the economy, regional development, trade, tourism, and energy; a deputy member of the European integration committee; a deputy member of the committee on Kosovo-Metohija; and a member of the parliamentary friendship groups with Belarus, China, Greece, Italy, Kazakhstan, Russia, and Spain.
