= Dragan Savkić =

Serbian politician

Officer at National Assembly of Serbia

Personal details
- Born: Драган Савкић; 1947 (age 78–79)

Dragan Savkić (Serbian Cyrillic: Драган Савкић; born 1947) is a politician in Serbia. He has served in the National Assembly of Serbia since 2016 as a member of the Serbian Progressive Party.

== Political career ==
Savkić is the leader of Progressive Party's municipal organization in Sopot. He led the party's electoral list for the Sopot municipal assembly in the 2012 local elections.

Savkić received the 115th position on the Progressive Party's Aleksandar Vučić – Serbia Is Winning list in the 2016 Serbian parliamentary election and was elected when the list won a majority victory with 131 out of 250 mandates.

He is currently a member of the assembly committee on labour, social issues, social inclusion, and poverty reduction; a deputy member of the agriculture, forestry, and water management committee; and a member of the parliamentary friendship groups with Austria, Belarus, France, Greece, Kazakhstan, and Russia.

== Personal life ==
Savkić currently lives in Belgrade municipality of Sopot. He previously worked in real estate.
