= Dragan Aleksić (politician) =

Serbian politician (born 1963)

Dragan Aleksić (Serbian Cyrillic: Драган Алексић, born 17 November 1963) is a politician from Serbia. A member of the National Assembly of Serbia from 2014 to 2016, he is currently the head of the municipality (i.e., mayor) of Osečina. Aleksić is a member of the Serbian Progressive Party.

== Private career ==
Aleksić has a degree from the Faculty of Mechanical Engineering in Belgrade and was co-owner and director of the company Dal d.o.o. Osečina from 1998 to 2014.

== Political career ==
Aleksić was a candidate of the Serbian Radical Party on several occasions in the 1990s and 2000s. In the 1997 parliamentary election, he received the fifth position on the party's electoral list for the Valjevo division; the party won only one mandate for the area, and he was not elected.

Serbia's electoral system was reformed in 2000, with the entire country becoming a single electoral division. Aleksić received the 158th position (out of 250) on the Radical Party's list in the 2000 Serbian parliamentary election, the 224th position on its list in the 2003 election, and the 249th position in the 2007 election. From 2000 to 2011, Serbian parliamentary mandates were awarded to sponsoring parties or coalitions rather than to individual candidates, and it was common practice for mandates to be awarded out of numerical order. Aleksić could have been selected as part of the Radical Party's delegation on any of these occasions notwithstanding his low numerical positions, although in fact he was not.

Aleksić also led the Radical Party's municipal electoral lists for Osečina in 2004 and 2008.

The Radical Party split in 2008, with Tomislav Nikolić and Aleksandar Vučić forming a breakaway group called the Serbian Progressive Party. Aleksić sided with the Progressives and became the party's founding local president in Osečina. He received the 152nd position on the Progressive-led Aleksandar Vučić — Future We Believe In list for the 2014 parliamentary election and was declared elected when the list won a landslide victory with 158 mandates. For the next two years, he served as a parliamentary supporter of Vučić's administration. During his time in parliament, Aleksić was a deputy member of the committee on spatial planning, transport, infrastructure, and telecommunications and a member of the parliamentary friendship groups for Albania, Austria, the Czech Republic, Italy, Romania, and Slovakia.

He was not a candidate in the 2016 parliamentary election but instead led the Progressive Party's list for municipal elections in Osečina and was selected as mayor following the party's victory.
