= Dragana Popović =

Yugoslav-American physicist

Dragana Popović is a physicist from the former country of Yugoslavia who works in the US as a research professor at Florida State University and research faculty in the National High Magnetic Field Laboratory. Her research is in experimental condensed matter physics, and especially the use of electric transport and of resistance noise spectroscopy to study electromagnetic behavior on the mesoscopic scale at the interfaces between insulators and semiconductors, metals, and superconductors.

== Education and career ==
Popović graduated from the University of Belgrade in 1983, with a bachelor's degree in physics. She continued her studies at Brown University, receiving a master's degree in 1985 and completing her Ph.D. in 1989.

After postdoctoral research at Brown University and the IBM T.J. Watson Research Center, Popović joined the City College of New York as an assistant professor of physics in 1993. After visiting the National High Magnetic Field Laboratory from 1995 to 1997, she moved from City College to the laboratory in 1997; she has been a senior scientist there since 2004, and a research professor at Florida State University since 2017.

== Recognition ==
Popović was named as a Fellow of the American Physical Society (APS) in 2012, after a nomination from the APS Division of Condensed Matter Physics, "for experimental studies of glassy behavior in strongly correlated systems near the metal-insulator transition".
