= Dragana Kostić =

Serbian politician

Dragana Kostić (Serbian Cyrillic: Драгана Костић; born 1971) is a politician in Serbia. She has served in the National Assembly of Serbia since 2016 as a member of the Serbian Progressive Party.

== Private career ==
Kostić lives in Sokobanja. She is a graduate economist and has been deputy director of the public enterprise PEU "Resavica."

== Political career ==
Kostić was a founding member of the Serbian Progressive Party in Sokobanja in 2008. She was the vice-president of the party's municipal committee from 2008 to 2015 and now serves as a Progressive Party member of the municipal assembly.

She received the 108th position on the party's Aleksandar Vučić – Serbia Is Winning coalition electoral list for the 2016 Serbian parliamentary election and was elected when the list won 131 out of 250 parliamentary mandates. She is currently a deputy member of the parliamentary committee on human and minority rights and gender equality; a deputy member of the committee on Kosovo-Metohija; a deputy member of culture and information committee; the head of the parliamentary friendship group with Poland; and a member of the parliamentary friendship groups with Belarus, China, the Czech Republic, Indonesia, Kazakhstan, Russia, and the United Kingdom.
