= Dragan Ćirjanić =

Serbian filmmaker (born 1954)

Dragan M. Ćirjanić
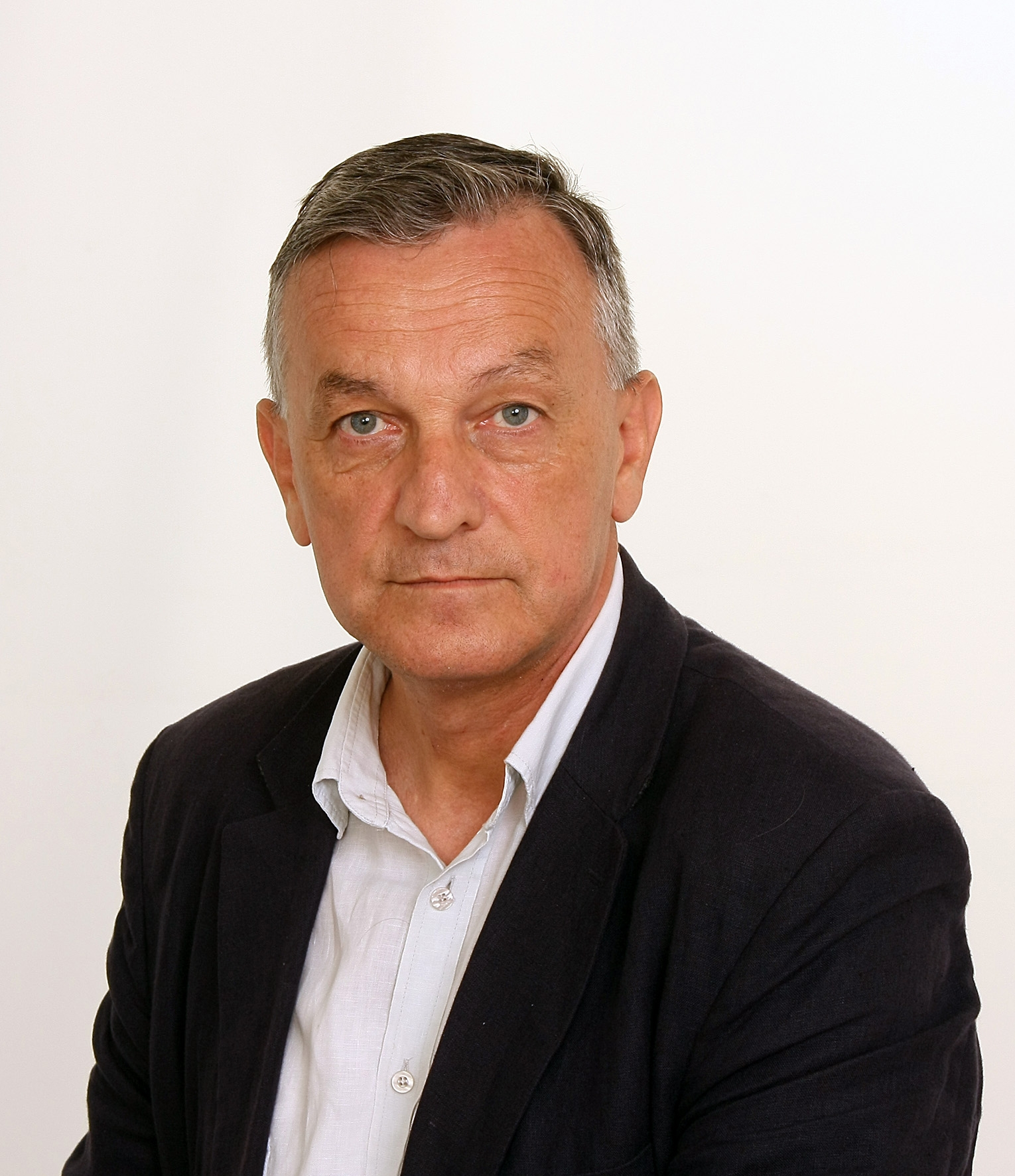
- Dragan M. Ćirjanić in 2017
- Born: 1954 (age 71–72); Belgrade, PR Serbia, FPR Yugoslavia
- Occupations: Film director, screenwriter, producer

Dragan M. Ćirjanić (Serbian Cyrillic: Драган М. Ћирјанић; Belgrade, 1954) is a Serbian film and television director, screenwriter, producer and writer.

He is known for films and series treating Serbian, Balkan and Eurasian tradition.

== Biography ==
He was born in Belgrade, where he graduated from Mathematical high school. He graduated from Faculty of Dramatic Arts (University of Arts in Belgrade) in Belgrade in 1983, at the Department of Film and TV directing.

Since 1987 he works at TV Belgrade/Radio Television of Serbia in multiple editorials and with various TV forms, mostly in General Education and Documentary editorial, where he worked on themes of Serbian and European tradition. Presently he works in Educational-Scientific editorial of RTS. He lived in the United States of America on a study journey since 1989 til 1993.

With Dragoš Kalajić he created a series "Mont Blanc" ("Mon Blan", 1996–1997). Prominent among his TV works are "Solidarity of the Samurai", "Vladimir Ćorović", "Dragutin Inkiostri", a cycle of movies "Russian White Builders" and "We the cadets, we the children of Russia", series about Milan Kašanin, "Our father, where are you?" about the fate of painter Branko Popović, "How to love a river", "Troitskosavsk — Kyakhta of count Sava Vladislavić", "Divine glow of the Milanković canon"...

He is preparing a mini series about Milutin Milanković, as well as a feature live action film about the count Sava Vladislavić.

He is a contributor to several journals where he writes about various themes from art, spirituality and history. Lives and works in Belgrade. He is a member of Association of Serbian Film Artists.

== Filmography (choice) ==
- Lautreamont (Lotreamon, 1987)
- How to love a river (Kako voleti reku, 1988), special award at Prix Italia 1989.
- Triballi necklaces (Tribalske grivne, 1995), festival in Nancy, France
- The Way of Father Tadey (Put oca Tadeja, 1996), series, 1-3
- Eminent Serbs — Vladimir Ćorović (Znameniti Srbi — Vladimir Ćorović, 1998)
- Holy Mountains of Mokra Gora (Mokrogorsko sveto gorje, 1998)
- Village architecture, between the real and possible (Seoska arhitektura, između stvarnog i mogućeg, 1998)
- Russian White Builders (Ruski beli neimari, 2001), series, 1-4. First episode, Second episode, Third episode and Fourth episode, 2001.
- The bells of Church of Saint Sava (Zvona hrama Sv. Save, 2002)
- Aged Old Mountain (Ostarela Stara planina, 2002)
- Shadows of Plavinac (Senke Plavinca, 2003)
- Quiet man from Ljubiš (Tihi čovek iz Ljubiša, 2004)
- Sky belongs to us (Nebo pripada nama, 2004)
- In the constellation of the great ones — Milutin Milanković (U sazvežđu velikana — Milutin Milanković, 2005)
- Dignity and hope (Dostojanstvo i nada, 2006)
- Dragutin Medenjak Inkiostri — a Serbian style (Dragutin Medenjak Inkiostri — jedan srpski stil, 2006)
- We, the cadets, we, the children of Russia (Mi kadeti, mi deca Rusije, 2006-2011), series of three parts: 1. We the cadets, we, the children of Russia (Mi kadeti, mi deca Rusije, 2006), 2. Pilgrims (Hodočasnici, 2009), 3. Even one soldier makes an army (I jedan vojnik čini vojsku, 2011)
- Sky does connect us (Nebo nas ipak spaja, 2007)
- Solidarity of the samurai (Solidarnost samuraja, 2007)
- Waters holy and waters damned (Vode svete i vode proklete, 2007)
- Fatherly home of Milutin Milanković (Očinski dom Milutina Milankovića, 2007)
- Prince Paul — the fatal 27th of March (Knez Pavle — kobni 27. mart, 2008)
- Milanković — forever (Milanković — per sempre, 2009)
- Milan Kašanin (Milan Kašanin, 2009), mini-series: 1. Milan Kašanin — a conservative revolutionary (Milan Kašanin - konzervativni revolucionar), 2. The glory of Middle Ages (Sjaj srednjeg veka), 3. Museum of prince Paul (Muzej kneza Pavla), 4. Museum of prince Paul - the epilogue (Muzej kneza Pavla - epilog)
- Animosity and glory (Merzost i sjaj, 2009)
- Our father, where are you? (Oče naš, gde si?, 2010)
- Troitskosavsk — Kyakhta of the count Sava Vladislavić (Troickosavsk — Kjahta grofa Save Vladislavića). (2013)
- The secret of a necropolis (Tajna jedne nekropole, 2015).
- Mileva Marić — A Secret (Mileva Marić — Jedna tajna, 2015).
- Holy fire, victory of faith (Blagodatni oganj, pobeda vere, 2016)..
- Old Serbian written heritage: The Church of the Blessed Virgin in Zemun ("Staro srpsko pisano nasleđe: Bogorodičina crkva u Zemunu"), First part, Second part (2016).
- The Hell of Independent State of Croatia 1 (Pakao Nezavisne Države Hrvatske 1), Museum of genocide victims — official channel on YouTube, Belgrade (2016)
- Divine glow of the Milanković canon (Božanski sjaj Milankovićevog kanona, 2017). RTS — official channel
- Pupin's fairy tale (Pupinova bajka, 2017)
- Sava Lozanić's bells (Zvona Save Lozanića, 2017), RTS — official channel

== Essays and other texts (choice) ==
- A house older than itself ("Kuća starija od sebe same"), in a book Belgrade, the city of secrets, 2004.
- Curzio Malaparte, that damned Tuscan ("Kurcio Malaparte, taj prokleti Toskanac"), magazine A Guide for Life (Vodič za život), published also in E-nation (E-nacija), 2005.
- War and Love of Drieu La Rochelle ("Rat i ljubav Drije la Rošela"), magazine A Guide for Life (Vodič za život), 2011.
- Dragoš-day Speech (Beseda za Dragošdan, Jugoslovenska kinoteka, Belgrade, December 6, 2012.)
- Sava Vladislavić Returned Home (On St. Sava Day, In Herceg-Novi, consecrated the monument to a famous count), Serbia, national review (Srbija, nacionalna revija), Belgrade, 2014, N. 42.
- With the State in heart: Count Sava Vladislavić (1668-1738), Czar's adviser and confident diplomat of Peter the Great, the most powerful Serb of 18th century ("S Državom u srcu: Grof Sava Vladislavić (1668-1738), carski savetnik i poverljivi diplomata Petra Velikog, najmoćniji Srbin XVIII veka"), Nacija, Belgrade, October 3, 2015.
- Legend of Céline the Magnificent ("Legenda o Selinu Veličanstvenom") - (Along with "Bagatele za jedan pokolj", published by "Ukronija"), Nacija, Belgrade, November 5, 2015.
- Dragoš Kalajić, a man who was awake in Europe's night ("Dragoš Kalajić, čovek koji je u noći Evrope bio budan"), Novi standard, November 23, 2015. (introduction for the repeated release of the book"End of the World" ("Смак света") by Dragoš Kalajić)
- Courts of Light of Dragoš Kalajić (for the retrospective exhibition in the RTS gallery) ("Dvorovi svetlosti Dragoša Kalajića (povodom retrospektivne izložbe slika u galeriji RTS-a), Nacija, Belgrade, July 4th 2016.
- Familiar voice from great distances: Milan Kašanin, a conservative revolutionary and initiate into the codes of Serbian Golden Middle Ages ("Poznati glas iz velikih daljina: Milan Kašanin (1895-1981), konzervativni revolucionar u kulturi i posvećenik u kodove srpskog zlatnog srednjovekovlja"), Nacija, Belgrade, August 8, 2016.
- Ritual for Sunreturn ("Obred za Suncovrat" (Novo Miloševo, Banat, "Mala noćna galerija"), Nacija, Belgrade, January 26, 2017.

== Prizes and awards ==
- Special jury award on TV festival Prix Italia, Italy, Perugia, for film "How to love river", Specijalna nagrada žirija na TV festivalu Prix Italia, Peruđa, za film "Kako voleti reku", 1989.
- Special award on the festival "Bdenje duše" in Sremski Karlovci, for film "Our father, where are you?" (Specijalno priznanje festivala Bdenje duše u Sremskim Karlovcima, za film "Oče naš, gde si?"), 2011.
