= Dragoslav Čakić =

Croatian footballer

Drago Čakić
Personal information
- Full name: Dragoslav Čakić
- Date of birth: 15 February 1965 (age 61)
- Place of birth: Split, SFR Yugoslavia
- Height: 1.84 m (6 ft 1/2 in)
- Position: Midfielder

Senior career*
Years	Team	Apps	(Gls)
1984–1986	RNK Split	52	(6)
1986–1987	Hajduk Split	7	(0)
1987–1988	Burgos	10	(0)
1988–1991	Xerez	61	(5)
1994–1995	Jerez Industrial		
1995–1996	San Fernando		
1996–1997	Ourense	33	(3)
1997–1998	Xerez	25	(0)
1998–1999	Tortosa		
- * Club domestic league appearances and goals

Dragoslav 'Drago' Čakić (born 15 February 1965 in Split, Croatia, Socialist Federal Republic of Yugoslavia) is a Croatian retired footballer who played as a midfielder.

== Club career ==
In his country, Čakić represented hometown clubs RNK Split and HNK Hajduk Split. In the 1987 summer he moved to Spain, where he remained until his retirement 12 years later, starting with Real Burgos CF in Segunda División.

Čakić also played professionally in the country with Xerez CD (two spells, being relegated from the second level in 1991 and 1998) and CD Ourense. He competed at amateur level with Jerez Industrial CF, CD San Fernando and CD Tortosa, retiring in June 1999 at the age of 34.
