= Dragana Tripković =

Montenegrin poet, playwright and journalist

- Born: 26 April 1984 (age 41); Cetinje
- Education: University of Montenegro
- Occupations: poet, writer
- Employer: Vijesti

Dragana Gaga Tripković (born 26 April 1984) is a Montenegrin poet, playwright and journalist. She is the vice president of PEN Montenegro and her poetry is available in a number of languages.

== Life ==
Tripković was born in 1984 in Cetinje and she graduated in drama from the University of Montenegro. In 2011 she founded and led a theatre organisation titled the "Alternative Theatre Active Company". The members of the organisation translated the Belgian play "Blind" by Nobel laureate Maurice Maeterlinck. In 2012 and 2013 she was awarded the Sea of Words prize for her short stories by the Anna Lindh Foundation.

In 2014 she joined the council of the national broadcaster Radio and Television of Montenegro and served for five years.

She is mentioned in Europe: An Encyclopedia of Culture and Society in 2023 in the chapter about Montenegro as a writer of Montenegrin. Tripković writes for Montenegro's newspaper Vijesti in the country's capital Podgorica.

In 2016 she created an anthology of Albanian poetry titled, "Kaplje: antologija albanske proze i poezije" translated by Shkëlzen Maliqi.

In 2020 her work was published in German translated by Cornelia Marks, "Verses from Sand: Mediterranean cycle and other poems" (Verse aus Sand: mediterraner Zyklus und andere Gedichte) and she edited a poetry anthology, with Saladin Burdžović, titled "Revolucija i njena kopilad: poezija 1990-2020". Her poetry has been translated into Albanian, English, German, Italian, Polish, Latvian, Macedonian and the Russian language.
