= Dragan Nešić =

Serbian artist

Dragan Nešić is an artist, and a member of the Serbian Fine Arts Association. He was born on 13 May 1954, in Kruševac, Serbia. He holds a degree in physics, which he earned at the University of Sarajevo.

Nešić has taken part in over 400 exhibitions and projects in more than twenty countries, and is the author of several international projects such as Leave Your Trace, Religion and Art, and The Line of Friendship. He is currently a curator for the Spirala gallery in Priboj.

Nešić received the Schlossberg Stipend (Dr. Esther Schloßberg-Stiftung) for 2006.
