= Dragica Ponorac =

Montenegro diplomat

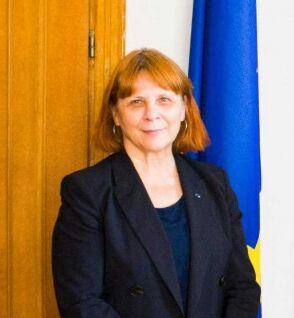

Dragica Ponorac is a Montenegro diplomat currently serving as Montenegro Ambassador Extraordinary and Plenipotentiary to Ukraine and Armenia.

== Biography ==
Dragica Ponorac graduated from the Faculty of Political Science at the University of Zagreb and the Faculty of Philology in Zadar.

In 2010, she joined the Department of Bilateral Relations of the Ministry of Foreign Affairs and European Integration as Director of North, Central and South America, Asia, Africa, Australia, the Pacific and the Middle East.

In 2014, she was appointed Ambassador Extraordinary and Plenipotentiary of Montenegro to France, Paris. Since September 2015 – Permanent Representative of Montenegro to UNESCO.

From June 18, 2020 – Ambassador Extraordinary and Plenipotentiary of Montenegro to Ukraine, Kyiv.

She presented her letter of credence to Armenian President Armen Sarkissian on 24 May 2021.
