= Dragiša =

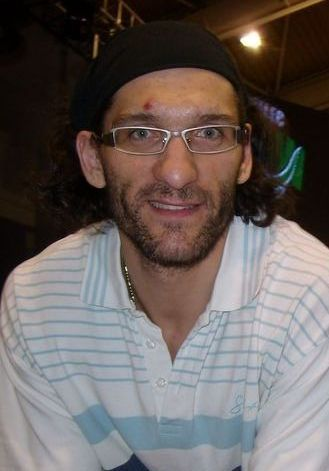
Dragiša Drobnjak

Dragiša (Cyrillic: Драгиша) is a version of the masculine given name Drago, and may refer to:

- Dragiša Binić (born 1961), Serbian footballer
- Dragiša Brašovan (1887–1965), Serbian modernist architect
- Dragiša Burzan (born 1950), Serbia and Montenegro ambassador to London since 2004
- Dragiša Cvetković (1893–1969), Yugoslav politician
- Dragiša Drobnjak (born 1977), Slovenian professional basketball player
- Dragiša Lapčević (1867–1939), Serbian politician
- Dragiša Pejović (born 1982), Serbian Football player
- Dragiša Pešić (born 1954), politician from Montenegro
- Dragiša Stanisavljević (born 1921), Serbian naive art sculptor
- Dragiša Vasić (1885–1945), Serbian lawyer and writer
- Dragiša Žunić (born 1978), Serbian footballer

== See also ==
- Drago (disambiguation)
