= Draža Mihailović Cup =

The Draža Mihailović Cup (DMC) is an annual Australian basketball tournament for basketball clubs with Serb ethnic affiliation. The first edition of the tournament was held in 1993, it has steadily grown to encompass clubs from across the country.

KK Sydney Obilic recently won the 2025 edition of the tournament in Brisbane, defeating the back to back champions KK Otpisani Melbourne. The MVP was Alexei Piljevic.

The tournament is named after Chetnik leader Draža Mihailović, who led the first European uprising against Nazi Germany in World War II.

== List of winners ==
Year	Host	Winner	Runner Up
2025	Brisbane	Sydney Obilic	KK Otpisani Melbourne
2024	Adelaide	KK Otpisani Melbourne	Sydney Obilic
2023	Melbourne	KK Otpisani Melbourne	Sydney Obilic
2022	Wollongong	Sydney Obilic	Red Stars South
2021	Tournament Postponed	due to COVID-19	
2020	Tournament Postponed	due to COVID-19	
2019	Brisbane	Sydney Obilic	Brisbane White Eagles
2018	Adelaide	Sydney Obilic	Brisbane White Eagles
2017	Melbourne	Monstars Melbourne	Melbourne White Eagles
2016	Sydney	Red Stars Sydney	Sydney Obilic
2015	Brisbane	Sydney Obilic	Brisbane White Eagles
2014	Adelaide	Melbourne White Eagles	Sydney Obilic
2013	Melbourne	Melbourne White Eagles	KK Otpisani Melbourne
2012	Sydney	Sydney Obilic	Brisbane White Eagles
2011	Brisbane	Brisbane White Eagles	Sydney Obilic
2010	Adelaide	Sydney Obilic	Brisbane White Eagles
2009	Melbourne	Sydney Obilic	Melbourne White Eagles
2008	Sydney	Sydney Obilic	Brisbane White Eagles
2007	Brisbane	Brisbane White Eagles	Sydney Obilic
2006	Adelaide	Sydney Obilic	Brisbane White Eagles
2005	Albury/Wodonga	Brisbane White Eagles	Adelaide Beograd
2004	Melbourne	Sydney Obilic	Melbourne Gamblers
2003	Sydney	Adelaide Beograd	Sydney Obilic
2002	Melbourne	Sydney Obilic	Melbourne White Eagles
2001	Canberra	Sydney Sokolovi	Adelaide Beograd
2000	Sydney	Sydney Sokolovi	Sydney Obilic
1999	Melbourne	Sydney Sokolovi	Adelaide Golubovi
1998	Adelaide	Adelaide Golubovi	Melbourne White Eagles
1997	Sydney	Sydney Sokolovi	Melbourne White Eagles
1996	Melbourne	Sydney Sokolovi	Melbourne White Eagles
1995	Adelaide	Melbourne White Eagles	Sydney Delije
1994	Sydney	Melbourne White Eagles	Sydney Delije
1993	Melbourne	Sydney Delije	Melbourne White Eagles

== Total championships ==
Club	Number of Championships	Runners Up
Sydney Obilic	12	8
Sydney Sokolovi	5	0
Melbourne White Eagles	4	7
Brisbane White Eagles	3	7
KK Otpisani Melbourne	2	2
Adelaide Beograd	1	2
Adelaide Golubovi	1	1
Monstars Melbourne	1	0
Red Stars Sydney	1	0
Sydney Delije	1	2

== Most Valuable Players (MVP) ==
Year	Player	Team
2025	Alexei Piljevic	Sydney Obilic
2024	Adam Thoesby	KK Otpisani Melbourne
2023	Milan Savic	KK Otpisani Melbourne
2006	Đorđe Đorđević	Sydney Obilić
2005	Not Given	
2004	Stevan Šipka	Sydney Obilić
2003	Cameron McKinnon	Adelaide Beograd
2002	Vladimir Jankovic	Sydney Obilić
2001	Cameron McKinnon	Adelaide Beograd
2000	Milorad Mendebaba	Melbourne White Eagles
1999	Zoran Jaglica	Sydney Sokolovi
1998	Damijan Jelić	Adelaide Beograd
1997	Milan Jaglica	Sydney Sokolovi
1996	Stevan Šipka	Sydney Sokolovi
1995	Vladimir Gak	Melbourne White Eagles
1994	Staniša "Steve" Simić	Melbourne White Eagles
1993	Milan Vranjkovic	Sydney Delije
