= Dragan Kavaz =

Bosnia and Herzegovina footballer

Personal information
- Date of birth: 4 December 1966 (age 59)
- Place of birth: SFR Yugoslavia
- Height: 1.84 m (6 ft 0 in)
- Position: Defender

Senior career*
Years	Team	Apps	(Gls)
–1988	Kabel		
1988–1990	FK Novi Sad		
1990–1993	Napredak Kruševac		
1993–1994	SG 01 Hoechst		
1995–1996	Rot-Weiß Erfurt	37	(0)
1996–1997	SV Elversberg	11	(0)
1997–1999	Chemnitzer FC	10	(0)
1999–2002	FC Bargau		
- * Club domestic league appearances and goals

Dragan Kavaz (Serbian Cyrillic: Драган Каваз; born 4 December 1966) is a Bosnian retired footballer who played as a defender.
