= Nava Setter =

Israeli and Swiss materials engineer

Nava Setter (Hebrew: נאוה סתר; born 1949) is a retired Israeli and Swiss materials scientist focusing on electroceramics including ferroelectric and piezoelectric materials, thin films and thick films of ceramics, and microsensors and microactuators. She is a professor emeritus at the École Polytechnique Fédérale de Lausanne in Switzerland and a visiting professor at Tel Aviv University in Israel.

== Education and career ==
Setter earned a master's degree in civil engineering in 1976, at the Technion – Israel Institute of Technology. She earned a Ph.D. in 1980 at Pennsylvania State University in the US, with a dissertation involving solid-state physics.

Next, she became a postdoctoral researcher at the University of Oxford in England and the University of Geneva in Switzerland. After working as a researcher in Haifa, she moved in 1989 to the École Polytechnique Fédérale de Lausanne. There, she became director of the Ceramics Laboratory, and in 1992 a full professor. She retired as a professor emeritus in 2016, and continues her research as a visiting professor in the Department of Materials Science and Engineering at Tel Aviv University.

== Recognition ==
Setter was appointed to the World Academy of Ceramics in 2006. She was named as an IEEE Fellow in 2007, "for contributions to field of ferroelectric materials, microsystems and microelectronics applications". She is a member of the Swiss Academy of Engineering Sciences.

She is the 2011 recipient of the W. R. Buessem Award of the Center for Dielectrics and Piezoelectrics at North Carolina State University, and of the 2011 achievement award of the IEEE Ultrasonics, Ferroelectrics, and Frequency Control Society, "for her outstanding research on the fundamentals of ferroelectric and dielectric materials, and their applications in novel devices". She was the 2013 Robert B. Sosman Award recipient and lecturer of the American Ceramic Society. In 2013 she also received the Excellence in Leadership Recognition award of the American Vacuum Society.

== Personal life ==
Setter is a double citizen of Switzerland and Israel.
