= Draga Gregorič Rosenberg =

Slovenian preschool teacher and kindergarten principal (1879–1965)

- Born: Draga Gregorič; March 2, 1879; Servola, Trieste, Austria-Hungary
- Died: March 28, 1965 (aged 86); Servola, Trieste, Italy
- Occupations: Preschool teacher, kindergarten principal
- Relatives: Marica Gregorič Stepančič (sister)

Draga Gregorič Rosenberg (2 March 1879 – 28 March 1965) was a Slovenian preschool teacher and kindergarten principal.

== Early life ==
Draga was born into a Slovene family on 2 March 1879 in Servola (Slovene: Škedenj), then part of Austria-Hungary. Her mother was washerwoman Marija Hrovatič and her father was butcher and farmer Mihael Gregorič. She had five siblings, three of whom, besides herself, also worked in education. Her elder sister was the teacher, writer and publicist Marica Gregorič Stepančič.

== Career and later life ==
In 1898 Draga founded a Slovenian kindergarten in Servola. It was the first kindergarten in the district. She served as its first teacher and headmistress. Until 1900 the kindergarten operated in her family home, after which it moved to premises of the Družba svetega Cirila in Metoda (Society of Saints Cyril and Methodius). She died on 28 March 1965 in Servola.
