= Dragana Branković Minčić =

Serbian politician

Dragana Branković Minčić (Serbian Cyrillic: Драгана Бранковић Минчић; born 1970) is a politician in Serbia. She was elected to the National Assembly of Serbia in the 2020 parliamentary election as a member of the Serbian Progressive Party.

== Private career ==
Branković Minčić lives in Zaječar. She has a Bachelor of Science degree and is the director of the pharmacy Zaječar.

== Politician ==
Branković Minčić received the seventy-fifth position on the Progressive Party's Aleksandar Vučić — For Our Children coalition list in the 2020 Serbian parliamentary election and was elected when the list won a landslide majority with 188 out of 250 mandates. She is now a member of the health and family committee and the committee on human and minority rights and gender equality, a deputy member of the committee on the rights of the child, the leader of Serbia's parliamentary friendship group with Equatorial Guinea, and a member of the parliamentary friendship groups with Cape Verde, Chile, China, Cuba, Cyprus, the Czech Republic, Greece, Japan, Morocco, Portugal, Russia, Spain, and Turkey.
