= Valentin Barišić =

Croatian football manager

Personal information
- Date of birth: 18 September 1964 (age 62)
- Place of birth: Požega, SFR Yugoslavia

Managerial career
- Years: Team
- 1992-1993: Prečko
- 1993-1995: Jarun
- 1995: Podsused
- 1995-1997: Lučko
- 1997-1998: NK Zagreb
- 2000-2001: NK ZET
- 2001-2007: Lučko
- 2011–2012: Vinogradar
- 2014: Segesta
- 2014–2016: Sesvete
- 2016: Lokomotiva

Valentin Barišić (born 18 September 1964) is a Croatian football manager.

He was appointed manager of Lokomotiva in June 2016.
