= Dragan Tešanović =

Serbian mixed martial arts fighter

- Born: Dragan Tešanović; September 2, 1985 (age 41)
- Other names: Gagi
- Nationality: Serbian
- Height: 6 ft 4 in (1.93 m)
- Weight: 185 lb (84 kg; 13.2 st)
- Division: Middleweight
- Reach: 192
- Fighting out of: Belgrade, Serbia
- Team: Car Dusan Silni
- Years active: 2007–2014

Mixed martial arts record
- Total: 11
- Wins: 9
- By knockout: 7
- By decision: 2
- Losses: 2
- By submission: 1
- By decision: 1

Other information
- Mixed martial arts record from Sherdog

Dragan Tešanović (Serbian Cyrillic: Драган Тешановић, born September 2, 1985) is a Serbian retired mixed martial arts (MMA) fighter who competes in the middleweight division. A professional MMA competitor since 2007, Tešanović mostly competed in the Eastern European circuit, before signing with the Bellator Fighting Championships.

== Mixed martial arts career ==
=== Background and early career ===
Tešanović is regarded as a well-rounded fighter, due to his "solid stand-up, great ground work and dangerous clinch game." Tešanović often utilises "soccer kicks" in fights, drawing on his footballing background.

In addition to his professional MMA career, Tešanović has placed first in five Serbian submission fighting competitions. He also holds a 5–1 record in amateur MMA and has been training since the age of 19.

In 2009, Tešanović was named as the sixth top prospect in Europe by Sherdog.

Tešanović's early career saw him compile a perfect 7–0 record, with three first round stoppages. Amongst this record was a decision victory over Antoni Chmielewski after dominating with knee strikes and effective takedown defence.

Tešanović was scheduled to make his English debut in December 2009 against Papy Abedi, though the fight never took place as Tešanović withdrew. His final appearance in his early career was against Gregor Herb. Tešanović won the fight via decision.

=== Bellator Fighting Championships ===
In August 2010, Tešanović signed with Bellator. Bellator CEO Bjorn Rebney stated that "Dragan Tešanović has tremendous potential to become a dominant middleweight" and that "his diverse training regime and quickly progressing skill-set set the table for him to make substantial impact in our 185 division".

Later, Tešanović signed to participate in his debut for the promotion. His opponent was named as Mike Bernhard, with the fight taking place at Bellator 34. Tešanović's previous seven fights have been held in Bulgaria, Serbia and Slovenia, making his Bellator 34 fight in Hollywood, Florida his North American debut. He lost the fight via unanimous decision (27–30, 28–29, 28–29).

== Mixed martial arts record ==
Professional record breakdown
11 matches	9 wins	2 losses
By knockout	7	0
By submission	0	1
By decision	2	1
Draws	0	

Res.	Record	Opponent	Method	Event	Date	Round	Time	Location	Notes
Win	8-2	(Italy) Matteo Minonzio	TKO (knee)	TFC - Tesla Fighting Championship 2	December 24, 2011	1	2:30	Belgrade, Serbia	
Loss	7-2	(Bulgaria) Svetoslav Savov	Submission (guillotine choke)	WFC 13 - Heavy Hitters	April 17, 2011	2	N/A	Belgrade, Serbia	
Loss	7-1	(United States) Mike Bernhard	Decision (unanimous)	Bellator 34	October 28, 2010	3	5:00	Hollywood, Florida, United States	
Win	7-0	(Germany) Gregor Herb	Decision (unanimous)	WFC 11 - Bash at the Beach	July 31, 2010	3	5:00	Portorož, Slovenia	
Win	6-0	(Austria) Markus Di Gallo	TKO (punch)	WFC 10 - Night of Champions	March 27, 2010	2	3:43	Ljubljana, Slovenia	
Win	5-0	(Slovakia) Matus Laincz	TKO (punches)	Ultra FC - Stop the Crime	October 31, 2009	2	4:31	Subotica, Serbia	
Win	4-0	(Poland) Antoni Chmielewski	Decision (unanimous)	WFC 6 - Relentless	September 27, 2008	3	5:00	Sofia, Bulgaria	
Win	3-0	(Serbia) Saša Mitrović	TKO (punches)	Memorijal Gidra Stojanović	April 6, 2008	1	N/A	Belgrade, Serbia	
Win	2-0	(Serbia) Mihaly Dobrai	TKO (punches)	Ultimate Fight - Čačak	December 1, 2007	1	N/A	Čačak, Serbia	
Win	1-0	(Serbia) Bojan Vojnović	TKO (punches)	Memorijal Gidra Stojanović	March 31, 2007	1	2:49	Belgrade, Serbia	

Except where otherwise indicated, details provided in the record box are taken from Sherdog.
