= Dragan Brljevic =

Croatian handball coach (born 1963)

Personal information
- Nationality: Croatian/Swedish
- Born: 26 October 1963 (age 62) Zagreb, Croatia
- Height: 1.93 m (6 ft 4 in)

Sport
- Sport: Handball
- Current club: Faroe Islands women (manager)

Dragan Brljevic (born 26 October 1963) is a Croatian-Swedish former handball player and current coach of the Faroe Islands women's national team. Between 2010 and 2020 he coached Lugi HF women's team. In May 2020, he was hired as new head coach responsible for both the men's and women's team of Kyndil in Tórshavn.

In October 2020, he was named head coach of the Faroese women's national team and coached them in the 2021 World Women's Handball Championship qualifying cycle phase 1.
