= Dragan Kamberov =

Macedonian basketball player

Blokotehna
- Position: Small forward
- League: Macedonian First League

Personal information
- Born: February 6, 1995 (age 31) Gevgelija, Macedonia
- Listed height: 6 ft 7 in (2.01 m)
- Listed weight: 224 lb (102 kg)

Career information
- Playing career: 2012–present

Career history
- 2012–2016: ABA Strumica / Strumica
- 2016–2017: Kožuv
- 2017–present: Blokotehna

Dragan Kamberov (born February 2, 1995) is a Macedonian professional basketball player who currently plays for Blokotehna.
