= Dragan Dragić =

Serbian politician

Dragan Dragić (Serbian Cyrillic: Драган Драгић; born 1980) is a politician in Serbia. He served in the Assembly of Vojvodina from 2016 to 2020 as a member of the Serbian Progressive Party.

== Private career ==
Dragić is an agricultural technician. He lives in Kovin.

== Politician ==
In September 2015, Dragić was appointed as an assistant to the mayor of Kovin with responsibility for economy, communal infrastructure, and urban affairs. He remained in this role until his election to the provincial assembly the following year.

Dragić was given the thirty-sixth position on the Progressive Party's electoral list in the 2016 Vojvodina provincial election and was elected when the list won a majority victory with sixty-three out of 120 mandates. He served in the assembly for the next four years and did not seek re-election in 2020.
