= Gana (outlaw) =

Nigerian criminal (c. 1970s – 2020)

- Born: Terwase Akwaza; 1970s Gbeji, Katsina Ala, Benue State.
- Died: 8 September 2020
- Cause of death: Gunshot wounds
- Other names: Gana, also spelt, Ghana
- Occupations: Thief, gang leader, outlaw, terrorist
- Criminal charges: massacre, kidnapping, assassination, robbery, cattle rustling, terrorism and murder
- Accomplices: Kumaor Fachii, Aondehemba a.k.a. Major, and over 200 others.

Terwase Akwaza (c. 1970s – 8 September 2020) also known as Gana (sometimes spelt Ghana) was a most wanted criminal and head of a militia in Benue State, Nigeria, whose activities peaked between 2015 and 2020. According to Murphy Ganagana and George Okoh, he was likened to the heroic outlaw, Robin Hood. He terrorized the Sankera geopolitical axis comprising Katsina Ala, Ukum, and Logo local governments' area, for more than a decade. Locals ascribed magical powers of disappearing and appearing to him and trembled at the mention of his name. Hated for his crimes, he positioned himself to be seen by the Tiv people as their defender against external aggression. He was loved by the people of his village, Gbeji, for providing them with basic amenities. Gana was accused of massacres, kidnappings, assassinations, robberies, cattle rustling, terrorism and murders. He levied farmers, traders, and prominent people. Resisting to pay brought death. His supremacy battle with former allies devastated several communities. A bounty of 50 million naira was placed on his head. Covert operations as well as air and ground offensives by the Nigeria Police and military to smoke out and arrest or kill him failed. He was murdered by the Nigerian Army after he turned himself in for amnesty on 8 September 2020.

== Early life ==
Terwase, literally meaning 'God help,' was born a native of Gbishe, Kpav District, Katsina-Ala local government area of Benue State. He lost his parents at a very young age. His father was a powerful witch-doctor (herbalist) who is said to have bequeathed him with magical powers. Some say his supernatural powers are derived from a shrine situated on top of a rock at the fringes of his village, Gbishe. Others believe his powers are from a ritual of black magic in which he killed and buried his 12-year-old daughter.

He began his life of crime between the ages of 10 and 12 stealing poultry products from his neighborhood, which he concealed inside the popular Nigerian Ghana Must Go bag. This earned him the nickname 'Gana' with the people of the locality. He grew famous for being a thief and began waylaying traders returning home on market days.

Later, Gana joined a militia group that defended his community against the regular Fulani herdsmen and Jukun militia attacks. His courageous streaks were admired by his people and chiefs. Some believe that after his contributions to several victories, witch doctors from his village decided to fortify him with fetish powers that protected him against weapons and bullets and enabled him to disappear.

He was a polygamist with more than 30 wives. According to his 33rd wife, Queen, any woman Gana touched ended up with him as a wife. In Queen's case, Gana touched her buttocks and she followed him and became his wife.

== Manhunt and amnesty ==
=== First amnesty ===
Gana lived in the jungle cohabiting with wild animals until Monday, 31 August 2015 when he first appeared in public to embrace the amnesty granted by Samuel Ortom, Governor of Benue State for criminals in the state. He led his gang of about 500 men to surrender to the amnesty program and submitted 84 rifles.

He was appointed chairman of the Joint Task Force on Revenue Collection in the state and attached with a team of security details made up of personnel of the Nigeria Security and Civil Defence Corps. His company, Ghatertex Nigeria Limited was also awarded a contract for the collection of Produce Tax for which he remitted 10 million naira monthly to the state government and retained the rest as running cost and settlement of his boys.

His freedom was, however, short-lived when he was accused of the murder of Denen Igbana, the Senior Special Assistant on Special Security to Gov. Ortom on 20 May 2016. He declined the invitation to the police for interrogation and returned to hiding. The state government withdrew the amnesty granted him and terminated his appointment as the chairman of the Joint Task Force on Revenue Collection and the contract awarded to his company, Ghatertex.

=== Manhunt ===
The organized search for Ghana began after he refused to turn himself in for interrogation on allegations of complicity in the murder of Denen Igbana, Senior Special Assistant on Special Security to the governor of Benue state. The state government withdrew his amnesty and placed an initial bounty of 10 million naira on his head and later raised it to 50 million naira.

In a manhunt that lasted for four years, covert operations as well as air and ground raids by the Nigeria police and military in a bid to smoke out and arrest or kill him failed. Both of the military's special operations, known as "Operation Ayem A Kpatuma" and "Operation Whirlstroke", were unsuccessful at pinning him down.

=== Second amnesty ===
Gana's return to his criminal activities was more disastrous than ever. Air and ground raids by the military, police and State Security Service neither tracked him down nor killed him.

As economic activities in the geopolitical axis were grounded, prominent indigenes, politicians, religious and traditional leaders requested and got acceptance for a second amnesty from the governor of Benue State, Samuel Ortom, on 4 September 2020, during a project commissioning and inspection of the area. The governor fixed 8 September 2020 as the day for the amnesty.

Gana and some of his boys turned up for the amnesty at the Emmanuel Akume Atongo Stadium in Katsina-Ala in full public glare to embrace the program. Some traditional rulers and public figures received him and headed for Makurdi, the Benue State capital where a meeting of the State Security Council was being held to formalize the amnesty.

The military, however, intercepted the convoy at Masaje, close to Yandev in Gboko local government where Gana was killed.

== Revelations according to Gana ==
While in hiding, Gana granted audience to Charles Eruka, a reporter with Channels TV, and also wrote a letter to the National Human Rights Commission (NHRC). In the Channels TV exclusive, he opened up on several of his activities in the underworld and accused top government functionaries of the Benue state government of having a hand in some crimes in the state.

In the interview, Gana revealed he was trained by the Fulani herdsmen in Niger, Sudan, and Cameroon and had on different occasions, alongside his gang fought as mercenaries for the Fulani herdsmen in their various conflicts in Nigeria. He alleged that the Fulani herdsmen planned to take over Plateau, Nasarawa, Benue, and Taraba states and contacted him to handle the Taraba axis of their invasion. The deal was, however, not sealed as he turned down their offer of three hundred and fifty million naira despite dropping his price to seven hundred and fifty million naira from an initial one billion naira asking price. According to him, he declined because the money was not enough to 'settle' the military formations in Taraba state so as to carry out a successful operation.

Gana denied having a hand in the murdered Senior Special Assistant on Special Security to Gov. Ortom, Denen Igbana. He accused the late Igbana of masterminding kidnappings in the state, citing two incidences: one in Gboko and another, the wife of a prominent Igbo businessman in Makurdi, popularly known as Officon. He alleged that the ransom of Officon’s wife was paid to the late Igbana, in which a dispute arose in the sharing formula between Denen and his boys. In both kidnappings, he contributed to efforts to apprehend the kidnappers who were later released by the police on the orders of Igbana.

In a letter to the Executive Secretary of the National Human Rights Commission dated 30 June 2016, Gana restated the allegations. He denied involvement in the murder of Denen Igbana and said he did not trust the police to be fair to him, which is why he went into hiding.

He also accused the Special Adviser to the Benue State governor on Security, Edwin Jando, a retired colonel of the Nigerian Army of gunrunning and a source of his ammunition.

== Atrocities ==
Gana was ruthless and cruel. On his orders, communities were dislodged and razed. Any challenge to his supreme reign of the underworld was met with death. His network was sophisticated and well organized, making him evade security agents. He disrupted socio-economic activities in the Sankera area.

He buried many alive and killed them at the slightest provocation. His 33rd wife, Queen, revealed that he killed the only daughter they had together and buried her in a shallow grave.

His murder victims include the District Head of Mbayongo, Chief Aloo Alev, and his counterpart in Michihe, Chief Chiahemba Livinus Shom, in Katsina-Ala Local Government Area as well as Chief Awua Alabar, District Head of Kundav in Ukum Local Government Area, who was gunned down in the presence of his family.

Gana was also responsible for the abduction and murder of the wife of Justice Tine Tur of the Court of Appeal, Esther Nguumbur Tur, and her companion, Mbalamen Kpensuen Aminde. The two were killed after the collection of ransom. The Hilux pickup in which they were abducted was also never found. The Appeal Court Justice did not survive the trauma of his wife's murder. He died shortly afterward.

On 20 March 2017, Gana and his gang raided Zaki Biam and killed about 17 people.

== Philanthropy ==
Gana built a clinic and science secondary school, named after him, in his village. He also gave out scholarships. Many beneficiaries of his scholarship are graduates.

He also gave out motorbikes, cars, grinding machines and business capital to some people in his community.
