= Dragana Potpara =

Serbian politician (born 1977)

Dragana Potpara (Serbian Cyrillic: Драгана Потпара; born 1977) is a politician and administrator in Serbia. She served in the Assembly of Vojvodina from 2016 to 2020 and is now a secretary of state in Serbia's ministry of public administration and local self-government. Potpara is a member of the Serbian Progressive Party.

== Early life and career ==
Potpara attained the title of master economist from a private university in Novi Sad. She has directed an environmental protection fund and was head of the municipal department of social activities in Kula, Vojvodina, where she resides.

== Politician ==
Potpara received the fifty-second position on the Progressive Party's electoral list in the 2016 Vojvodina provincial election and was elected when the list won a majority victory with sixty-three out of 120 mandates. She was a member of the committee on budget and finance and the committee on education and science. She did not seek re-election in 2020.

== Secretary of State ==
Potpara was appointed as a secretary of state in Serbia's department of public administration and local self-government in early 2021.
