= Dragana Milošević =

Serbian politician and musician

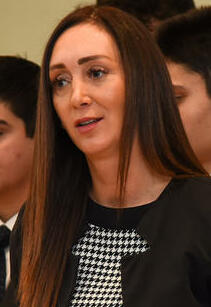

Dragana Milošević (Serbian Cyrillic: Драгана Милошевић; born 15 March 1983) is a politician and musician in Serbia. She has served in the government of Vojvodina since 2018 as secretary for culture, public information, and relations with religious communities.

== Early life and musical career ==
Milošević was born in Belgrade, in what was then the Socialist Republic of Serbia in the Socialist Federal Republic of Yugoslavia. She was raised in Vojvodina and graduated from the Academy of Arts in Novi Sad as a violinist. She is employed with the Opera of the Serbian National Theatre and is a permanent member of several orchestras, including the Vojvodina Symphony Orchestra, the Zrenjanin Philharmonic, and the Subotica Symphony Orchestra. She has participated in several concerts and festivals and has delivered many solo concert performances.

== Politician ==
=== Municipal politics ===
Milošević began her political career at the municipal level, appearing on the electoral list of the far-right Serbian Radical Party for the Novi Sad city assembly in the 2004 Serbian local elections. She was not initially given a mandate but entered the assembly later in the term as the replacement for another party member. She received the eleventh position on the party's list in the 2008 local elections and was given a second mandate when the list won twenty-six seats. (From 2000 to 2011, mandates in Serbian elections were awarded to successful parties and coalitions rather than individual candidates, and it was common practice for the mandates to be assigned out of numerical order. Milošević did not automatically receive a mandate by virtue of her list position, but she was given a seat in any event.)

The Radical Party experienced a serious split later in 2008, with several party members joining the more moderate Progressive Party under the leadership of Tomislav Nikolić and Aleksandar Vučić. Milošević sided with the Progressives. She did not seek re-election to the municipal assembly in 2012.

=== Provincial assembly ===
Serbia's electoral system was reformed in 2011, such that mandates were awarded in numerical order to candidates on successful lists. Milošević received the fifteenth position on the Progressive Party's coalition list in the 2012 Vojvodina provincial election and narrowly missed direct election when the list won fourteen mandates. She was able to enter the assembly on 8 November 2013 as the replacement for another party member. The 2012 election was won by the Democratic Party and its allies, and Milošević served in opposition during her first term.

She was promoted to the fourth position on the Progressive list in the 2016 provincial election and was re-elected when the list won a majority victory with sixty-three out of 120 seats. Milošević served as a member of the government's majority in the assembly until her appointment to the provincial executive.

=== Vojvodina government ===
Milošević was appointed to the Vojvodina government as secretary for culture, public information, and relations with religious communities on 6 March 2018. In a 2020 interview, she identified the construction of new buildings for Radio Television of Vojvodina and the National Theatre in Subotica, as well as reconstruction of the Museum for Contemporary Art of Vojvodina, as key accomplishments of the department during her tenure. She also drew attention to the centenary of the unification of the Serbian Orthodox Church, occurring later in the year.

She was re-appointed to her role in cabinet after the Progressive Party's victory in the 2020 provincial election.
