= Dragana Đorđević =

Serbian painter

Dragana Đorđević Драгана Ђорђевић
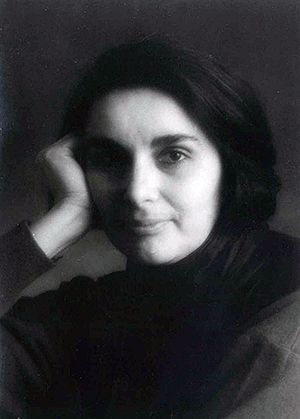
- Born: 18 March 1960 (age 65); Ćuprija, PR Serbia, FPR Yugoslavia
- Known for: Painting
- Movement: Eastern Orthodox Church Icons

Dragana Đorđević (born in 1960) is a Serbian painter who was trained in this traditional craft under the guidance of orthodox nun Porfirija. This Greek nun introduced her to the beauty of byzantine art toward which Dragana inclined ever since. During her over 30 years long career she has researched style of the great late byzantine masters whose monumental frescoes influenced and refined her own work. Her admiration toward Michael Astrapas and Eutychios or Panselinos encouraged her to mimic their styles in order to improve her own skill and only through that acquire particular trait of her art. Today she is praised as someone whose icons are of exceptional quality. Since 1988 Dragana has presented her icons on numerous exhibitions in Serbia and abroad and has participated in a number of art colonies, thus actively participating in defining development of contemporary religious art. She painted two icons of Serbian Patriarch Pavle who was considered saint by many in Serbia even before he deceased in 2009, and whose image is still very well-known. A few years after his death Dragana tried to incorporate his familiar facial features into the traditional technique of icon painting. In 1997 she also became a member of UPIDIV.

Dragana Đorđević has painted hundreds of icons, some of which were commissioned even for the monasteries and homes of the catholic Christians. Most of her works can be found in Serbia and Greece, but her icons can be also encountered in many other countries including Hungary, Italy, Bosnia, Croatia, Russia, Great Britain, America and Australia. Among Dragana’s most prominent art projects one can single out four mosaic icons commissioned for the monastery of the Holy Apostles near Thessaloniki and four iconostases (church of St. Paraskeva in Nea Kallikratia, church of St. Simeon in Veternik, church of Sts. Quriaqos and Julietta and a small chapel near Neos Marmaras).

When Dušan Milovanović was commenting on Serbian icon painters who according to his opinion are able to leave their mark on contemporary religious art, he included Dragana Đorđević in his list and noted that she "works lushly as Rublev".

== Selected exhibitions ==
1987, Vrsac, Review of the contemporary Serbian icon painting;
1993, Belgrade, Second exhibition of modern Serbian icon painting (National Museum in Belgrade)
1995, Belgrade, Contemporary Orthodox Serbian Art (Museum of Applied Art)
1998, Ljubostinja-Trstenik, Jefimija's days
2001, Belgrade, May Exhibition (Museum "May 25th")
2002, Belgrade, Orthodoxy and Creation (Djura Jaksic House)
2003, Sabac, Gallery of Vera Blagojevic
2005, Belgrade, May Exhibition (Museum "May 25th")
January 2006, Paris, exhibition organized by UNESCO
February 2006, Milan, Incontro delle culture: Icona - lo sguarrdo all'eternita (Future Art Galery)
May 2006, exhibition in Luxembourg
May 2008, Belgrade, Icon in 21st century (Progres Gallery)
2010, Stara Pazova, The icon painters of Vojvodina
2012, Belgrade, Icon exhibition "St. Maximus the Confessor" (Faculty of Orthodox Theology)

== Gallery ==
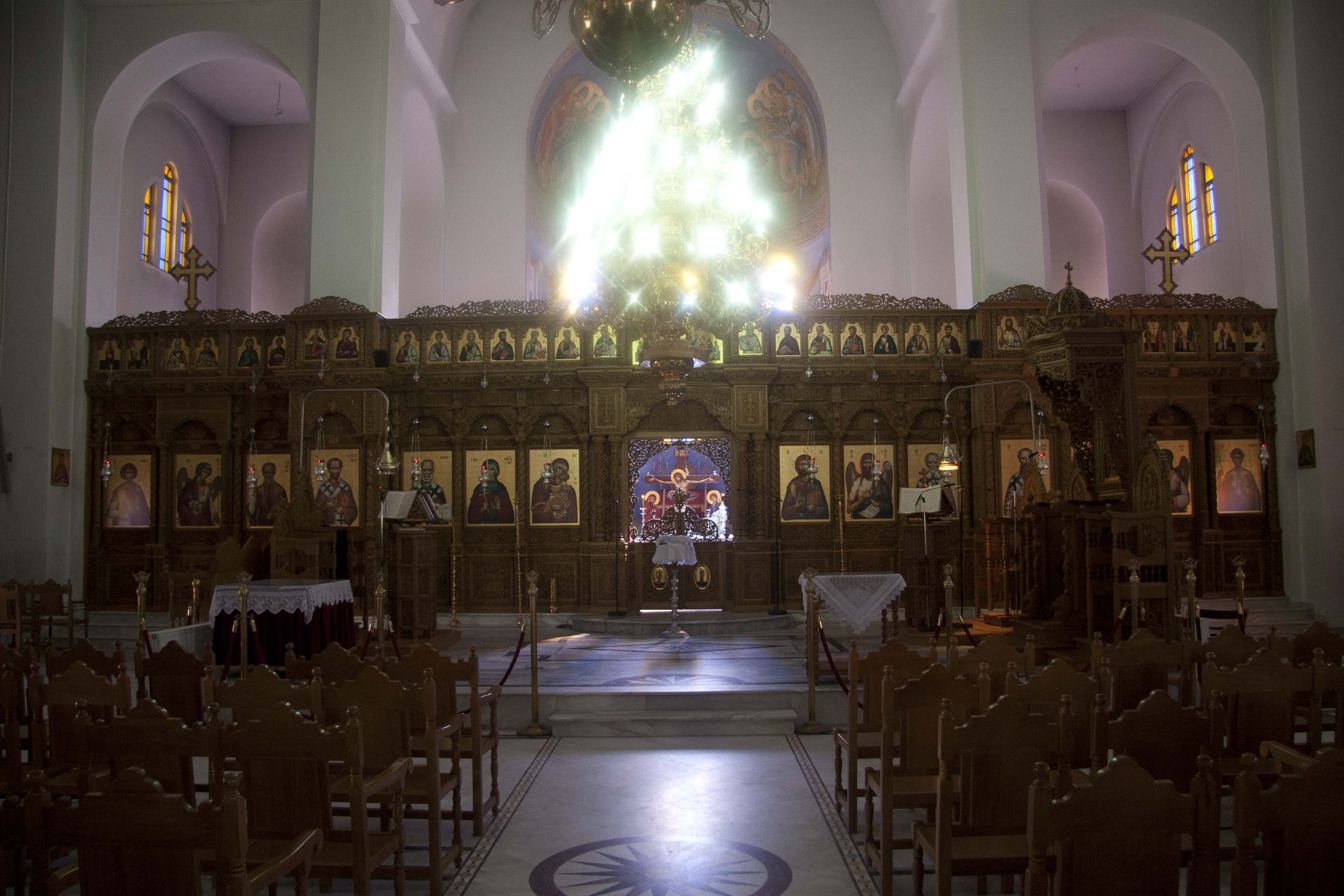
Iconostasis in Nea Kallikrateia, Greece. Church of St. Paraskeva. Icons are painted by Dragana Đorđević

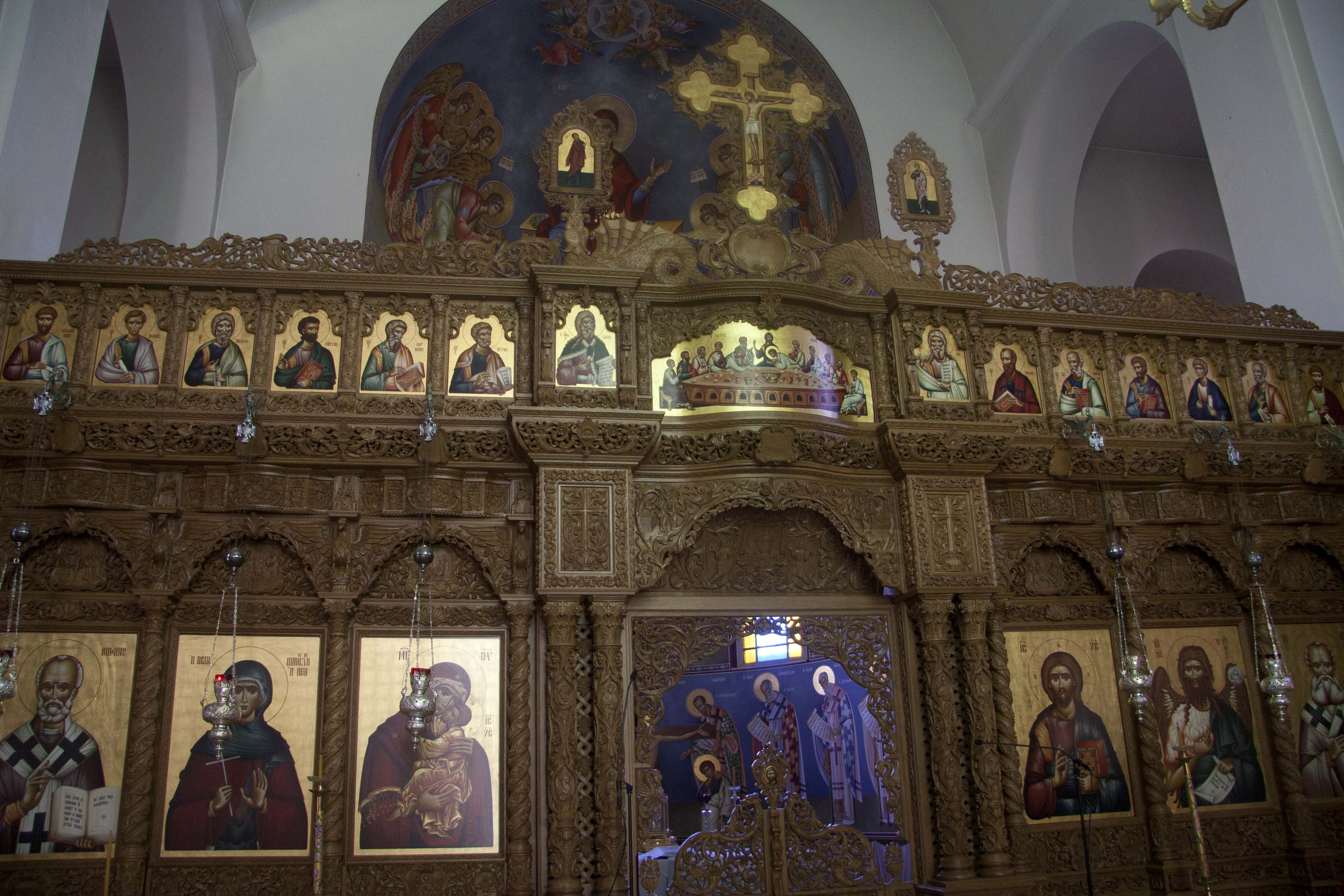
Iconostasis in Nea Kallikrateia, Greece. Church of St. Paraskeva. Icons are painted by Dragana Đorđević

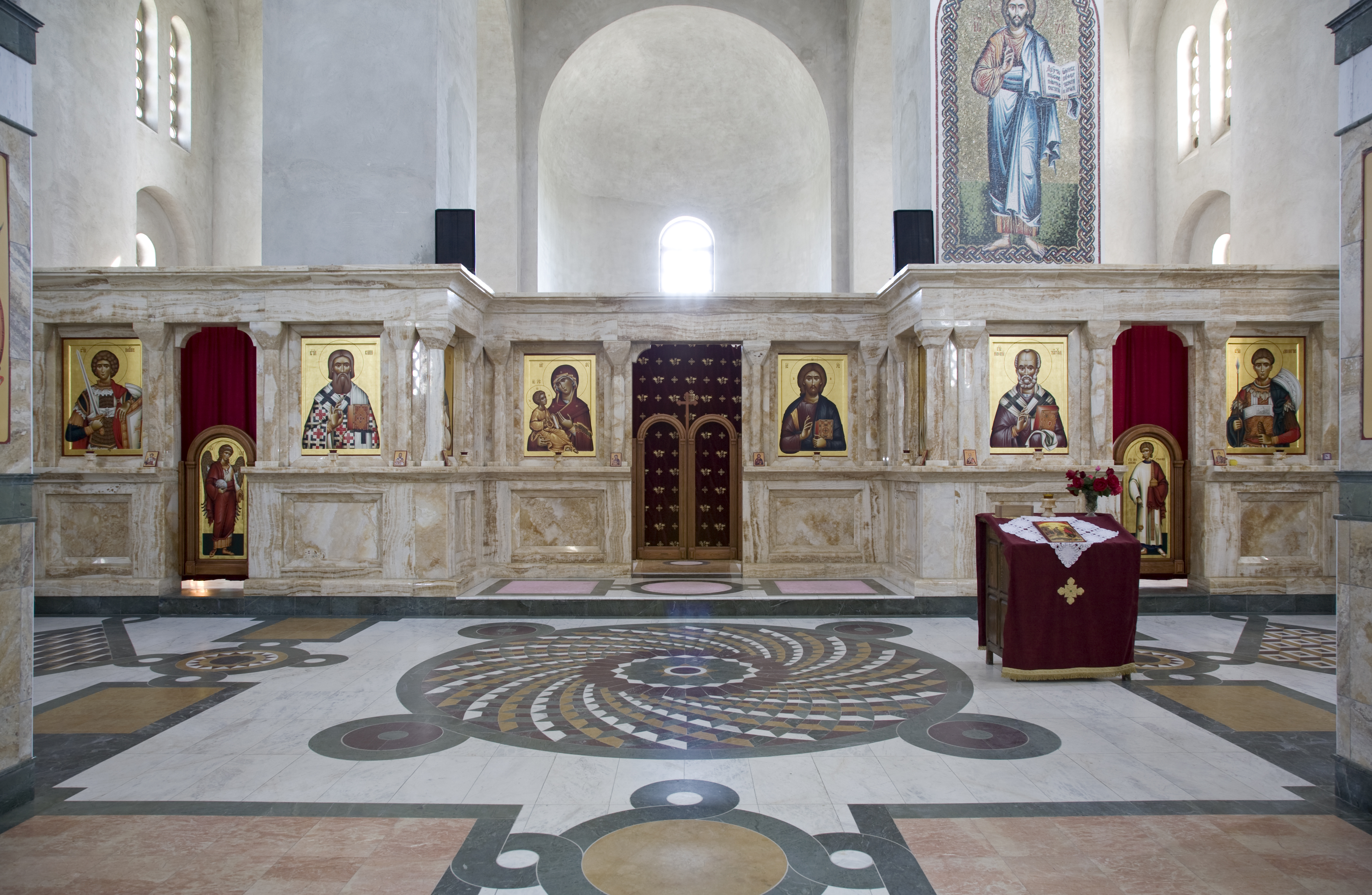
Iconostasis in Veternik, Serbia. Church of St. Simeon the Myrrh-flowing. Icons are painted by Dragana Đorđević

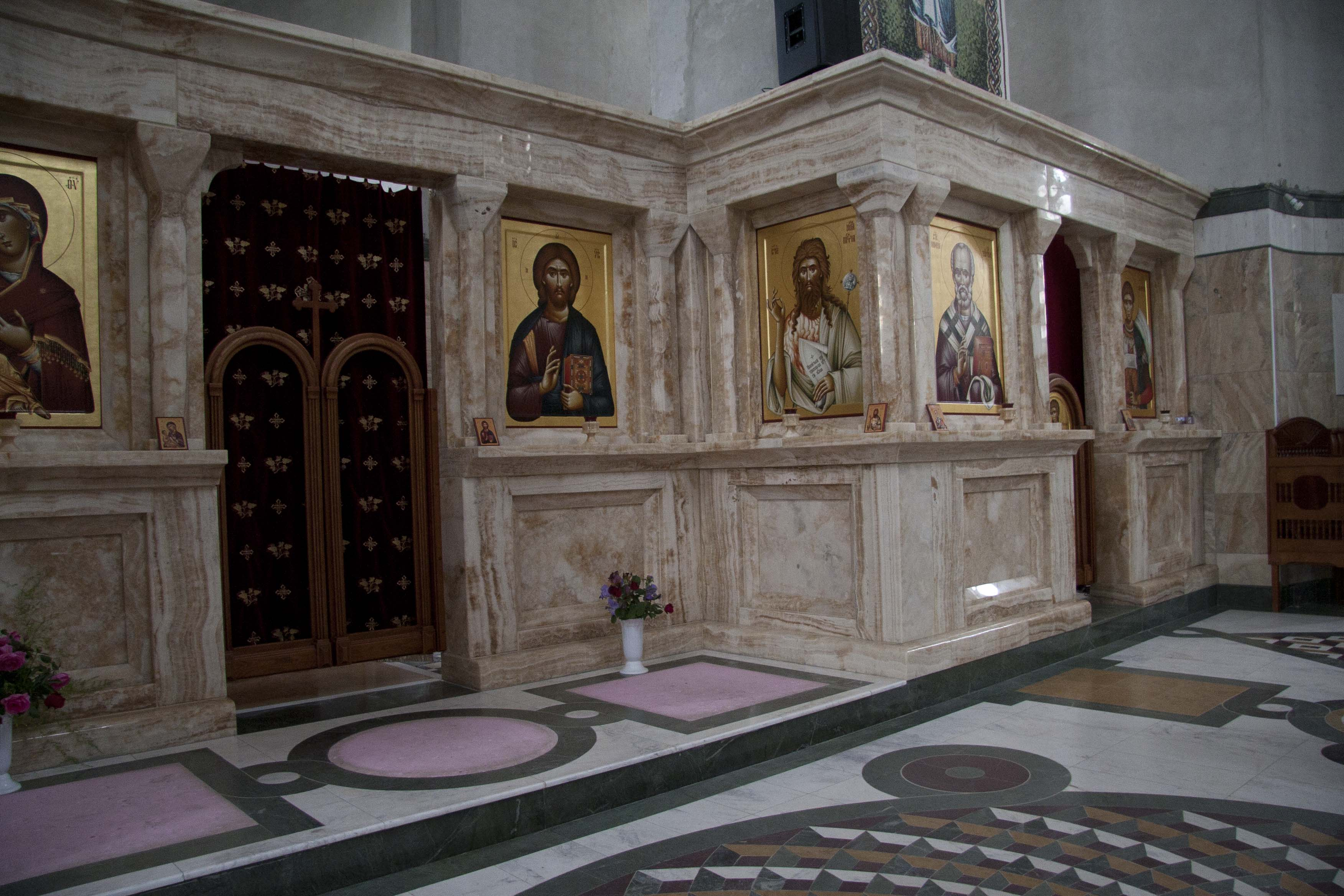
Iconostasis in Veternik, Serbia. Church of St. Simeon the Myrrh-flowing. Icons are painted by Dragana Đorđević

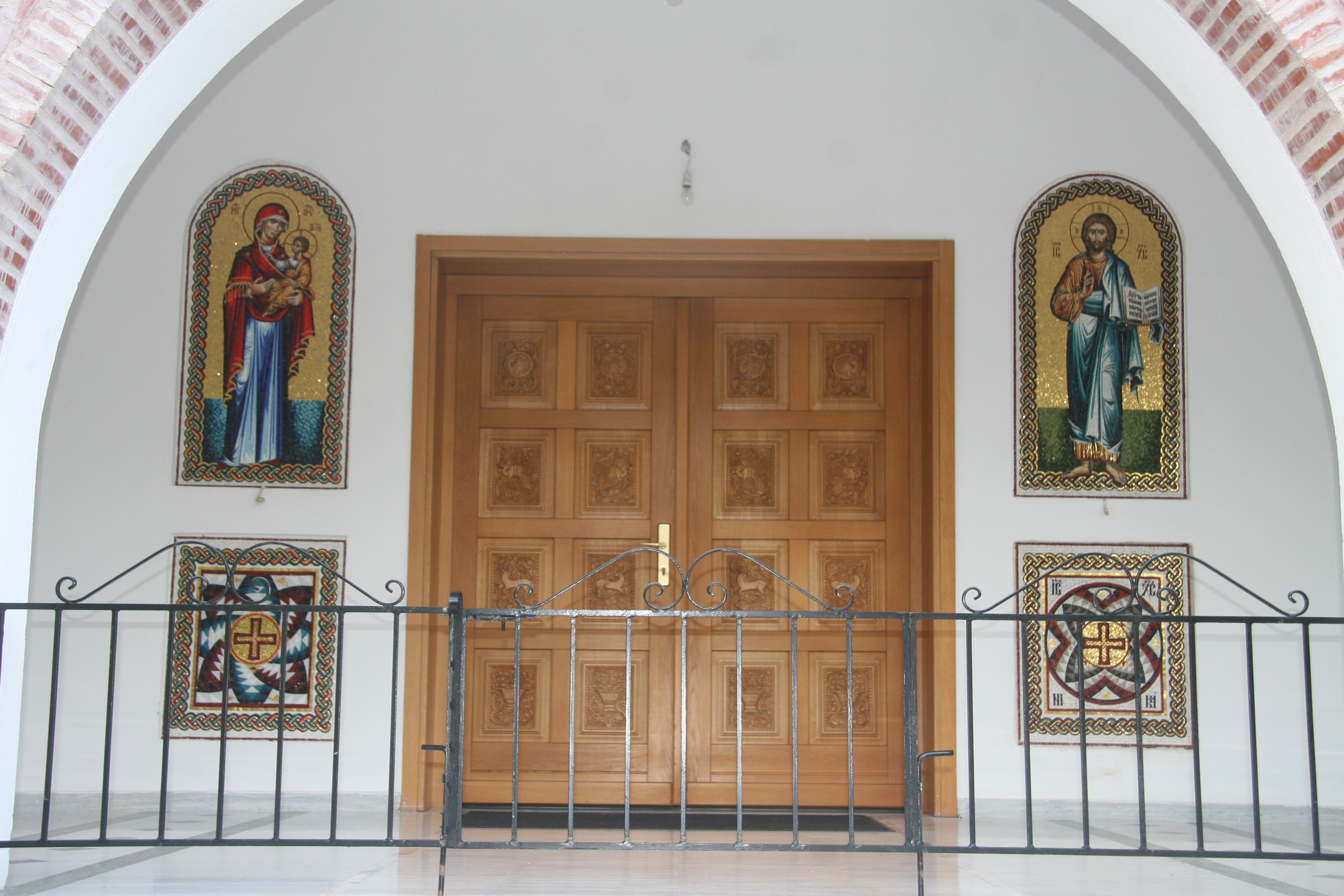
Monastery of the Holy Apostles near Thessaloniki. Church entrance. Mosaics are rendered by Dragana Đorđević
