= Dragan Gagić =

Serbian gymnast (born 1935)

- Драган Гагић
- Born: 9 December 1935 (age 90) Vinča, Kingdom of Yugoslavia
- Height: 1.72 m (5 ft 8 in)

Gymnastics career
- Discipline: Men's artistic gymnastics
- Country represented: (Socialist Federal Republic of Yugoslavia) Yugoslavia

Dragan Gagić (born 9 December 1935) is a Serbian gymnast. He competed in eight events at the 1960 Summer Olympics.
