= Dragoslav Ognjanović =

Serbian lawyer

- Драгослав Огњановић
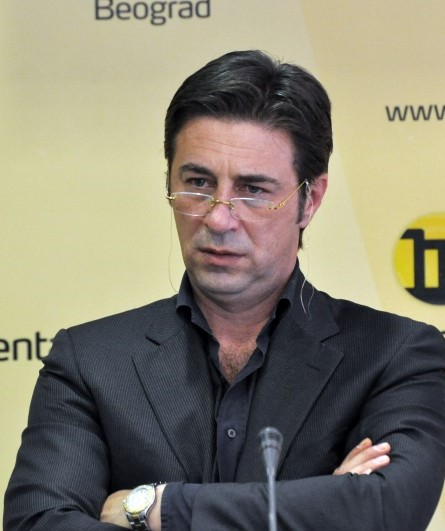
- Ognjanović in 2011
- Born: 21 December 1961; Belgrade, FPR Yugoslavia
- Died: 28 July 2018 (aged 56); Belgrade, Serbia
- Cause of death: Assassination
- Occupation: Lawyer

Dragoslav "Miša" Ognjanović (Serbian Cyrillic: Драгослав Миша Огњановић; 21 December 1961 – 28 July 2018) was a Serbian criminal lawyer. During his career, he was a participant in a large number of media-covered cases in Serbia.

== Biography and career ==
He was born on 21 December 1961 in Belgrade. He practiced law for almost 30 years, and was called the "Devil's Advocate". During his career, he defended a former Serbian President, Slobodan Miloševic for six years before the International Criminal Tribunal for the Former Yugoslavia, and was a representative of his wife, Mirjana Marković. In the case of the murder of Brice Taton he was one of the lawyers of Đorđe Prelic, the leader of the football fan group called Grobari, convicted for the murder of a French fan. In the last years of his career he was in the team of defense attorneys for Luka Bojović, a famous Serbian criminal, in proceedings before the courts in Belgrade and Spain. He was the candidate of the Socialist Party of Serbia for a member of the National Assembly, and in the 1990s he worked in the Third Department of the Belgrade Police, specializing in the investigation of murders in Belgrade.

== Personal life ==
He married three times. Ognjanović and his first wife, Ninoslava, had a son, Petar. He entered into a second marriage with a model, Natalija Mihić in 2007, with whom he had a son Mihajlo, and they divorced in 2014. Since 2017, he was married to a model, Sanja Papić, with whom he had a daughter, Lara.

== Assassination ==
Ognjanović was assassinated on 28 July 2018. He was shot and fatally wounded in New Belgrade in Antifašističke borbe Street, by unknown perpetrators. He was buried on 1 August 2018 at the New Cemetery in Belgrade.
