= Dragan Maksimović (academic) =

American engineering professor

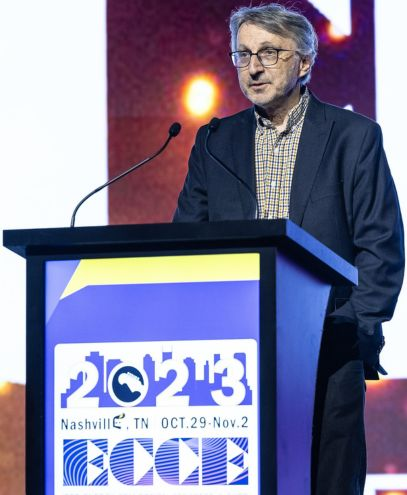
- Education: California Institute of Technology, University of Belgrade
- Known for: Power Electronics (Electrical Engineering)
- Awards: IEEE William E. Newell Power Electronics Award (2023), R. David Middlebrook Achievement Award (2022), IEEE Fellow (2015)

Dragan Maksimović is a Distinguished Professor at the Department of Electrical, Computer, and Energy Engineering, University of Colorado, Boulder. He is known for his research in the field of power electronics, more specifically in the digital control and modeling of switched-mode power supplies (SMPS).

== Education background ==
Maksimović received his B.S. and M.S. degrees from the University of Belgrade, Serbia, in 1984 and 1986, respectively, and earned a Ph.D. degree from the California Institute of Technology in 1989.

== Academic and research contributions ==
Maksimović has worked on fields within power electronics, such as PWM controllers, DC-DC converters, power-factor-correction rectifiers, and digital control, which has resulted in more than 45,000 citations as per Google Scholar (as of July 28, 2024), including publications in IEEE Transactions on Power Electronics.

He has co-authored a textbook titled "Fundamentals of Power Electronics," now in its 3rd edition, published by Springer in 2020, which has received more than 14,500 citations as per Google Scholar. He has also authored his second book, entitled "Digital Control of High-Frequency Switched-Mode Power Converters," published by Wiley-IEEE Press in 2015. He holds over 45 patents in the field of power electronics.

Apart from teaching at his university, Maksimović teaches Modeling and Control of Power Electronics Specialization on Coursera, which consists of five short courses entitled "Average-Switch Modeling and Simulation," "Techniques of Design-Oriented Analysis," "Input Filter Design," "Current-Mode Control," and "Modeling and Control of Single-Phase Rectifiers and Inverters."

== Awards and distinctions ==
Maksimović was a recipient of the National Science Foundation CAREER award in 1997. In 2012, the IEEE Power Electronics Society (PELS) awarded him the IEEE Modeling and Control Technical Achievement Award for his technical contributions to the advancement of power electronics in modeling and control.

In 2015, Maksimović was elevated to IEEE Fellow under the category "Research Engineer/Scientist" with the citation for the award mentioned as "For contribution to digital control of high-frequency switched-mode power converters." Seven years later, in 2022, he was awarded the PELS R. David Middlebrook Achievement Award for his contributions to the modeling and analysis of digitally controlled power converters. In the subsequent year (2023), Maksimović was awarded the IEEE William E. Newell Power Electronics Award for his work in "digital control, modeling and topologies of switched-mode power supplies."
