= Dragan Kruscić =

Serbian basketball player

Personal information
- Born: December 3, 1988 (age 37) Peć, SFR Yugoslavia
- Listed height: 1.97 m (6 ft 6 in)
- Listed weight: 98 kg (216 lb)

Career information
- NBA draft: 2010: undrafted
- Playing career: 2007–2016
- Position: Shooting guard

Career history
- 2007–2010: OKK Beograd
- 2010–2014: Metalac
- 2014–2015: Tamiš
- 2015: Sutjeska
- 2016: Tamiš

Dragan Kruscić (Serbian Cyrillic: Драган Крусцић; born December 3, 1986) is a Serbian professional basketball player Sutjeska.

== Playing career ==
A shooting guard, Kruscić played for OKK Beograd, Metalac, Tamiš, and a Montenegrin team Sutjeska.
