= Dragan Starčević =

Serbian footballer

Personal information
- Full name: Dragan Starčević
- Date of birth: 1 July 1977 (age 49)
- Place of birth: Loznica, SFR Yugoslavia
- Height: 1.89 m (6 ft 2 in)
- Position: Goalkeeper

Senior career*
Years	Team	Apps	(Gls)
2001–2005	Kneževac Kijevo	45	(0)
2005–2007	BSK Borča	67	(0)
2007	Drobeta-Turnu Severin		
2008	Laktaši	12	(0)
2008-2009	Borac Banja Luka	42	(0)
2010	Novi Pazar	9	(0)
2010–2011	Posavac		
2011–2012	Donji Srem	32	(0)
2013	Radnički Stobex		
2014	Donji Srem	0	(0)
2015	Sremac Vojka		
2015–2016	Donji Srem	11	(0)
2016–2017	Sopot	0	(0)
- * Club domestic league appearances and goals as of 2 August 2016

Dragan Starčević (Serbian Cyrillic: Драган Старчевић; born 1 July 1977) is a Serbian retired football goalkeeper.

== Career ==
Born in Loznica, Starčević played with Kneževac Kijevo, BSK Borča, Drobeta-Turnu Severin, Laktaši, Novi Pazar and Posavac before he joined Donji Srem. Playing for Donji Srem between 2011 and 2016, Starčević made 4 Serbian SuperLiga and almost 40 Serbian First League appearances. In the meantime, he was also playing with Radnički Stobex and Sremac Vojka. In summer 2016, Starčević moved to Sopot.
