= Dragoslav Jovanović (Serbian politician, born 1951) =

Dragoslav Jovanović (Serbian Cyrillic: Драгослав Јовановић; born 31 July 1951) is a politician in Serbia. He has served in the National Assembly of Serbia and the Assembly of Serbia and Montenegro as a member of the Democratic Party (Demokratska stranka, DS).

== Private career ==
Jovanović is a graduated agricultural engineer living in the municipality of Rekovac.

== Politician ==
=== Early years ===
Jovanović appeared in the fourteenth position on the DS's electoral list for the Kragujevac division in the 1993 Serbian parliamentary election. The list won three seats, and he was not given a mandate. (From 1992 to 2000, Serbia's electoral law stipulated that one-third of parliamentary mandates would be assigned to candidates on successful lists in numerical order, while the remaining two-thirds would be distributed amongst other candidates at the discretion of sponsoring parties or coalitions. Jovanović could have been awarded a position despite his low position on the list, but he was not.)

=== Municipal leader ===
The DS participated in the Democratic Opposition of Serbia (Demokratska opozicija Srbije, DOS) in 2000. DOS candidate Vojislav Koštunica defeated Slobodan Milošević in the 2000 Yugoslavian presidential election, a watershed moment in Serbian and Yugoslavian politics. The DOS also won control of several municipal assemblies in the concurrent 2000 Serbian local elections, including in Rekovac. Jovanović afterward became president of the municipality's executive board. The municipality's mayor, Pavle Mijajlović, was also a member of the DS.

As the leader of the executive board, Jovanović was involved in preparations for the six hundredth anniversary of the establishment of the Kalenić Monastery. At the time, he called for Kalenić to become a cultural centre of Serbia and for the spirit of its founders to lead to a spiritual renewal across the country.

Serbia briefly introduced the direct election of mayors in the 2004 local elections. Jovanović defeated Mijajlović for the DS's nomination; Mijajlović refused to accept the result, however, and started a rival political movement which contested the election in alliance with the Serbian Renewal Movement (Srpski pokret obnove, SPO). Mijajlović was ultimately re-elected to the position.

=== Parliamentarian ===
Serbia's electoral system was reformed in 2000, such that the entire country became a single division and all mandates were awarded to candidates on successful lists and the discretion of the sponsoring parties or coalitions, irrespective of numerical order. Jovanović appeared in the ninety-seventh position on the DS's list in the 2003 parliamentary election and was included in the party's assembly delegation when the list won thirty-seven mandates. He took his seat when the assembly convened in January 2004. Rekovac was one of the few Serbian municipalities where the DS won the popular vote in 2003; Jovanović credited the investments of the late Zoran Đinđić's government as leading to this outcome.

Jovanović's term in the republican parliament was brief. By virtue of its performance in the 2003 election, the DS had the right to appoint thirteen members to the federal assembly of Serbia and Montenegro. Jovanović was appointed to the federal body on 12 February 2004 and was required to resign his seat in the Serbian assembly. He served as a federal parliamentarian until 2006, when Montenegro declared independence and the state union came to an end.

Jovanović appeared in the eighty-ninth position on the DS's list in the 2007 Serbian parliamentary election. The list won sixty-four seats, and he was not on this occasion chosen for a mandate.

=== Since 2016 ===
Serbia's electoral laws were again changed in 2011, such that all mandates were awarded in numerical order to candidates on successful lists. Jovanović received the largely honorary 240th position (out of 246) on the DS's list in the 2016 parliamentary election. Election from this position was a mathematical impossibility, and indeed he was not elected when the list won only sixteen seats. He also received the second position on the DS's list for the Rekovac municipal assembly in the concurrent 2016 local elections and was re-elected when the list won two mandates. He served for the term that followed. The DS boycotted the 2020 Serbian local elections, and his term in office came to an end that year.

Jovanović remains active with the DS at the republic level and was elected to its main board in 2021.

== Electoral record ==
=== Municipal (Rekovac) ===
2004 Municipality of Rekovac local election: Mayor of Rekovac
Candidate	Party	First round		Second round	
Candidate	Party	Votes	%	Votes	%
Dr. Pavle Mijajlović (incumbent)	Coalition: Serbian Renewal Movement and Citizens' Group: For Levač (Affiliation: For Levač)			4,315	61.52
Dragoslav Jovanović	Democratic Party			2,699	38.48
Jagoš Kuburović	Serbian Radical Party				
other candidates					
Total				7,014	100.00
