= Dragoslav Jovanović (Serbian politician, born 1937) =

Serbian politician

Dragoslav Jovanović (Serbian Cyrillic: Драгослав Јовановић; born 22 February 1937) is a former politician in Serbia. He was a deputy prime minister in the Serbian government from 1993 to 1994, serving in the administration of Nikola Šainović. During his time in office, Jovanović was a member of the Socialist Party of Serbia (Socijalistička partija Srbije, SPS).

== Early life ==
Jovanović is from Požarevac in Central Serbia.

== Politician ==
The governing Socialist Party of Serbia won a plurality victory in the 1992 Serbian parliamentary election and formed a new administration in February 1993 with informal support from the far-right Serbian Radical Party (Srpska radikalna stranka, SRS). Jovanović was appointed as one of Serbia's five deputy prime ministers.

The SPS–SRS alliance broke down later in 1993, largely due to disagreements over support for Bosnian Serb forces in the Bosnian War. In October 1993, Jovanović was nominated to become governor of the National Bank of Yugoslavia; without the support of the Radicals, his nomination was defeated in the Yugoslavian parliament. This was one of a number of factors that led Serbian president Slobodan Milošević to dissolve the Serbian assembly and call new elections for late 1993.

In late 1993, Jovanović represented the Serbian government in meeting a delegation purporting to represent the Rothschild Group; the delegation was described as "examining the possibility of business cooperation in [Yugoslavia] after the lifting of sanctions." The delegation was later discovered to be fraudulent, and the Rothschild family clarified that they had nothing to do with the matter.

The SPS won an increased victory in the 1993 Serbian election, and a new ministry was formed in March 1994. Jovanović was not reappointed to the government. He was present at the founding convention of Mirjana Marković's Yugoslav Left (Jugoslovenska Levica, JUL) in 1994, although it is not clear if he joined the party.

In the late 1990s, an individual named Dragoslav Jovanović served as the Federal Republic of Yugoslavia's ambassador to the European Union. This may have been the same person.
