= Dragan Jovanović (Serbian politician, born 1960) =

Serbian politician

Dragan Jovanović (Serbian Cyrillic: Драган Јовановић; born 15 October 1960) is a Serbian politician. He served in the National Assembly of Serbia from 1991 to 1993 as a member of the Socialist Party of Serbia (Socijalistička partija Srbije, SPS). Jovanović later joined the Movement of Socialists (Pokret socijalista, PS).

== Early life and career ==
Jovanović was born in Aleksinac, in what was then the People's Republic of Serbia in the Federal People's Republic of Yugoslavia. He holds a Bachelor of Laws degree. He was president of the Socialist Youth Alliance of Aleksinac in the 1980s.

== Politician ==
Jovanović was elected to the national assembly for Aleksinac and Ražanj in the 1990 Serbian parliamentary election, the first to be held after the reintroduction of multi-party politics to Serbia. The Socialist Party won a majority government, and Jovanović served as a supporter of the administration. He did not seek re-election in 1992.

He later left the SPS and joined the breakaway Movement of Socialists, becoming secretary of the party's board in Aleksinac in 2014.

In 2015, he organized an event to commemorate Republic Day in the former Socialist Federal Republic of Yugoslavia.

== Electoral record ==
=== National Assembly of Serbia ===
1990 Serbian parliamentary election: Aleksinac and Ražanj
Candidate	Party
Dragan Milovanović (***WINNER***)	Socialist Party of Serbia
Živko Nikolić	Citizens' Group
Dr. Ljubinka Petrović	Serbian Renewal Movement
Miroljub Mikica Petrović	Citizens' Group
Časlav Radojković	Citizens' Group
Tatjana Tanja Samardžić	Citizens' Group
Dragomir Gana Smiljković	Democratic Party
Mladen Denča Tokić	Citizens' Group
Total
