= Dragan Jovanović (Serbian politician, born 1957) =

Serbian engineer and politician (born 1957)

Dragan S. Jovanović (Serbian Cyrillic: Драган С. Јовановић; born 28 February 1957) is a Serbian engineer, administrator, and politician. He served in the National Assembly of Serbia from 2004 to 2007 and was at different times the director of the TPP Nikola Tesla and TPP Kostolac energy plants. Jovanović is a member of the Socialist Party of Serbia (Socijalistička partija Srbije, SPS).

== Early life and private career ==
Jovanović was born in the municipality of Obrenovac in the city of Belgrade, in what was then the People's Republic of Serbia in the Federal People's Republic of Yugoslavia. He graduated from the Faculty of Mechanical Engineering in Belgrade and began working for Nikola Tesla in 1984.

== Politician ==
=== The Milošević Years (1992–2000) ===
During the 1990s, Serbian and Yugoslavian politics were dominated by the authoritarian rule of SPS leader Slobodan Milošević.

Jovanović was elected to the City Assembly of Belgrade for Obrenovac's fourth division in the May 1992 and December 1992 Serbian local elections. The SPS won majority victories in both elections, and he served as a supporter of the local administration. He was not re-elected in 1996.

Jovanović appeared in the fifth position on a combined list of the SPS, the Yugoslav Left (Jugoslovenska Levica, JUL), and New Democracy (Nova demokratija, ND) for the Čukarica division in the 1997 Serbian parliamentary election. The list won four seats, and he was not chosen for a mandate. (From 1992 to 2000, Serbia's electoral law stipulated that one-third of parliamentary mandates would be assigned to candidates from successful lists in numerical order, while the remaining two-thirds would be distributed amongst other candidates at the discretion of the sponsoring parties. Jovanović could have been given a mandate despite his list position, although in the event he was not.)

Slobodan Milošević was defeated in the 2000 Yugoslavian presidential election, a watershed moment in Serbian and Yugoslavian politics. Jovanović ran for the Yugoslavian parliament's Chamber of Citizens in the concurrent federal assembly vote, appearing in the fifth and final position on a combined SPS–JUL list in Čukarica. The list won two seats, and he was not assigned a mandate. He was also defeated for Obrenovac's second division in the concurrent 2000 Belgrade city election.

=== Since 2000 ===
Serbia's election laws were reformed in 2000, such that the entire country became a single electoral unit and all mandates were awarded to candidates on successful lists at the discretion of the sponsoring parties or coalitions, irrespective of numerical order. Jovanović was given the 102nd position on the SPS's (mostly alphabetical) list in the 2003 Serbian parliamentary election and was chosen for a mandate when the list won twenty-two seats. The Democratic Party of Serbia (Demokratska stranka Srbije, DSS) emerged as the dominant power in Serbia's coalition government after the election, and the SPS provided outside support to the administration in the assembly. Jovanović served on the committee for industry and the committee for science and technological development. He was also appointed to a special committee investigating practices at Elektroprivreda Srbije (EPS).

Jovanović received the 105th position on the SPS list in the 2007 parliamentary election. The party fell to sixteen seats, and he was not given a mandate for a second term. He also appeared on the SPS's electoral lists for the Belgrade city assembly in the 2004 and 2008 local elections, though he was not included in the party's delegation on either occasion.

Serbia's election laws were reformed again in 2011, such that all mandates were awarded in numerical order to candidates on successful lists. Jovanović appeared in the 148th position on the SPS's coalition list in the 2012 parliamentary election, the eighty-eighth position in 2014, and the sixty-fifth position in 2016. Election from any of these places would have been improbable, and indeed he was not elected when the coalition around the SPS won forty-four seats in 2012 and 2014 and twenty-nine in 2016.

In 2017, Jovanović became interim leader of the SPS's municipal board in Obrenovac.

== Energy sector administrator ==
Jovanović was appointed as director of Nikola Tesla in February 1997 and served in this role until January 2001. He was later accused of abuse of office in the position, specifically by illegally awarding apartments in Belgrade to power plant workers. Online accounts do not indicate how the matter was resolved. He worked in large investment projects with Nikola Tesla from 2001 to 2004 and held administrative positions at EPS after September 2004.

He was appointed deputy director of Kostolac in 2006 and promoted to director in 2009. In this role, he was active in negotiating a contract for large-scale investment with the Exim Bank of China. In December 2014, he announced that Serbia and China would soon sign a deal worth more than $600 million for investment in a new coal-fired power plant. He left Kostolac the following month, when he was appointed as an executive director of EPS.

In January 2022, he was awarded the Đorđe Stanojević honorary certificate and medallion from Elektroprivreda Srbije.

== Electoral record ==
=== Local (City of Belgrade) ===
2000 Belgrade city election: Obrenovac Division 2
Candidate	Party
Svetozar Dobrašinović (***WINNER***)	Democratic Opposition of Serbia–Dr. Vojislav Koštunica (Affiliation: Christian Democratic Party of Serbia)
Dragan Jovanović	Socialist Party of Serbia–Yugoslav Left–Slobodan Milošević (Affiliation: Socialist Party of Serbia)
Živanka Lazarević	Serbian Radical Party
Dr. Marica Lukić	Serbian Renewal Movement
Total

December 1992 Belgrade city election: Obrenovac Division 4
Candidate	Party
Dragan Jovanović (***WINNER***)	Socialist Party of Serbia
other candidates	
Total

May 1992 Belgrade city election: Obrenovac Division 4
Candidate	Party
Dragan Jovanović (***WINNER***)	Socialist Party of Serbia
other candidates	
Total
