= Dragana Barišić =

Serbian politician

Dragana Barišić (Serbian Cyrillic: Драгана Баришић; born 29 July 1975), formerly known as Dragana Mićić, is a politician in Serbia. She has served in the National Assembly of Serbia since 2014 as a member of the Serbian Progressive Party.

== Private career ==
Barišić lives in Kruševac. She is a psychiatrist in private life.

== Politician ==
=== Municipal politics ===
Barišić received the twelfth position on the electoral list of the far-right Serbian Radical Party for the Kruševac municipal assembly in the 2004 Serbian local elections. The list won eight mandates and she was not selected for a mandate. The Radical Party experienced a significant split in 2008, with several members joining the more moderate Progressive Party under the leadership of Tomislav Nikolić and Aleksandar Vučić. Barišić was among those who sided with the Progressives.

She was given the twenty-first position on the Progressive Party's list for Kruševac in the 2012 local elections. The list won eighteen mandates, and she was not initially elected. She was, however, awarded a mandate on 11 July 2012 as the replacement for another party member. During this time, she was the president of the city committee on gender equality. She resigned her mandate on 29 April 2014 after winning election to the national assembly.

=== Parliamentarian ===
Barišić received the eighty-seventh position on the Progressive Party's Aleksandar Vučić — Future We Believe In electoral list in the 2014 parliamentary election and was elected when the list won a majority victory with 158 out of 250 seats. She was promoted to the twenty-fourth position on the successor Aleksandar Vučić – Serbia Is Winning list for the 2016 election and was re-elected when the alliance won a second consecutive majority with 131 seats.

During the 2016–20 parliament, Barišić was a member of the assembly's health and family committee and the committee on administrative, budgetary, mandate, and immunity issues; a deputy member of the committee on constitutional and legal issues; the head of the parliamentary friendship group with Malta; and a member of the parliamentary friendship groups for Australia, Austria, Azerbaijan, Belarus, Bosnia and Herzegovina, China, Cyprus, the Czech Republic, Egypt, Greece, India, Italy, North Macedonia, Russia, Spain, Sweden, Tunisia, and Turkey.

She received the seventy-ninth position on the Progressive Party's Aleksandar Vučić — For Our Children coalition list in the 2020 Serbian parliamentary election and was elected on a third term when the list won a landslide majority with 188 mandates. She is still a member of the health and administrative committees and is a deputy member of the committee on the rights of the child, the head of Serbia's delegation to the parliamentary dimension of the Central European Initiative, the head of Serbia's parliamentary friendship group with Malta, and a member of the parliamentary friendship groups with Australia, Austria, Azerbaijan, Bosnia and Herzegovina, Brazil, China, Cuba, Cyprus, Egypt, France, Greece, India, Italy, Japan, Jordan, Kazakhstan, Morocco, North Macedonia, Portugal, Russia, Slovenia, Spain, the countries of Sub-Saharan Africa, Sweden, Tunisia, Turkey, the United Arab Emirates, and the United States of America.
