= Dragan Jovanović (Serbian politician, born 1946) =

Serbian politician

Dragan M. Jovanović (Serbian Cyrillic: Драган М. Јовановић; 31 March 1946 – 24 June 2015) was a Serbian politician. He was the mayor of Kruševac from 1993 to 1998 and served in the National Assembly of Serbia from 2001 to 2007. Jovanović was a member of the Socialist Party of Serbia (Socijalistička partija Srbije, SPS).

== Early life and private career ==
Jovanović was born in Belgrade, in what was then the People's Republic of Serbia in the Federal People's Republic of Yugoslavia. Raised in Kruševac, he graduated from the University of Belgrade Faculty of Mechanical Engineering and then worked at the Kruševac Higher School of Technology, serving as its director from 1977 to 1984. From 1984 to 1991, he was director of the Electronic Center in Kruševac, a pioneering organization in the field of information technology in Serbia.

== Politician ==
=== Municipal leader and deputy minister (1992–2000) ===
Online sources indicate that Jovanović was first elected to the Kruševac municipal assembly in 1991. He was re-elected as a Socialist Party candidate in the May 1992 Serbian local elections, the first to be held at the municipal level after the re-introduction of multi-party politics. The SPS won a landslide majority victory in Kruševac in this cycle with fifty-nine out of seventy seats, and Jovanović was chosen afterward as president of the assembly's executive committee. Following the December 1992 local elections, he became president of the assembly, a position that was at the time equivalent to mayor. Notwithstanding the sanctions against Yugoslavia, he oversaw a period of infrastructural expansion while in office, including construction of the FAM faculty in a new location. He also established a number of ties with sister cities, including Corfu in Greece. At one time, he convened an international meeting in Kruševac with representatives of fourteen cities; this was described as the largest international political gathering in the Federal Republic of Yugoslavia in the 1990s.

Jovanović appeared in the twenty-sixth position on the SPS's electoral list for the Kragujevac division in the 1993 Serbian parliamentary election. The list won twelve seats, and he was not given a mandate. (From 1992 to 2000, Serbia's electoral law stipulated that one-third of parliamentary mandates would be assigned to candidates on successful lists in numerical order, while the remaining two-thirds would be distributed amongst other candidates at the discretion of sponsoring parties or coalitions. Jovanović could have been awarded a mandate despite his low position on the list, although in the event he was not.)

The SPS won the 1996 local elections in Kruševac, despite a strong challenge from the Zajedno (English: Together) coalition. Jovanović was confirmed for another term as mayor and continued in this role until June 1998, when he was appointed as the deputy minister of industry in Serbia's government. Although relations between the SPS and Serbia's opposition parties were often fraught in this period, the local Zajedno organization in Kruševac generally had good relations with Jovanović across party lines.

During the 1990s, Serbian and Yugoslavian politics were dominated by the Socialist Party of Serbia under the authoritarian rule of Slobodan Milošević. Milošević was defeated in the 2000 Yugoslavian presidential election, a watershed moment in the country. Jovanović was personally re-elected to the Kruševac assembly in the concurrent 2000 Serbian local elections, although the Democratic Opposition of Serbia (Demokratska opozicija Srbije, DOS) won a majority victory in the municipality. The Serbian government fell after Milošević's defeat in the Yugoslavian election, and Jovanović's term as a deputy minister also came to an end.

=== Parliamentarian (2001–2007) ===
Serbia was briefly led by a transitional government after the fall of Milošević, and a new Serbian parliamentary election was called for December 2000. Serbia's election laws were changed prior to the vote, such that the entire country became a single electoral division and all mandates were awarded to candidates on successful lists at the discretion of the sponsoring parties or coalitions, irrespective of numerical order. Jovanović appeared in the eightieth position on the SPS's list – which was mostly alphabetical – and was given a mandate when the list won thirty-seven seats. The DOS won a landslide majority, and the Socialists served in opposition. In the assembly, Jovanović was a member of the industry committee.

Jovanović appeared in the 101st position on the SPS's list in the 2003 Serbian parliamentary election and was again chosen for a mandate after the list won twenty-two seats. The Democratic Party of Serbia (Demokratska stranka Srbije, DSS) emerged as the dominant power in Serbia's coalition government after the election, and the SPS provided outside support to the administration. In this term, he served on the industry committee and the committee for urban planning and construction.

For the 2007 parliamentary election, Jovanović was given the 106th position on the SPS list. The party fell to sixteen seats, and he was not chosen to serve for a third term.

=== Municipal politics from 2004 to 2012 ===
Jovanović led the SPS's list in Kruševac for the 2004 Serbian local elections and was re-elected to the municipal assembly when the list won ten seats.

He was given the seventeenth position on the SPS's list in the 2008 local elections. The list was seven seats, and the SPS afterward participated in the local coalition government. Jovanović was not given a seat in the assembly but was appointed to the city council (i.e., the executive branch of government) and served in this role for the next four years.

== Death ==
Jovanović died on 24 June 2015 after a short illness.
