= 1973 in association football =

The following events occurred in association football throughout the world in the year 1973.

== Events ==
- Copa Libertadores 1973: Won by Independiente after defeating Colo-Colo on an aggregate score of 2–1.
- Sunderland AFC wins the FA Cup final.
- May 31 – NAC Breda claims the KNVB Cup after defeating NEC, 2–0.

=== Europe vs South America FIFA charity match ===
31 October 1973

Europe XI	4–4	South America XI
Eusébio 14'; Keïta 22'; Asensi 51'; Jara 54'	Report	Sotil 13'; Cubillas 28'; Brindisi 64'; Chumpitaz 80' (pen.)
Penalties
Penalty missed Penalty scored	2–3	(penalty missed) Espárrago; (penalty scored) Borja; (penalty missed) Ortiz; (penalty scored) Morena; (penalty scored) Caszely

Camp Nou, Barcelona
Attendance: 28,000
Referee: Aurelio Angonese

== Winners club national championship ==
=== Asia ===
- Iran: Persepolis
- Qatar: Al-Esteqlal

=== Europe ===
- East Germany: Dynamo Dresden
- England: Liverpool
- France: Nantes
- Hungary: Újpest
- Italy: Juventus
- Netherlands: Ajax
- Poland: Stal Mielec
- Scotland: Celtic
- Soviet Union: Ararat Yerevan
- Spain: Atlético Madrid
- Turkey: Galatasaray
- West Germany: Bayern Munich
- (Socialist Federal Republic of Yugoslavia) Yugoslavia: Red Star Belgrade

=== North America ===
- Mexico: Cruz Azul
- United States / Canada:
  - Philadelphia Atoms (NASL)

=== South America ===
- Argentina
  - Huracán – Metropolitano
  - Rosario Central – Nacional
- Brazil: Palmeiras

== International tournaments ==
- 1973 British Home Championship (May 12–19, 1973)

England

== Births ==
- January 3 – Jaroslav Švach, Czech youth international (d. 2020)
- January 21 – Sergei Zhdanov, former Russian footballer
- January 30
  - René Gottwald, retired German footballer
  - Predrag Kodžo, Serbian footballer
- February 2 – Valeriy Yablochkin, Kazakhstani footballer
- February 10 – Ivan O'Konnel-Bronin, Estonian footballer
- February 18 – Markus Wanner, retired Swiss footballer
- February 23 – Alan Tutton, English former professional footballer
- February 24 – Ivan Gentizon, retired Swiss footballer
- March 7 – Ray Parlour, English footballer
- March 11 – Damián Álvarez, Mexican footballer
- March 16 – Bert Zuurman, Dutch footballer
- March 28 – Delmo (Delmo Arcângelo Coelho Monteiro), Brazilian former footballer
- April 4 – Peter Hoekstra, Dutch footballer
- April 6 – Sun Wen, Chinese footballer
- April 9 – Bart Goor, Belgian footballer
- April 10 – Roberto Carlos, Brazilian footballer
- April 12 – Roberto Ayala, Argentine footballer
- April 26 – Lee Woon-jae, South Korean footballer
- May 1 – Oliver Neuville, German footballer
- May 2 – Cristino Jara, Paraguayan footballer
- May 8 – Jesús Arellano, Mexican footballer
- June 18 – Lesmond Prinsen, Dutch footballer
- July 6 – Romuald Ardeois, French professional footballer
- July 13 – Roberto Martínez, Spanish football player and coach
- July 21 – Nelson Abeijón, Uruguayan footballer
- July 24 – Johan Micoud, French international footballer
- August 1 – Pierre Bastou, French professional football
- August 9 – Filippo Inzaghi, Italian international footballer
- August 14 – Jay-Jay Okocha, Nigerian international footballer
- August 14 – Jared Borgetti, Mexican footballer
- August 19 – Marco Materazzi, Italian international footballer
- August 26 – Heini Stocker, retired Liechtenstein footballer
- September 4 – Nandor Njergeš, retired Serbian footballer
- September 8 – Ángel Maldonado, Mexican footballer
- September 13 – Fabio Cannavaro, Italian international footballer
- September 18 – Limberg Méndez, Bolivian footballer
- September 21
  - Pedro Acevedo, former Chilean footballer
  - Max Eberl, German footballer
  - Oswaldo Sánchez, Mexican footballer
- September 23 – Raphaël Clapson, French professional footballer
- October 9
  - Thomas Frank, Danish football player and manager
  - Carlos Pavón, Honduran international footballer
- October 11 – Steven Pressley, Scottish footballer
- October 14 – Fabián O'Neill, Uruguayan international footballer (died 2022)
- October 20 – Lim Gi-han, coach and former South Korean footballer
- October 24 – Glenn Summerville, Dutch footballer
- October 29 – Robert Pires, French international footballer
- November 17
  - Bernd Schneider, German international footballer
- November 27 – Stephen Pugh, Welsh former professional footballer
- November 29 – Ryan Giggs, Welsh footballer
- December 5 – Andrei Krasnopjorov, Estonian footballer
- December 6 – Petar Miloševski, Macedonian international footballer (died 2014)
- December 11 – Ray Kenny, Irish footballer
- December 12 – Walter Otta, Argentinian footballer
- December 27 – Ivica Vulić, Slovenian retired international footballer
- December 31 – Paweł Bugała, Polish former professional footballer

== Deaths ==
=== March ===
- March 19 – Hans Stubb (66), German footballer (born 1906)
- March 29– Adolfo Zumelzú, Argentine defender, runner-up of the 1930 FIFA World Cup. (71)

=== April ===
- April 21 – Evert Jan Bulder (78), Dutch footballer (born 1894)

=== September ===
- September 15 – Washington Ortuño, Uruguayan midfielder, winner of the 1950 FIFA World Cup (46)

=== November ===
- November 16 – Lorenzo Fernández, Uruguayan defender, winner of the 1930 FIFA World Cup. (73)
