= Predrag =

- Pronunciation: [prêdraːɡ]
- Gender: male
- Language: Slavic

Origin
- Origin: pre- ("very, much") + drag ("dear, beloved")
- Meaning: "Very beloved"
- Region of origin: Eastern Europe

Other names
- Alternative spelling: Предраг
- Nickname: Peđa
- Related names: Dragan, Miodrag

Predrag (Serbian Cyrillic: Предраг) is a Slavic masculine given name, predominantly borne by ethnic Slavs, derived from pre- ("very, much") and -drag ("dear, beloved"), both common in Slavic dithematic names. It roughly means "very beloved". The usual nickname is Peđa (Pedja).

== Notable people with the name ==
=== A-J ===
- Predrag Alempijević (born 1970), Serbian footballer
- Predrag Antonijević (born 1959), Serbian director and screenwriter
- Predrag Azdejković (born 1978), Serbian activist, journalist, writer
- Predrag Balašević (born 1974), Serbian-Romanian politician
- Predrag Bambić (born 1958), Serbian film and television cinematographer
- Predrag Banović (born 1969), Bosnian Serb war criminal
- Predrag Benaček (born1959), Bosnian basketball coach
- Predrag Bjelac (born 1962), Serbian actor
- Predrag Bobić (born 1960), Croatian musician, guitarist and music pedagogue
- Predrag Bogosavljev (born, 1959), Serbian basketball executive
- Predrag Bošković (born 1972). Montenegrin politician and sports administrator
- Predrag "Pedj" Bojić (born 1984). Australian soccer player
- Predrag Bošnjak (born 1985). Hungarian footballer
- Predrag Brzaković (1964–2012), Serbian footballer
- Predrag Bubalo (born 1954). Serbian politician
- Predrag Bulatović (born 1956). Montenegrin politician
- Predrag Cvetanović (born 1967), Serbian politician
- Predrag Cvitanović (born 1946), Croatian physicist and academic
- Predrag Đajić (1922–1979), Yugoslav footballer
- Predrag Danilović (born 1970), Serbian basketball player
- Predrag Đorđević (born 1972), Serbian footballer
- Predrag Đorović (born 1983), Serbian footballer
- Predrag Dragić (1945–2012), Serbian humanist and writer
- Predrag Drobnjak (born 1975), Montenegrin basketball player
- Predrag Ejdus (1947–2018), Serbian actor
- Predrag Erak (born 1970), Bosnian football player and manager
- Predrag Filipov (born 1956), Serbian doctor of medical sciences, politician and diplomat
- Predrag Filipović (footballer) (born 1975), Montenegrin footballer
- Predrag Filipović (racewalker) (born 1978), Serbian racewalker
- Predrag Finci (born 1946), Bosnian–British philosopher, author, and essayist
- Predrag Ginculj (born 1983), Serbian politician
- Predrag Gojković Cune (1932–2017), Serbian vocalist and recording artist
- Predrag Golubović (1935–1994), Serbian film director and screenwriter
- Predrag Gosta (born 1972), Serbian-American conductor and musician
- Predrag Govedarica (born 1984), Serbian footballer
- Predrag "Peđa" Grbin (born 1979), Croatian lawyer and politician
- Predrag Jaćimović (born 1957), Serbian basketball coach
- Predrag Jelenković (born 1965), Serbian politician
- Predrag Jeremić (born 1987), Serbian footballer
- Predrag Jokanović (born 1968), Serbian footballer
- Predrag Jokić (born 1983), Montenegrin water polo player
- Predrag Joksimović (born 1977), former Serbian basketball player
- Predrag "Peđa D'Boy" Jovanović (born 1950), Serbian musician
- Predrag Jovanović (footballer) (born 1965), Serbian footballer
- Predrag Jović (born 1987), Serbian footballer
- Predrag Jurić (born 1961), Bosnian footballer

=== K-P ===
- Predrag Kašćelan (born 1990), Montenegrin footballer
- Predrag Keros (1933–2018), Croatian doctor and professor
- Predrag Kodžo (born 1973), Serbian footballer
- Predrag Kojović (born 1965), Bosnian Serb politician
- Predrag Koraksić Corax (born 1933), Serbian political caricaturist
- Predrag Kovačević, Bosnian guitarist
- Predrag Krunić (born 1967), Bosnian basketball coach
- Predrag Laković (1929–1997), Serbian actor
- Predrag Lazić (born 1982), Serbian footballer
- Predrag Luka (born 1988), Serbian footballer
- Predrag "Miki" Manojlovic (born 1950), Serbian actor
- Predrag Manojlović (water polo) (1951–2014), Yugoslav water polo player
- Predrag Marković (born 1955), Serbian politician, author, and historian
- Predrag J. Marković (born 1965), Serbian politician and historian
- Predrag Marsenić (born 1970), Serbian engineer and politician
- Predrag Materić (born 1977), Serbian–French basketball player and sports agent
- Predrag Matić (1962–2024), Croatian politician
- Predrag Matvejević (1932–2017), Yugoslav writer and scholar
- Predrag Mihailović (born 1974), Australian water polo coach
- Predrag Mijatović (born 1969), Montenegrin football player
- Predrag Mijić (footballer) (born 1984), Serbian footballer
- Predrag Miletić (born 1952), Serbian actor
- Predrag Miletić (basketball) (born 1984), Serbian basketball player
- Predrag Milinković (1933–1998), Serbian actor
- Predrag Milićević Barbarien (1963–2013), Serbian painter
- Predrag Milosavljević (1908—1989), Serbian painter
- Predrag Miloš (born 1955), Serbian swimmer
- Predrag Milošević (composer) (1904–1988), Serbian composer and conductor
- Predrag Mirčeta (born 1984), Serbian footballer
- Predrag Mitić (born 1969), Serbian footballer
- Predrag Momirović (born 1977), Serbian sprinter
- Predrag Mužijević, Bosnian pianist
- Predrag K. Nikić, Serbian Yoga teacher
- Predrag Nikolić (born 1960), Bosnian Serb chess grandmaster
- Predrag Nikolić (director) (born 1962), Serbian director, screenwriter and media advisor
- Predrag Ocokoljić (born 1977), Serbian footballer
- Predrag Ostojić (1938–1996), Yugoslav chess player
- Predrag Pajdic (born 1965), Serbian-British artist, art historian and curator
- Predrag Pajić (born 1993), Macedonian basketball player
- Predrag Palavestra (1930–2014), Yugoslav author, literary historian and academic
- Predrag Papaz (born 1987), Bosnian footballer
- Predrag Patić (born 1967), Serbian politician
- Predrag Pavlović (born 1986), Serbian footballer
- Predrag Pašić (born 1958), Bosnian footballer
- Predrag Pažin (born 1973), Bulgarian footballer
- Predrag Peruničić (born 1967), Serbian handball player
- Predrag Počuča (born 1986), Croatian-Serbian footballer
- Predrag Puharić (born 1977), Bosnian computer security expert and politician

=== R-Z ===
- Predrag "Preki" Radosavljević (born 1963), Serbian-American soccer player and coach
- Predrag Radovanović (1911–1964), Serbian footballer
- Predrag Radošević, Montenegrin boxer
- Predrag Rajić (born 1987), Serbian politician
- Predrag Rajković (born 1995), Serbian footballer
- Predrag Rakić, Bosnian drummer and music manager
- Predrag Raković (1912–1944), Yugoslav military officer
- Predrag Ranđelović (footballer, born 1976), Serbian footballer
- Predrag Ranđelović (footballer, born 1990), Macedonian footballer
- Predrag Ristanović (born 1972), Serbian football player and manager
- Predrag Ristić (1931–2019), Serbian architect and university professor
- Predrag Ristović (born 1975), Serbian footballer
- Predrag Rogan (born 1974), Serbian football manager and former player
- Predrag Rusevski (born 1983), Macedonian tennis player
- Predrag Samardžiski (born 1986), Macedonian basketball player
- Predrag Sarić (1921–1979), Croatian rower
- Predrag Šarić (born 1959), Croatian basketball player
- Predrag Savović (born 1976), Montenegrin basketball player
- Predrag Sikimić (born 1982), Serbian footballer
- Predrag Šimić (born 1979), Bosnian footballer
- Predrag Spasić (born 1965), Serbian footballer
- Predrag Stamenković (born 1977), Serbian footballer
- Predrag Stanimirović (born 1995), Serbian footballer
- Predrag Stanković (born 1968), Serbian footballer
- Predrag Stevanović (born 1991), Serbian footballer
- Predrag Stilinović (born 1954), Croatian football manager
- Predrag Stipanović (born 1964), Croatian military officer
- Predrag Stojaković (born 1977), Serbian basketball player
- Predrag Stojanović (born 1958), Serbian academic and politician
- Predrag Štromar (born 1969), Croatian politician
- Predrag Šuput (born 1977), Serbian basketball player
- Predrag Šustar (born 1970), Croatian philosophy professor and politician
- Predrag Tasovac (1922–2010), Serbian actor
- Predrag Timko (born 1948), Yugoslav handball player
- Predrag Tomić (born 1953), Serbian footballer
- Predrag Umičević (born 1963), Serbian engineer and politician
- Predrag Valenčić (born 1963), Croatian footballer
- Predrag Vejin (born 1992), Serbian handball player
- Predrag Vranicki (1922–2002), Yugoslav philosopher
- Predrag Vujović (born 1983), Montenegrin footballer
- Predrag Vuković (born 1966), Serbian politician
- Predrag Vušović (1960–2011), Croatian actor
- Predrag Zimonjić (born 1970), Serbian water polo player
- Predrag Živadinović (born 1983), Serbian footballer
- Predrag Živković Tozovac (1936–2021), Serbian folk singer and composer
