= List of fan-owned sports teams =

This list of fan-owned sports teams includes professional and semi-professional teams solely owned by fans/supporters, either via a collective organisation or where the assumption of majority ownership by a small group is prohibited by the club's constitution or governing documents. In some cases, the line is blurry between these teams and teams whose ownership is publicly traded. Teams playing at every level in each country are shown, and are sorted by home country.

== Association football ==
=== Argentina ===
All association football clubs in Argentina are owned by their members. Every club is organised as not-for-profit organization according to Argentinian law (asociación civil sin fines de lucro).

There are a few privately owned teams such as Crucero del Norte.

=== Australia ===
- Melbourne Knights
- South Melbourne
- Preston Lions

=== Austria ===
- FC Pinzgau Saalfelden, a fan-owned club that is owned, in majority, by fans who have invested into the club through the American company Fan Owned Club.

==== Protest Clubs ====
- SV Austria Salzburg – Founded in 2005 by supporters of the original SV (Austria) Salzburg in protest against the takeover and rebranding of the club by Red Bull GmbH.

==== Phoenix Clubs ====
- FC Blau-Weiß Linz – Club was founded in 1997 and adopted the traditions of the defunct club FC Linz, which due to financial difficulties had to finally dissolve, by merger with their long-time rivals LASK Linz.
- Grazer Athletiksport Klub – was refounded in 2012 as Grazer AC after the former Grazer AK was dissolved. On 14 March 2014 Grazer AC was considered to be a continuation of the original "GAK" in agreement with its umbrella association.

==== Clubs controlled by their members ====
- First Vienna FC 1894
- SK Rapid Wien
- SK Sturm Graz
- Wiener Sport-Club
- SV Ried

=== Belarus ===
- FC Torpedo Minsk
- FC Partizan Minsk
- FC Krumkachy Minsk

=== Belgium ===
- KSK Beveren
- K. Lyra-Lierse

=== Bosnia and Herzegovina ===
All football clubs in Bosnia and Herzegovina are registered as not-for-profit associations of citizens. However, in practice, only one club allows its members to democratically participate and vote in its General Assembly.

- NK Čelik Zenica – member-run since 2017

=== Brazil ===
Although since 1993 Brazilian law allows for privately owned sport clubs, most of the hundreds of professional association football clubs in Brazil are owned by their members as not-for-profit organizations. These include many of the traditionally considered 12 major clubs in the country:

- Corinthians
- Flamengo
- Fluminense
- Grêmio
- Internacional
- Palmeiras
- Santos
- São Paulo

=== Canada ===
- TSS FC Rovers – Minority fan-owned. Fan input is formally organized through the Spirit of the Rovers supporters' trust.
- Valour FC – Began play in 2019 as a charter member of the Canadian Premier League. Indirectly a fan-owned club; owned by the Winnipeg Blue Bombers, a Canadian football team.
- Victoria Highlanders F.C. – majority owner Alex Campbell Jr. publicly announced that the purchase of season tickets will give supporters "an ownership share in the club and a voice in its direction". Season ticket holders are members of the Victoria Highlanders Supporters Society, which owned 30% of the club and held two seats (of nine) on the club's advisory board. The club however disbanded in 2014 and when it was re-founded a year later in 2015, it did not involve fan-ownership.

=== Chile ===
- Curicó Unido
- Cobresal

=== Costa Rica ===
- L.D. Alajuelense

=== Colombia ===
- Deportivo Cali

=== Croatia ===
- GNK Dinamo Zagreb
- HNK Hajduk Split – Fan association Naš Hajduk (Our Hajduk) owns 30.60% of the club shares. That enables fans to control and preserve historic symbols like club name, hometown, crest etc. It also enables the association an inside view of the functioning of the club. In accordance with the city of Split which owns 65.92% of the club shares, Naš Hajduk organizes democratic elections for the club's supervisory board. All active members can participate. Naš Hajduk has had over 90.000 yearly active members in the past two years. On top of shares owned by Naš Hajduk, more shares are also owned by the individual fans.
- HNK Trogir – Club owned since 2009.

==== Protest clubs ====
- NK Varteks – founded in 2011 by disgruntled supporters of NK Varaždin, whose financial situation had caused it to be suspended by the Croatian Football Federation
- NK Zagreb 041 – founded in 2014 as fans were dissatisfied with the situation in NK Zagreb.

=== Cyprus ===
==== Protest clubs & clubs controlled by their members ====
- PAC Omonia 29M – PAC Omonia was founded by fans of Cypriot club AC Omonia & Gate 9, following the undemocratic decision to privatise it. PAC Omonia is a supporter-owned football club that continues the tradition and essence of Omonia as a democratic one-member, one-vote organisation and as a social organisation that cares about its community.

=== Czech Republic ===
==== Minority supporter owned ====
- Bohemians 1905 – club was acquired after bankruptcy in 2005 by Bohemians Supporters Trust. In 2025 Bohemians Supporters Trust owns approximately 10.24% of the club shares.

=== Ecuador ===
- Barcelona SC

=== England and Crown dependencies ===
==== Community created ====
- City of Liverpool F.C. – Registered as a community benefit society in October 2015.
- F.C. Isle of Man – Part of the Sporting Club Isle of Man umbrella, a registered charity. Ownership is obtained through annual membership, with a one-member, one-vote ethos. "The Sporting Club's constitution has been structured so that it can never dilute its shares in FC Isle of Man below 51%. This will ensure the community-owned ethos of the club will be protected."
- Maine Road F.C.

==== Supporter Buyout/Takeover ====
- AFC Crewe - AFC Crewe is fully owned by its fans, with each member paying a monthly subscription to the Community Benefit Society, Nufan, to own a share and become a board member. Board meetings, votes, and reports are conducted through the social messaging platform Discord.
- Aylesbury United F.C. – In July 2009, The Aylesbury United Supporters Trust was able to gain control of the club, which thus became a fan-owned football team.
- Bamber Bridge F.C. – The club is fully owned by a community organisation that represents supporters of the club.
- Banbury United F.C. – In August 2015, a supporter-led Community Benefit Society took formal control of the club.
- Basingstoke Town F.C.
- Bath City F.C. – In June 2015 "Big Bath City Bid" was launched by filmmaker and Bath fan Ken Loach to turn the club into a community-owned, 'one member one vote' club, in an effort to develop the club and clear its debts. The community ownership received backing from around the world, including ex-Manchester Utd footballer, Eric Cantona.
- Berwick Rangers F.C. – The Supporters' Club are the majority shareholders of Berwick Rangers Football Club. Note: this club plays in Scottish football, despite being located in England.
- Bradford (Park Avenue) A.F.C.
- Chesterfield F.C. – Bought by Chesterfield Football Supporters Society in 2001 from Darren Brown, who had run the club to the brink of insolvency (and was later jailed for crimes committed during his tenure at the club). The CFSS had held a meeting to discuss the parlous state of the club in March 2001, and a collection for funds yielded £6,000, which was used to buy the club several days later. The club entered insolvency as a result of the Brown-era financial mismanagement. CFSS struggled to escape that legacy and lost control of the club to a consortium of former directors in 2003. Bought back by Chesterfield FC Community Trust in August 2020.
- Congleton Town F.C. – The clubs shareholding was passed over to a newly formed supporters Trust in 2014
- Dorchester Town F.C. – from 2013 the Supporters Trust own a joint majority shareholding in the club.
- Dunstable Town F.C. – Announced its transition to a community benefit society on 9 August 2021.
- Exeter City F.C. – Following relegation to the Conference in 2003, the club was taken over by the Exeter City Supporters' Trust.
- Grays Athletic F.C.
- Hendon F.C. – Over the summer of 2010, the club was bought out by the Hendon FC Supporters Trust, an Industrial and Provident Society.
- Hull United A.F.C. – Registered as a community benefit society in July 2020.
- Hyde United F.C. – Buyout from former owner John Manship occurred on 2015-06-27.
- Kempston Rovers F.C.
- Lewes F.C. – On 9 July 2010 "The Rooks" became a member-owned club with six founder members of the new Rooks125 group forming the inaugural Board of the new Lewes Community Football Club ownership body. In April 2011, the club announced details on how fans will be able to become owners of Lewes FC. From July 2011 shares in the club have been available from £30 per annum. Shareholders are entitled to vote and stand for election to the board of directors. The first of these elections took place in October 2011. As of December 2011, the club has over 800 shareholders. In 2011, the club introduced the "Support and Save" scheme whereby shareholders are entitled to discounts from participating local businesses.
- Litherland REMYCA F.C.
- Newark Town F.C. – "Newark Town Football Club Limited was registered under the Industrial and Provident Societies Act 1965. It is known as an Industrial and Provident Society (IPS) or a Community Benefit Society and [was] regulated by the Financial Services Authority."
- Newport (IOW) F.C. – In 2008, ownership of the club was fully transferred to the supporter's trust.
- Northwich Victoria F.C. – Supporters assumed control of the club from the Rushe family in June 2017, almost five years after the creation of fan-owned breakaway club 1874 Northwich F.C.
- Peacehaven & Telscombe F.C. – In June 2016, the club was purchased by a community group representing fans of the club.
- Pilkington F.C. – Registered as a community benefit society in March 2020.
- Prescot Cables F.C. – The summer of 2005 saw a change in organisation, with a new football committee formed from the Supporter's Club taking over the reins of the club.
- Rochdale A.F.C.
- Saffron Walden Town F.C. – On 4 July 2012, members voted to convert the club into a Community Benefit Society.
- Taunton Town F.C. - Became a member-controlled club in 2025 after previous financial difficulties
- Tonbridge Angels F.C. – During the 2014–15 season, supporters took steps to purchase shares in the club to make it majority owned by supporters. They planned to contest the 2015–16 pre-season Supporters Direct shield, with their first match against Fisher F.C. on 25 July.
- Wythenshawe F.C. – Became a community benefit society in March 2017 (Wythenshawe AFC Limited, Community Benefit Society No.7250).

==== Phoenix clubs ====
- AFC Rushden & Diamonds – The club was formed in July 2011 by supporters after Rushden & Diamonds were expelled from the Football Conference and subsequently liquidated. This occurred as a result of the club's stadium (Nene Park) being possessed by Conalgen Enterprises S.A. (registered in Panama) via a fixed charge negotiated by outgoing owner Keith Cousins. A mere 4 months passed between Cousins selling a "debt free" football club, and its inability to continue as a going concern. After expulsion from the football pyramid and eviction from Nene Park an open meeting chaired by a supporters group called SaveRDFC, a mandate was agreed upon to create a phoenix club, fully owned and controlled by its supporters.
- Bury AFC – Established in December 2019 by fans of Bury FC after its expulsion from the EFL. Operates on the one member one vote principle.
- Canterbury City F.C. – Reformed in 2007, they are the first football club formed as a community interest company. Under the club's constitution, membership "is open to all" and includes the right to vote in the election of "key members of the board".
- Chester F.C. – Phoenix club formed in 2010 after Chester City F.C. wound up and owned by City Fans United as of 2024 they have just over 1500 members and are aiming for 2000
- Darlington F.C. – Darlington FC Supporters Group (registered as Darlington 1883 Supporters Society Limited, a community benefit society) held 82.3% of the share capital of the club (Darlington 1883 Limited), as of May 2018. DFCSG was established due to a 2015 merger between three fan groups: Darlington FC Community Interest Company (which represented approximately 800 fans), Darlington Supporters Club and Darlington Supporters Trust.
- East Thurrock Community FC - Fan owned football club formed in 2024 after closure of East Thurrock united in 2023.
- Fisher F.C. – The club was formed in 2009 by members of the 'Fisher Supporters Trust' when Fisher Athletic Football Club was wound up in the High Court due to financial problems and closed down.
- Hinckley A.F.C. – Replaced Hinckley United. Formed by fans in 2014. Structured as a community benefit society.
- Runcorn Linnets F.C. – The club is run by a trust, which is an Industrial and Provident Society, and is registered with the Financial Services Authority.
- Scarborough Athletic F.C. – Following the liquidation of Scarborough, Scarborough Athletic was founded as a continuation or rebirth of the previous club by a supporters' trust named The Seadog Trust. They took on the same red kit, nickname, motto and official club logo from the original club.
- South Liverpool F.C.

==== Protest Clubs ====
- A.F.C. Liverpool – Cooperative. Formed as a protest against high ticket prices in the Premier League.
- AFC Wimbledon – Majority shares owned by The Dons Trust, a Supporters' Trust., formed as a breakaway club in the surrounding controversy of the Relocation of Wimbledon F.C. to Milton Keynes.
- Clapton Community F.C. – Established in early 2018, in opposition to how the owner of Clapton F.C. was ignoring the club's membership.
- F.C. United of Manchester – A Community Benefit Society. One member, one vote basis. Formed by Manchester United fans in protest of the Glazer takeover.
- Enfield Town F.C. – The club was founded on 23 June 2001 by the Enfield Supporters' Trust due to disaffection with the owners of Enfield F.C.
- 1874 Northwich F.C. – The club was founded on 15 November 2012 following a vote by former Northwich Victoria supporters, who were members of the Northwich Victoria Supporters Trust. They voted almost unanimously, 141 to 4, in favour of breaking away from the club they supported and forming a new team in their town. The club is fully owned by its supporters, and is run by a democratically elected board.

==== Minority supporter owned ====
- Accrington Stanley F.C. – Accrington Stanley Supporters Fund owns 12%
- Cambridge City F.C. – As of September 2011, the Cambridge City Supporters' Trust (CCST) owned 10% (a minority) of the club. According to the CCST secretary, CCST now only has appointment power for one director position.
- Carlisle United F.C. – The United Trust (also known as the Carlisle United Official Supporters' Club) owns a 25.4% stake in the club. At least one elected member of the trust sits on the board of the club.
- Chesham United F.C. – As of the 2014/15 season, Chesham United Supporters' Trust (CUST) held only a 2.69% shareholding in the club, and has "no direct responsibility for running the parent club." CUST had previously acquired at least 43.25% ownership of the club as of September 2011. CUST's previously stated ambition was to earn no more than 49.9% of the club, "a safeguard so that no one party has an overall majority stake in the club".
- Dial Square F.C. – Established "in response to [Arsenal F.C.] fans who were disillusioned by the business-orientated approach that is beleaguering the majority of Premier League clubs." 86 fans purchased a share in the club during its initial share issue, which ended 31 March 2021. Stuart Morgan remains the majority shareholder as of April 2021, controlling "75% or more" of shares and voting rights, and having the "right to appoint and remove directors". On 19 April 2021, in light of Arsenal's decision to join the so-called European Super League, Dial Square announced that its second share issue would begin earlier than originally scheduled.
- Dulwich Hamlet F.C. – Dulwich Hamlet Football Community Mutual Limited (registered society number 29531R), commonly known as the Dulwich Hamlet Supporters' Trust, owns "more than 25% but not more than 50%" of the club's shares. Two of the club's five board members are appointed by the trust, and all board members are trust members.
- Gateshead F.C. – The Gateshead Soul Supporters Trust (registered as the Gateshead Soul Supporters Society Limited) purchased a minority club shareholding in February 2021.
- Grimsby Town F.C. – Mariners Trust owns 14.13%
- Lincoln City F.C. – The Red Imps Community Trust (legally known as the Lincoln City Supporters' Society Limited) owned 18.9% of the shares of the club's holding company, as of August 2017. The Trust also elect one member to sit on the club's board of directors.
- Luton Town F.C. – As of 2012, the Luton Town Supporters' Trust owned 50,000 shares in the club's holding company, Luton Town Football Club 2020 Limited, and holds the right of veto over any changes to the club's identity, including name, nickname, colours, club crest and mascot.
- Norwich City F.C. – The Canaries Trust are the 12th-largest shareholder of Norwich City, as of June 2021.
- Wealdstone F.C. – The Wealdstone FC Supporters Club owns 11.4% of shares, making it the second largest shareholder in the club.
- Wycombe Wanderers F.C. – On 30 June 2012, the Wycombe Wanderers Supporters Trust formally took over the club. which resulted in financial stabilization and ended a transfer embargo. In February 2020 Rob Couhig completed his takeover purchasing a 75% share, leaving the Wycombe Wanderers Supporters Trust with a 25% share and former chairman Trevor Stroud keeping a seat on the club's board.
- York City F.C. – York City Supporters' Society owns 25%. Became owned by the York City Supporters' Trust in 2002 after a period of insolvency caused by then-Chairman Douglas Craig's separation of the club from ownership of the stadium at Bootham Crescent and subsequent ownership under John Batchelor. The Trust negotiated a deal to buy back their old stadium using a loan provided by the Football Foundation but the strain of Batchelor-era debt servicing and repayments to the Foundation saw the Trust become minority shareholders with the majority stake owned by the McGill Family.

==== Former supporter owned ====
- AFC Telford United – Sold out to private ownership 24 October 2016.
- Brentford F.C. – Bees United (the Brentford FC Supporters' Trust) used to own 60.3% of the shares of Brentford FC; Matthew Benham, himself a fan, owned 30.7%; with other supporters owning 9.0%. The Supporters' Trust eventually sold their entire shareholding to Matthew Benham, who also acquired all other minority shareholding to own 100% of the shares.
- Bromsgrove Sporting F.C. – Founded in 2009 as a supporters consortium with the plan to buy Bromsgrove Rovers and take them out of administration. When another owner was found for Rovers it was decided to create a new club instead. The Bromsgrove Sporting Supporters' Society, a registered community benefit society, owned 42% of the club as of May 2022. Despite majority ownership, the chairman and his friends are claimed to exercise control of the club. Although the club markets itself as fan owned, this has been disputed.
- Bury F.C. – Came under supporter ownership in 2002 after the club entered administration, split between Save Our Shakers Trust (63.8%) and The Bury F.C. Supporters Society Ltd (Forever Bury) (11%) Property entrepreneur Stewart Day bought the fans' stake in 2013 following financial difficulties for the club, which had necessitated taking out a PFA loan to pay players' wages and the club being placed under a transfer embargo.
- Notts County F.C.
- Portsmouth F.C. – Portsmouth became the largest fan-owned football club in England, after the Pompey Supporters Trust (PST) successfully gained possession of Fratton Park in April 2013. However, in May 2017, the PST members voted in favor to sell its ownership to former Disney chief executive, Michael Eisner; this value estimated to be at £5.67 million.
- Scarborough Town F.C. – This was a second supporter-owned "phoenix" club formed after the liquidation of Scarborough, and essentially competed with the larger Scarborough Athletic F.C. for former Scarborough F.C. fans, though focused more upon a youth team rather than a senior one. It eventually folded. The club was run on a democratic basis by a management committee. Membership was open to everyone by payment of an annual fee. All adult members had an equal vote and were encouraged to use this vote at every AGM and EGM. It had two complete seasons, the first in the Wearside Football League, then being promoted to the Humber Premier League, Division One. The club were champions of both leagues and were very well attended. Despite this success, financial problems overcame the club during its final year, resulting in its records for that season being expunged.
- Stockport County F.C. – Purchased in 2005 by the Stockport County Supporters' Co-operative but was sold to an investment group in 2009 after near-bankruptcy. A long-term goal of the Supporters' Co-Operative is to buy the ground and to buy back the club.

=== Finland ===
- HIFK Fotboll
- Tampere United
- TamU-K

=== France ===
- Ménilmontant FC 1871
- SC Bastia – The Corsican club became a cooperative society of collective interest, a SCIC, in 2019. The club is divided into five colleges: SCIC SC Bastia Familles Luiggi & Ferrandi (38%), Financial Stakeholders (22%), Fans (20%), local administrative institutions (10%) and current and former employees (10%).

=== Germany ===
In Germany, majority control by a single entity (person or company) is not permitted by the Deutsche Fußball Liga, and this is consistent with German law. The law requires a registered club shall have at least seven members when it is founded. The German Football Association requires in its statutes that either a club, or a limited company which is controlled by a club with 50% + 1 vote, can get a licence to participate in the German first or second league. In the lower leagues, it is required to be a club.

An exception to the 50+1 rule allows a company or individual investor that has substantially funded a club for at least 20 years to gain a controlling stake in that club. This exception most notably applies to Bayer Leverkusen and VfL Wolfsburg. Both were founded as sports clubs for employees of major corporations (respectively Bayer and Volkswagen) long before the 50+1 rule was established. More recently, SAP co-founder Dietmar Hopp has gained control of 1899 Hoffenheim—where he had been a youth player—after having funded the club's rise from the lowest reaches of German football to the Bundesliga.

RB Leipzig have been accused of bypassing the law through legal loopholes, essentially not being fan-owned and undermining the system.

Shares of Borussia Dortmund, a German Bundesliga Club, are traded on the German stock market and are largely held by fans.

TC Freisenbruch, a club which was founded in Essen in 1902, is managed completely by the fans. The team currently plays in the ninth division of the German football league. Since July 2016, the club is managed via a webpage, where the fans can make their decisions about, for example, the starting line-up or the prices for the jersey.

=== Greece ===
- Aris – From 2006 to 2014 Aris F.C. was fan-owned through Aris Members club .It went bankrupt and was relegated for the first time in its history to 3rd Division.
- Panathinaikos F.C. – Vardinogiannis family agreed in 2012 to transfer its 54.75% stake of the club to the "Panathinaikos Alliance" group. Each member has one vote in decision-making procedures, regardless of how many shares each individual holds. As of 2016 Panathinaikos Alliance shares have been reduced to 15,12%.
- Ionikos FC was owned and operated by fans for a short time.

=== India ===
- Travancore Royals FC – The club which was formed in 2018 by a group of passionate football lovers of Thiruvananthapuram City, Kerala is the first and the only fan owned professional football club in India. The club competes in Kerala Premier League, a fifth division state league in the country.

=== Indonesia ===
- Riverside Forest

=== Ireland ===
- Bohemians
- Sligo Rovers

=== Israel ===
- Hapoel Jerusalem F.C. – The club conceived and founded in 2007 by Hapoel Jerusalem fans unhappy with the team's management. The club currently plays in the Israeli Premier League (first tier in Israel) and is based at Teddy Stadium in Jerusalem. When it was founded, the club was registered in the bottom tier as Hapoel Katamon Jerusalem and became the first fan-owned football club in Israel. In 2020 the club finally managed to take over the original name, when the original Hapoel Jerusalem went bankrupt and ceased to exist. By doing so, the club fulfilled its original aim of taking over the club.
- Hapoel Petah Tikva F.C. – The club was purchased by the fans using a non profit organization named 'The Blue' in 2019. The club currently plays in the Israeli Premier League (first tier in Israel) and is based at HaMoshava Stadium in Petah Tikva.

==== Protest Clubs ====
- F.C. Haifa (Hapoel Rubi Shapira Haifa) – The club was founded in 2014 by Hapoel Haifa fans, after years of protesting against the team's management. The club is operated by the fans' association called "Ir HaPoalim" (city of workers). The club entered the Israeli football league system at its lowest level, liga Gimel in 2014 and promoted to liga bet at the end of 2014/15 season. The team promoted to Liga Alef at the end of this season. The club ended its activity at the end of 2022/23 season.
- A.S. Nordia Jerusalem – The club was founded in 2014 by Beitar Jerusalem fans, in protest against the racist tones of other Beitar fans in the previous years. The club entered the Israeli football league system at its lowest level, liga Gimel in 2014.
- Maccabi Ironi Ashdod FC was re-established after 16 years and opened the 2015/16 season as "fan-owned" club in the Liga Gimel South which they managed to finish on first place and get promoted to liga bet.
- Hapoel Ashdod F.C.
- F.C Kfar Saba 1928 – The club was founded by fans of Hapoel Kfar Saba F.C. in 2023 as a protest against years of failures under private ownership, especially the years under the ownership of former Hapoel Kfar Saba player Itzhak Shum. The club is currently playing in Liga Gimel, the 5th tier football league.

==== Phoenix Clubs ====
- Maccabi Kabilio Jaffa – The club was re-established in 2008 after a period of 8 years since the original club Maccabi Jaffa has gone bankrupt. Since the club was re-established it won two consecutive Championships (Liga Gimel, Liga Bet) and it played in Liga Alef South - The third league in its importance in Israel, until their promotion to Liga Leumit in 2021/2022. The club's greatest achievement was qualifying to 'The Round of 16' in the Israel State Cup. A vast majority of the fans are Israeli with Bulgarian roots since the Original club was founded in 1949 by Jews from the Bulgarian community. The club is named after the great Goalkeeper - Herzl Kabilio.
- F.C. Tzeirei Tamra The club was re-established in 2013 after a period of 3 years as a successor club, to Hapoel Bnei Tamra, which was dissolved in 2010.

=== Italy ===
- A.S.D. Brutium Cosenza
- A.S.D. Calcistica Popolare Trebesto
- A.S.D. Ovidiana Sulmona
- A.S.D. Terminio – Established in Avellino province in 2020, became a fan-owned football club in 2025 as a protest against the trend of billionaire-run clubs. After merging with Football Club Group LCA, Terminio is stewarded by over 250 member-owners from 12 different countries as of January 2025.
- C.S. Lebowski – Protest club formed by former Fiorentina fans.
- Cava United FC – Protest club established by former Cavese 1919 supporters who disagreed with bankrupt predecessor S.S. Cavese 1919 taking over U.S.D. Pro Cavese 1394 and rebranding it to avoid restarting from the bottom of Italy's club football pyramid. Some Cava United supporters claim to still technically support Cavese 1919, but became disenfranchised by modern football and wanted to create a fan-operated club as an alternative. Two-thirds of Cava United's board members are appointed by the Sogo Cavese supporters' trust, who operate under the slogan Il Calcio è della Gente ("football belongs to the people"); the remaining third of board members are financing members.
- Clivense Calcio, known before as ChievoVerona Calcio.
- Palermo Calcio Popolare – Established as a protest club in February 2015, when fans of former Serie A club Palermo opposed the actions of then-chairman Maurizio Zamparini. The new club does not accept shirt sponsorship, and unusually for Italian amateur clubs, does not pay anything to its players or coaches.
- U.S.D. Città di Fasano – Established as a phoenix club in 2012 and taken over by the supporters' trust Il Fasano siamo noi in 2016.

=== Japan ===
- Fujieda MYFC – Previously supporter owned. Following in the footsteps of Ebbsfleet United, supporters could vote online on matters such as team tactics, management, personnel, etc. However, due to a low number of people willing to pay a membership fee for voting rights, the online owner aspect was discontinued in 2015.
- Yokohama F.C. – The club was formed in 1999, following the merger of the city's two J. League clubs, Yokohama Flügels and Yokohama Marinos the previous year. Flügels supporters, whose club was essentially dissolved, rejected the suggestion that they should start supporting Marinos, their crosstown rivals. Instead, with money raised through donations from the general public and an affiliation with IMG, the talent management company, the former Flügels supporters founded the Yokohama Fulie Sports Club. Following the socio model used by FC Barcelona, the Fulie Sports Club created Yokohama F.C., the first professional sports team in Japan owned and operated by its supporters. However, unlike most socio-based clubs in other countries, Yokohama FC members do not have formal input regarding the makeup of the club's board of directors.

=== Mali ===
- Jeanne d'Arc FC – At the end of the 2006/07 season, a group of Stade Malien supporters broke away to form their own football club, taking the "Jeanne d'Arc" name with them. The name is a reference to one of two defunct clubs which combined to form Stade Malien, Jeanne d'Arc du Soudan (founded 1938) in 1960. In late 2007 this group formed Jeanne d'Arc FC Bamako, which competed in lower division football during the 2007/08 season.

=== Nigeria ===
- Mighty Jets F.C.

=== Northern Ireland ===
==== Fan-Owned ====
- Cliftonville F.C. – Cliftonville FC is owned and run by the Members.
- Linfield FC - owned and run by members

==== Minority Fan-Owned ====
- Crusaders F.C.

=== Norway ===
All association football clubs in Norway are owned by their members.

=== Poland ===
- AKS Zły – Alternative Sport Club ZŁY was found in summer 2015 by community of independent Warsaw football fans. In 2016 club entered official league competitions of PZPN/MZPN with two teams – male & female – both starting from lowest divisions. Club adopted as its home-stadium infrastructure of DOSiR Praga Północ (ul.Kawęczyńska 44), which is better known among fans of ASK as 'DON PEDRO ARENA'. AKS ZŁY is unique in sense of equal treatment of male and female football, as well as in sense of fans-culture free of any violence and hatred. In spring 2019 both AKS ZŁY teams are on the top positions in their leagues. The association of fans which own this club has about 200 members (March 2019) and the club has several thousands of sympathisers around the country
- Górnik 1979 Łęczna – a club founded in 2011 by Górnik Łęczna fans who were unhappy with the name change to GKS Bogdanka. The club eventually changed its name back in 2013 but the fan owned counterpart has continued to operate in amateur football leagues. On 22 August 2014 the club withdrew from all competitions and ceased to operate, the reason cited were the lack of funds and the fact that the original Górnik Łęczna team went to back to its original name scrapping the GKS Bogdanka name.
- Hutnik Nowa Huta – Hutnik Kraków fans who were unhappy with the club management decided to take the club into their own hands and try to restore the club's former glory, after the team was dissolved due to its debts. It was refounded as Hutnik Nowa Huta in 2010 and was admitted to the fifth tier.
- KKS Wiara Lecha – club founded by Lech Poznań supporters in 2011. Only active supporters can play in the team and they have to have made a contribution to the supporter scene in order to be admitted to the squad.
- KSF Zielona Góra – football club founded by fans of speedway team Falubaz Zielona Góra.
- Kraków Dragoons FC - the first foreign-founded, multinational football club competing in the Polish league system, with over 20 nationalities in the squad.
- Widzew Łódź – club reactivated by fanatics. The club was created because fans of the original Widzew have been in a long conflict with the club board. Only Widzew supporters can play in the team.
- Zawisza Bydgoszcz – After the controversial owner Radosław Osuch disbanded the club after months of warring with the fans, the fans reformed the club in 2016 and had to start the new season from the lowest level on the football pyramid.

=== Portugal ===
- Os Belenenses – split from the Liga Portugal 2 side B-SAD
- FC Paços de Ferreira – The football club FC Paços de Ferreira is owned by its members (socios).

Benfica, FC Porto and Sporting CP football teams are also fan owned through a SAD for football as far as the club remains the owner of a majority of the SAD's stock. Some legal provisions are made to guarantee that in any case, the club have the last word on any major changes in the club and its SAD.

=== Romania ===
- ASU Politehnica Timișoara – an amateur phoenix club formed after the dissolution of FC Politehnica Timișoara. ACS Recaș was moved to Timișoara and was renamed ACS Poli Timișoara but some fans decided to create and support an amateur team, stating that ACS Poli Timișoara is not the moral successor of the old club.
- FC Vaslui 2002 – formed in 2014 after dissolution of FC Vaslui in 2014
- LSS Voința Sibiu – formed in 2012 as a phoenix club of CSU Voința Sibiu
- AS Atletic United Ploiești – formed in 2016 as a phoenix club of Atletic Club United Ploiesti
- ASC Oțelul Galați – formed in 2016, phoenix club of FC Oțelul Galați
- Farul Constanța – fans refounded the team which was dissolved in the summer of 2016.
- Petrolul Ploiești – fans refounded the team which was dissolved in the summer of 2016.
- Olimpia Satu Mare fans refounded the team which was dissolved in 2018.

=== Russia ===
- FC Kuban Krasnodar – fans refounded the football club that was dissolved in 2018.

=== Scotland ===
==== Majority fan-owned ====
- Annan Athletic F.C. – Annan Athletic Community Football Club Limited is 100% owned by its fans, and is registered as a community benefit society.
- Clyde F.C. – 100% owned by its fans.
- Gretna F.C. 2008
- Motherwell F.C. – In March 2016, 76% shareholder Les Hutchison handed his shares over to the Well Society for £1, making Motherwell the first top-flight club in the United Kingdom to become majority supporter owned.
- Queen's Park F.C. - Owned by the club's members since its foundation in 1867.
- Partick Thistle F.C. - Fanowned after Euromillions winner Colin Weir bought the club and gave it to the fans.
- St Mirren F.C. – In July 2016, former club director Gordon Scott and the St Mirren Independent Supporters Association had a joint bid accepted for a majority stake in the club. The club became majority supporter owned on 27 July 2021.
- Stirling Albion F.C.
- Heart of Midlothian F.C. – In 2014, when the club were in administration, the Edinburgh club was bought over by the Ann Budge-fronted Bidco group. The 2014/15 away strip featured the fan-backed Foundation of Hearts as its chief sponsor, and the 2015/16 third strip featured the names of 8000 supporters who donate to the foundation. On 30 August 2021, Ann Budge officially transferred the club's shares to Foundation of Hearts and now is officially the biggest fan owned club in the United Kingdom.
- Greenock Morton F.C. – Morton Club Together began in 2019 with the aim of contributing to the first team playing budget. That goal developed into pursuing community ownership and now, as of June 2021, Greenock Morton Football Club is owned by its fans. You can read more information here.

==== Minority fan-owned ====
- Celtic F.C. – As of March 2021, the Celtic Trust held 30,000 shares, or 0.03%, of Celtic PLC.
- Dundee F.C. – As of February 2019, Dundee FC Supporters Society Limited held 12.7% "ordinary" shares and 7.7% "A ordinary" shares, which amount to a total shareholding of 20.4%, making the DFCSS the second-largest shareholder in Dundee Football Club.
- Dundee United F.C. – ArabTRUST owned 3.27% of the club, making it the second-largest shareholder, as of July 2020.
- Dunfermline Athletic F.C. – Pars United Community Interest Company (PUCIC), the holding company of Dunfermline Athletic Football Club Ltd, obtained a 93.6% stake in the club in October 2013, and has a supervisory role over DAFC. PUCIC has six directors: two appointed by the Pars Supporters' Trust (PST), two are "patrons", and two are appointed by all shareholders. As of September 2020, there were more than 30 shareholders of the club, the largest of which was the PST (which held a 28.3% stake in the club, as of March 2015). DAFC is made up of seven directors, one of whom is appointed by the PST. In September 2020, the club announced its intention to sell a 75.1% (supermajority) shareholding to German firm DAFC Fussball GmbH, which would end the club's fan-owned status.
- Hibernian F.C. – In December 2014, the club publicised plans to sell up to 51% ownership of the club to Hibernian Supporters Limited. The fan shareholding in June 2017 stood at 34%, but had declined to 15.4% by 2019.
- Kilmarnock F.C. – As of December 2020, Kilmarnock Supporters' Society Ltd owned 5.36% of the club.
- Livingston F.C. – The Livi for Life Supporters Trust owned roughly 5% of the club, as of April 2021.
- Raith Rovers F.C. – Raith Supporters Trust and Raith Rovers Supporters Club held a combined 5% of the club, as of March 2021.
- Rangers F.C. – Club 1872, a supporters' group, owned 10.71% of the club, as of 2017.
- Stenhousemuir F.C. – The Warriors Supporters Trust (legally the Warriors Sports Society) owned 20% of the club, as of August 2020. The club is structured as a community interest company.

==== Formerly Fan-Owned ====
- East Stirlingshire F.C. – The club was owned by Shiretrust (East Stirlingshire Supporters Society Limited) between 2011 and 2017.

=== South Korea ===
- Seoul United FC – Cooperative

=== Spain ===
In Spain, most professional clubs in the top two tiers have been converted to public limited sports companies (sociedad anónima deportiva, or SAD). However, four clubs have thus far resisted such a legal restructuring:

- Athletic Bilbao
- CA Osasuna
- FC Barcelona – The club is organised as a registered association and its 143,855 members, called socis, form an assembly of delegates which is the highest governing body of the club.
- Real Madrid CF – The club is run by socios, fans that pay an annual membership due, in exchange for benefits, such as the right to vote on issues and more accessibility to tickets. The fans are represented by a Club President. Florentino Pérez is the current Club President.

Many teams in the third tier and below are structured as members' clubs. However, a movement known as "popular football" (fútbol popular) began in 2007, consisting of clubs "that want to return to the democratic, social and community roots of the sport." As of February 2021, there are 19 such clubs:

- Atlético Club de Socios – Former Atlético Madrid fans, disillusioned by the club's increasingly commercial nature, who formed a breakaway club in 2007.
- Avilés Stadium CF – Founded in 2015 by Real Avilés supporters disillusioned with unpopular chairman José María Tejero.
- CD Independiente de Vallecas
- CF Reus Roig-i-Negre – Phoenix club established in 2019 to replace CF Reus Deportiu, which was dissolved in 2020.
- CAP Ciudad de Murcia – Phoenix club established to replace Ciudad de Murcia, which relocated to Granada in 2007 and was dissolved in 2010.
- CFP Orihuela Deportiva – Phoenix club established to replace Orihuela Deportiva CF, which was dissolved in 1995.
- CP Almería – Established in 1983, became fan-owned in 2012.
- CD Cuenca-Mestallistes 1925 – Former Valencia CF fans, disillusioned by the club's increasingly commercial nature, who formed a breakaway club, based on the history of the former CD Cuenca.
- FC Tarraco – Established in November 2012.
- Huracán de Castellón – A football club established as a rejection of the commercial nature of CD Castellón.
- Ortuellako Jendea – Similar to Athletic Bilbao's policy, Only local residents may play for the men's team. The club also has a women's team, which is not restricted to local players.
- Rosal FC – Established in 1929.
- SD Logroñés – Phoenix club established to replace CD Logroñés, which was dissolved in 2009.
- UC Ceares – Established in 1946, became fan-owned in 2011.
- UD Ourense – Phoenix club established to replace CD Ourense, which was dissolved in 2014.
- UD Aspense – Established in 2016.
- UP Palencia – Phoenix club established to replace CF Palencia, which was dissolved in 2012.
- Unionistas de Salamanca CF – Phoenix club established to honor UD Salamanca, which was dissolved in 2013.
- Xerez Deportivo FC – Phoenix club established to replace Xerez CD, which was nearly dissolved in 2013.

=== Sweden ===
All sports clubs in Sweden are owned by its members. The Swedish Sports Confederation allows clubs to create limited companies together with investors as long as the club controls a majority of the votes.

=== Switzerland ===
FC Luzern - Established in 1901. In 2023, a group of fans founded the association "FCL-Basis" and this association, which is open to all fans for membership, acquired 10% of the shares of FC Luzern-Innerschweiz AG for the amount of CHF 1 million. Just a few months after its foundation, "FCL-Basis" already has more than 1,300 members, all of whom now effectively own part of the club. In addition to various veto rights, "FCL-Basis" is also guaranteed a seat on the Board of Directors of FC Luzern-Innerschweiz AG.

=== Ukraine ===
- Metalist 1925
- Veres Rivne (until 2019)

=== United States ===
==== Active clubs ====
- Bearfight FC of Wilmington – Based in Wilmington, Delaware.
- Chattanooga FC – Minority fan-owned, based on purchased equity (shares).
- DeKalb County United
- Detroit City FC – 10% of the club's "units" are owned by individual fans, purchased in less than five days during the "Be An Owner" campaign in August 2020.
- Edgewater Castle FC
- Lansing Common FC – Structured as a 501(c)(3) non-profit. Supporters elect the board of directors and have the final say on major club decisions.
- Minneapolis City SC
- Minnesota Aurora FC
- Oakland County FC – The OCFC Supporters' Trust owns a minority shareholding of the club. An initial share issue made 400 shares available for purchase, the equivalent of 10% equity of the club. When the share issue closed on April 1, 2019, 157 shares (at $60 each) had been purchased by fans, or the equivalent of 3.925% of the club's equity. Subsequent share issues are planned for the future.
- Oakland Roots SC and Oakland Soul SC: opened to a community investment round in 2023.
- Palm Beach Breakers AFC (formerly known as Gold Coast Inter AFC) – Minority fan ownership, as of September 2019.
- PDX FC – Located in Portland, Oregon. Fan ownership is based on purchased equity (shares).
- San Francisco City FC – Supporters own 51% of the club through a member-elected, non-profit board; investors control 49% of the club and sit on an investors' board. The chair of the non-profit board, investors and operational staff meet monthly to discuss club matters.
- Snohomish County FC – Minority fan-owned. A 26-member "founders club" have one representative on the club's board.
- Club Xolos USA U-23

==== Dormant and dissolved clubs ====
- AC Chehalem Valley – A women's club based out of Newport, Oregon. Membership-based. Fans elected the non-profit club's board. In February 2023, the club announced it was entering dormancy.
- Himmarshee FC – 100% fan-owned club, based on membership. Located in Greater Fort Lauderdale, Florida. Created after the Fort Lauderdale Strikers (2006–2016) folded.
- Seattle Sounders FC 2 – The reserve team of Seattle Sounders FC was 20 percent owned by non-profit Sounders Community Trust. However, the team was relocated to Tacoma for the 2018 season and was rebranded as Tacoma Defiance ahead of the 2019 season. The Sounders Community Trust became inactive in 2019, and the status of its ownership stake in the team is unclear.
- Union Dubuque FC – Fans "participate in club meetings and board member elections".

=== Uruguay ===
- Club Atlético Peñarol
- Club Nacional de Football
- Defensor Sporting Club
- Club Atlético River Plate
- Liverpool Fútbol Club
- Montevideo Wanderers Fútbol Club
- Centro Atlético Fénix
- Club Atlético Juventud de Las Piedras
- Racing Club de Montevideo
- Club Atlético Cerro
- Danubio Fútbol Club

=== Wales ===
Chester F.C. is in the England section

- Bangor 1876 F.C. – Protest club founded in 2019. The Supporters association formed in 2001 and had 250 members in 2015
- Merthyr Town F.C. – a phoenix club founded by the fans of the liquidated Merthyr Tydfil F.C. in 2010.
- Newport County A.F.C. – 27% taken over by fans in 2015
- C.P.D. Y Rhyl 1879 – Founded by the fans' association of the old Rhyl F.C. in 2020 after the former club was wound up as a result of the COVID-19 pandemic.
- Swansea City A.F.C. – The Swansea City Supporters Society Ltd currently consists of around 15,000 online members and over 800 proper the trust owns 9% of the club, with their involvement hailed by Supporters Direct as "the most high profile example of the involvement of a supporters' trust in the direct running of a club".
- Ton Pentre F.C. – Registered as a community benefit society in April 2016.

==== Former ====
- Wrexham A.F.C. – In September 2011, the Wrexham Supporters Trust took over the club just a month after fans raised £127,000 to pay a bond to the Football Conference to prevent the club from being expelled from the league. On 12 December 2011, the WST's ownership of the club was finally ratified consisting of more than 4,000 members. Ultimately, the WST sold the club to the Canadian American duo Ryan Reynolds and Rob McElhenney.

== Australian Rules football ==
AFL:

- Carlton
- Collingwood
- Essendon
- Geelong
- Hawthorn
- Melbourne
- North Melbourne
- Richmond
- St Kilda
- Brisbane Lions
- Western Bulldogs

These clubs all operate sides in the AFL Women's league.

=== State Leagues ===
==== Tasmania ====
===== TSL =====
- Burnie
- Clarence
- Devonport
- Glenorchy
- Hobart City
- Lauderdale
- Launceston
- North Launceston
- Tigers

====== North West Football League ======
- Circular Head Giants
- Devonport Magpies
- East Devonport Swans
- Latrobe Demons
- Penguin Two Blues
- Ulverstone Robins
- Wynyard Cats

====== Northern Tasmanian Football Association ======
Division One

- Bracknell
- Bridgenorth
- Deloraine
- George Town
- Hillwood
- Longford
- Rocherlea
- Scottsdale
- South Launceston

Division Two

- Bridport
- East Coast
- Evendale
- Lilydale
- Meander Valley
- Old Launcestonians
- Old Scotch Collegians
- Perth
- St Patrick's Old Collegians
- Tamar Cats
- University Mowbray

====== Southern Football League ======
- Brighton
- Claremont
- Cygnant
- Dodges Ferry
- Hobart
- Huonville Lions
- Lindersfarne
- New Norfolk
- Sorell

====== King Island Football Association ======
- Currie
- Grassy
- North

== Baseball ==
=== Mexico ===
- Diablos Rojos del México

=== United States ===
- Atlanta Braves
- Auburn Doubledays
- Bethesda Big Train
- Burlington Bees fan-ownership is not clear
- Oakland Ballers
- Rochester Red Wings
- Rockville Express fan-ownership is not clear
- Silver Spring–Takoma Thunderbolts fan-ownership is not clear
- Toledo Mud Hens fan-ownership is not clear
- Vermont Mountaineers

== Basketball ==
- Hapoel Ramat Gan B.C. – The team played European level in the 80's and was shut down in 1986, was re-opened as a fans owned team at 2011, played in Israeli 2nd tier league Liga Leumit until their relegation in 2023 to Liga Artzit (3rd tier).
- Hapoel Haifa B.C. – In the 2011/12 season, the fans re-formed the club.
- Hapoel Tel Aviv B.C. - Originally one of the founders of the Israeli Basketball League, the club was under a failed management of sports businessman Shaul Aisenberg for years, before being purchased by the oligarch Vladimir Gosinski and managing to return to their previous glory. After Gosinski sold the club back to Aisenberg, the club deteriorated again and moved out of the historic Ussishkin Hall, which was demolished in 2006. In 2007, after Aisenberg decided to play in Yad Eliyahu Hall, the home court of their city rivals, the fans established Hapoel Ussishkin B.C. as a protest club. The club climbed up from Liga Bet (the 5th tier basketball league) to Liga Leumit (2nd tier) within 4 years, and while their play in Liga Artzit (3rd tier), the rights to the name of Hapoel Tel Aviv B.C. were bought by private businessman Ofer Eliyahu, which were donated to the Hapoel Ussishkin fans trust with no cost. Therefore, ever since their promotion to Liga Leumit, the club is playing under the name Hapoel Tel Aviv, and the foundation was renamed to "Hapoel Ussishkin Tel Aviv fans trust". The club was promoted to the Israeli BSL in 2012, after getting the Liga Leumit championship title in that season, and plays there ever since, while in the last few years the club returned to their top league status. In 2023 the ownership structure was changed, in which businessman Ofer Yannai gained 51% ownership of the main team, and the fans trust remaining in the new structure with a 19% stake, and full ownership on the rest of the club's teams (including the U19 team).
- Pallacanestro Varese – owned by fan consortium "Varese nel cuore" ("Varese in the Heart")
- Virtus Pallacanestro Bologna
- Townsville Crocodiles – in August 2013, the Crocodiles announced that Barrier Reef Basketball Pty Ltd was relinquishing its National Basketball League license, putting the Crocodiles' 2013–14 season in doubt. In September 2013, the Crocodiles re-entered the league as a community owned club under head coach, Shawn Dennis.

== Futsal ==
- MNK Futsal Dinamo – club owned by supporters of association football club GNK Dinamo

== Gridiron football ==
=== American football ===
- Green Bay Packers: the only fan-owned team in any of North America's four traditional major leagues (discounting the publicly traded Atlanta Braves), the Packers have been owned by a community-based corporation since 1923. The NFL currently bans such an ownership structure, but grandfathered in the Packers ownership.

=== Canadian football ===
- Saskatchewan Roughriders: Since 2004, the Roughriders have sold shares of the team in four runs of limited share offerings, dubbed as "series". Prior to 2004, the Roughriders operated as a non-profit with no owner or share capital.
- Winnipeg Blue Bombers: operates as a "community-owned" non-profit with no owner or share capital.

== Ice hockey ==
=== Canada ===
- Kitchener Rangers (Ontario Hockey League)
- Lethbridge Hurricanes (162 shareholders representing 175 shares as of 2019) (Western Hockey League)
- Moose Jaw Warriors (Western Hockey League)
- Prince Albert Raiders (Western Hockey League)
- Swift Current Broncos (Western Hockey League)

=== Poland ===
- Stoczniowiec 2014 Gdańsk

== Rugby league ==
=== Australia ===
NRL:

- Bulldogs
- Cronulla-Sutherland Sharks
- Parramatta Eels
- Penrith Panthers
- St. George Illawarra Dragons
- Sydney Roosters
- Wests Tigers

=== United Kingdom ===
RFL:

- Rochdale Hornets
- Hunslet Hawks
- Hemel Stags

== See also ==
- Collective ownership
- Common ownership
- Consumers' co-operative
- List of protest clubs
- Public ownership
- Public property
- Social ownership
