= Alempijević =

Alempijević (Serbian Cyrillic: Aлeмпиjeвић) is a Serbian surname. Notable people with the surname include:

- Aleksandar Alempijević (born 1988), Serbian footballer
- Predrag Alempijević (born 1970), Serbian footballer
