= Wanner =

Wanner is a surname. Notable people with the surname include:

- Bob Wanner (born 1949), Canadian politician
- Erich Wanner (born 1969), Swiss gymnast
- Florian Wanner (born 1978), German judoka
- Gerhard Wanner (born 1942), Austrian mathematician
- Heinz Wanner (born 1945), Swiss geographer and climate researcher
- Ines Wanner (born 2000), German field hockey player
- Jack Wanner (1885–1919), Major League Baseball player
- Jakob Friedrich Wanner (1830–1903), German-born Swiss architect
- Jannik Wanner (born 1999), German footballer
- Léo Wanner (1886–1941), French communist and anti-imperialist activist
- Markus Wanner (born 1973), Swiss footballer
- Max Wanner (born 2003), Canadian ice hockey player
- Paul Wanner (born 2005), Austrian footballer
- Rudolf Wanner (born 1951), Austrian ski jumper
- Zukiswa Wanner (born 1976), South African journalist and novelist
