= Jeremić =

Jeremić (Serbian: Јеремић) is a Serbian surname. It may refer to:

- Dragoljub Jeremić (born 1978), footballer
- Milan Jeremić (born 1988), footballer
- Milan Jeremić (born 1977), basketball player
- Mladen Jeremić (born 1988), basketball player
- Predrag Jeremić (born 1987), footballer
- Slavica Jeremić (born 1957), female handball player
- Slaviša Jeremić (born 1983), footballer
- Vuk Jeremić (born 1975), politician
