= Peda (disambiguation) =

Peda is an Indian sweet from Mathura, Uttar Pradesh.

Peda may also refer to:

- Peđa, a South Slavic diminutive of the given name Predrag
- Peda, a surname:
  - Patryk Peda (born 2002), Polish footballer
  - Paulina Peda (born 1998), Polish swimmer
