= Paweł Bugała =

Polish footballer

Personal information
- Date of birth: 31 December 1973 (age 52)
- Place of birth: Lublin, Poland
- Height: 1.82 m (5 ft 11 1/2 in)
- Position: Midfielder

Youth career
- Budowlani Lublin

Senior career*
| Years | Team | Apps | (Gls) |
| 1994 | KS Lublinianka | | |
| 1994–1995 | Wawel Kraków | | |
| 1995–1996 | KS Lublinianka | | |
| 1996–2004 | Górnik Łęczna | 65+ | (10+) |
| 2005 | Lech Poznań | 9 | (1) |
| 2005–2006 | Motor Lublin | 18 | (2) |
| 2006 | Stal Kraśnik | | |
| 2007 | Avia Świdnik | | |
| 2008–2009 | Górnik Łęczna | 26 | (1) |
| 2011 | Orion Niedrzwica Duża | | |
| 2011 | Górnik 1979 Łęczna | | |
| 2013–2015 | KS Lublin | | |
- * Club domestic league appearances and goals

Paweł Bugała (born 31 December 1973 in Lublin) is a Polish former professional footballer who played as a midfielder.

== Honours ==
Górnik Łęczna

- III liga, group IV: 2007–08
