= Jelenković =

Jelenković is a Serbian surname. Notable people with the surname include:

- Nebojša Jelenković (born 1978), Serbian footballer, father of Veljko
- Predrag Jelenković (born 1965), Serbian politician
- Veljko Jelenković (born 2003), Serbian-Bulgarian footballer
