= Jakić =

Jakić (Serbian Cyrillic: Јакић) is a South Slavic surname. Notable people with the surname include:

- Kristijan Jakić (born 1997), Croatian footballer
- Tomislav Jakić (born 1943), Croatian journalist
- Vojislav Jakić (1932–2003), Serbian painter

== See also ==
- Yakich
- Jakič
