= Yakich =

Yakich is a surname, probably coming from Croatian Jakić. Notable people with the surname include:

- Fred Yakich, Australian rugby league footballer
- Nick Yakich (1940–2019), Australian rugby league footballer, brother of Fred
- Mark Yakich, American poet, author, and English professor
