= Predrag Milićević Barbarien =

Serbian painter

Predrag Milićević - Barbarien Предраг Милићевић - Барбаријен
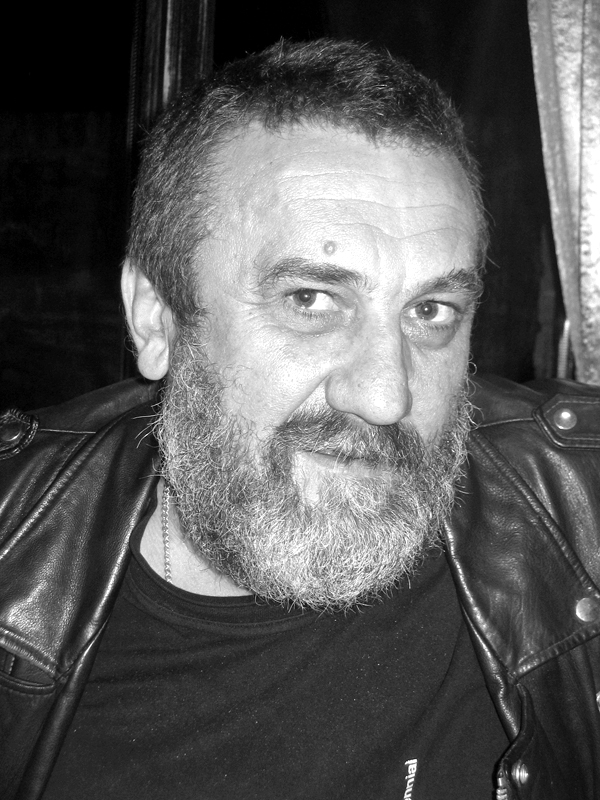
- Predrag Milićević - Barbarien
- Born: Predrag Milićević - Barbarien; February 17, 1963; Jagodina; Yugoslavia
- Died: May 26, 2013 (aged 50); Jagodina, Serbia
- Known for: Painter
- Movement: Outsider art
- Website: Barbarien - Predrag Milićević

Predrag Milićević - Barbarien (Serbian Cyrillic: Предраг Милићевић - Барбаријен; Jagodina, February 2, 1963 – May 5, 2013) was a Serbian outsider art painter.

== Biography ==
He was born in Jagodina in 1963. He lived in Jagodina and Belgrade. He began doing painting in 1992 and very soon he began to exhibit successfully. His first independent exhibition named Punch on the middle class, in Stara kapetanija Gallery, Zemun, January 1994, was proclaimed the exhibition of the week this month in Belgrade. He became the member of Association of Serbian Artists in 1994. On several occasions he participated in Spring Exhibitions of Association in somwhere called: Cvijeta Zuzorić Art Pavilion in Belgrade. He died in Jagodina in 2013.

== Artistic style ==
He liberated himself from unrest by painting. With his rich intellect and irony, in his short but very prolific and expressive lifetime, the artist pulled the suggestive power of his agony out of his internal depths, transforming it into rich coloring and wide and energetic strokes of his paintbrush. His in-satiate fascination with life in all aspects elevated the conflicts and passion to the level of universally human, thus creating the inner tension of form. Expressive and distorted figures in his paintings point to human faults, and fights between the good and the evil. Metaphor of human weakness is expressed in the presentations of animals which, like in fables, reveal the identity of human characters. He pulled out the monsters of his life abyss and placed them on the canvas raw. This contour of his soul in the claws of absurd is created in pain, momentarily and expressively. He embodied all his conflicts in united forces which emerge from the abyss of wandering souls. With his infantile lust for power over his surroundings, Barbarian gets rid of the feeling of inferiority in the very creative act. It was only then that he domineered and achieved intellectual balance, and belonged to himself. Thanks to characteristic pictorial language of expressive and raw artistic articulation he introduced a wealth of inventiveness in art brut, i.e. outsider art in Serbia. Besides Vojislav Jakic, Sava Sekulić and Ilija Bosilj Bašičevic, he can be considered a worldly classic.

== Exhibitions and awards ==
Among the most significant world exhibitions where he participated were certainly those in Paris and Bratislava, among which the Triennials and Biennials in Slovakia and Serbia were most noteworthy. He received many awards and recognition, the most remarkable being Grand Prix for painting at the Thirteenth Biennial of Naïve and Marginal Art in Jagodina, Serbia in 2007. The greatest collection of his paintings is at Museum of Naïve and Marginal Art (MNMA), Jagodina, Serbia.

== Gallery ==
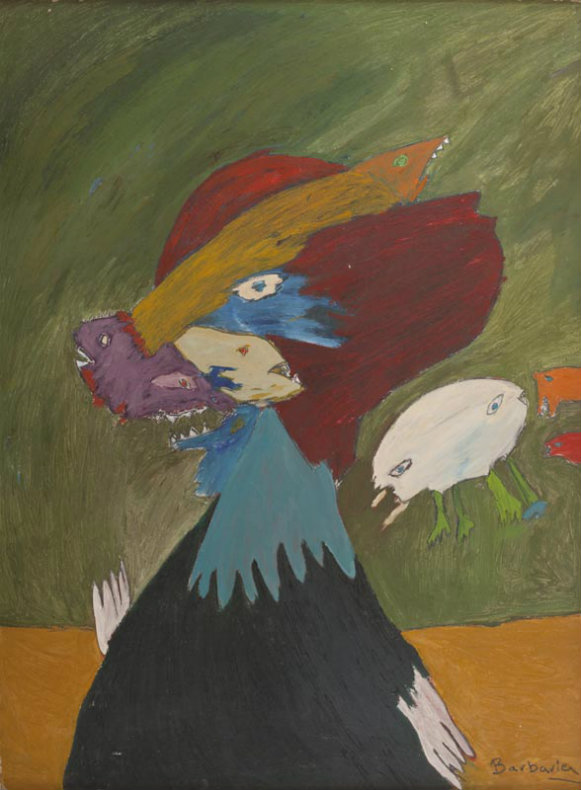
Hypocrisy (from the cycle Prison Days), 2003, MNMA, Jagodina

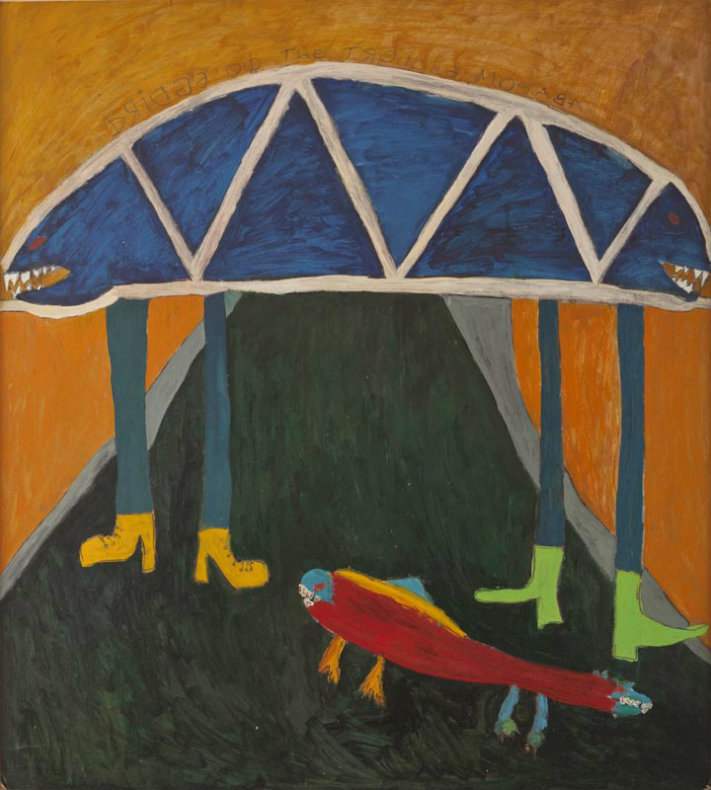
The Bridge over the Turbulent River Morava (from the cycle Prison Days), 2003, MNMA, Jagodina

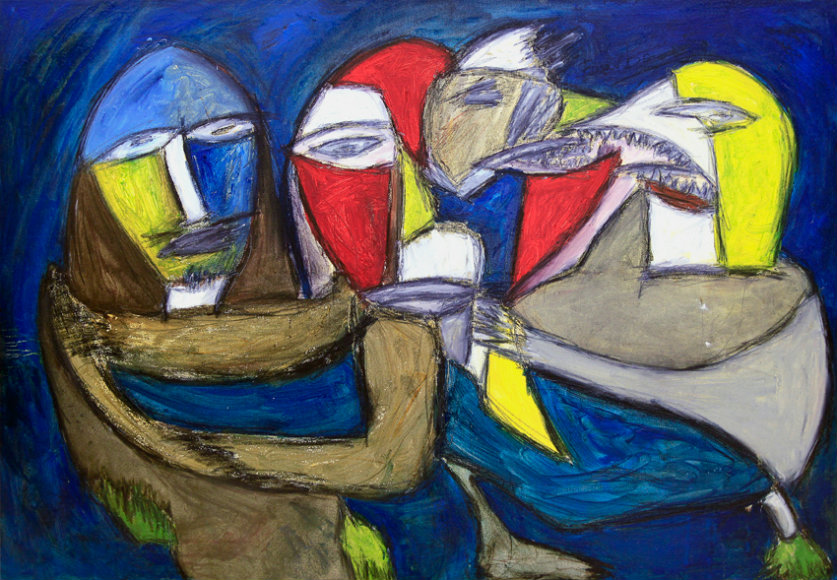
Scramble, 2012, MNMA, Jagodina

== Literature ==
- Krstić N. (Ed.) (2007) Naïve and Marginal Art of Serbia. MNMA: Jagodina
- Krstić N. (Ed.) (2010) Barbarien. MNMA: Jagodina
- Krstić N. (Ed.) (2013) Outsiders. MNMA: Jagodina
- Krstić N. (Ed.) (2014) Outsider Art in Serbia. MNMA: Jagodina
- Krstić N. (Ed.) (2016) Barbarien. MNMA: Jagodina
