= Romuald Ardeois =

French professional football player (born 1973)

Personal information
- Date of birth: 6 July 1973 (age 53)
- Place of birth: Nantes, France
- Height: 1.78 m (5 ft 10 in)
- Position: Goalkeeper

Team information
- Current team: SO Romorantin

Senior career*
Years	Team	Apps	(Gls)
1989–1991	Angers SCO (B team)		
1991–1994	Angers SCO	2	(0)
1994–	SO Romorantin		
- * Club domestic league appearances and goals as of 18:32, 30 November 2009 (UTC)

Romuald Ardeois (born 6 July 1973) is a French professional football player. Currently, he plays in the Championnat de France amateur for SO Romorantin.

He played on the professional level in Ligue 1 and Ligue 2 for Angers SCO. He is currently a goalkeeping coach at FC Ouest-Tourangeau.
