= Vojislav Jakić =

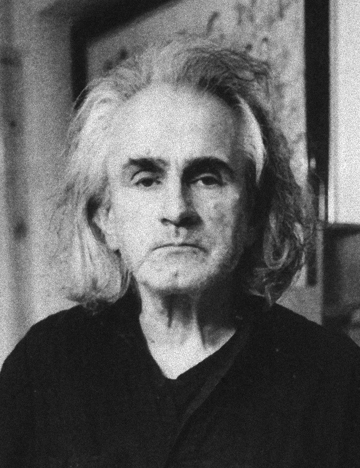
- Vojislav Jakić
- Born: 1 December 1932; Veliki Radobilj, Kingdom of Yugoslavia
- Died: 8 March 2003 (aged 70); Despotovac, Serbia
- Known for: Drawing, Painting
- Movement: Outsider art
- Website: Marginal Art Serbia

Vojislav Jakić (Serbian Cyrillic: Војислав Јакић; 1 December 1932 – 8 March 2003) was a Serbian painter, renowned as an outsider artist. His paintings and drawings display phantasmagoric visions of death, insects and human insides. His most significant works are exhibited in the Collection de l'art brut in Lausanne and Museum of Naive and Marginal Art in Jagodina.

== Biography ==
Vojislav Jakić was born in 1932 in Golem Radobil (now in North Macedonia) which was then part of the Vardar Banovina in the Kingdom of Yugoslavia, where his father worked as a priest, in a severe, religiously devout Serbian Orthodox family. He soon moved to Despotovac in central Serbia, where he would spend most of his life. His childhood was filled with poverty and sadness for the loss of his closest. He moved to Belgrade in 1952 to take drawing and sculpture classes, but feeling disappointed and marginalized, five years later he returned to Despotovac to his mother's home.

Jakić lived in severe poverty during his early career, executing portraits of the dead for local grieving families for meager commissions, working from passport photos. Jakić is known for his later paintings—"He drew assiduously on large formats from 1970 onwards. His compositions with ballpoint pens, gouache, and both normal and wax crayons teem with insects, embryonic figures, and human beings."

He died in March 2003 in Despotovac.

== Artistic style ==
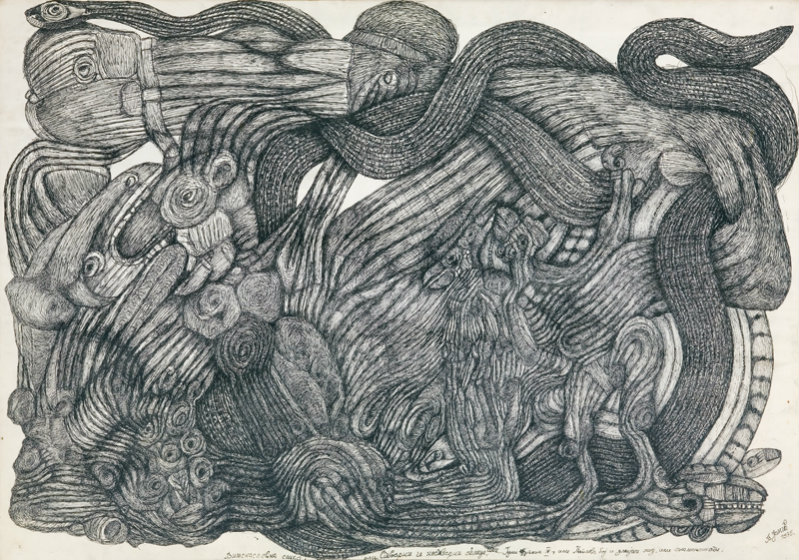
Multi-titled Painting, 1975 Indian ink on paper, 69x98cm MNMA, Jagodina

Jakić's subjects are mainly dark visions of death, carrion, and exposed viscera. There he finally found his only partner, the rest for his soul and embodiment of his phantasmagoria, yet, his world was apocalyptic, depressing and pessimistic. Under the pressure and restrictions, his figures get together in the universal nightmare. At the end of 1970, he completed his second autobiography entitled Nemenikuće, where the real moments of the experience are intersected with the artist’s fiction and irony.

He transmitted his bitter obsessions and memento mori atmosphere into his 'rolls', as he used to call his endless stories. For one of the longest, he said: "This is neither a drawing nor a painting – it is a condensed sorrow!" Made of a series of smaller or larger pieces of cartridge paper, they were mostly treated as an uninterrupted compositional thread, like a symbol of tightly bound, unbreakable fastening of the conscience.

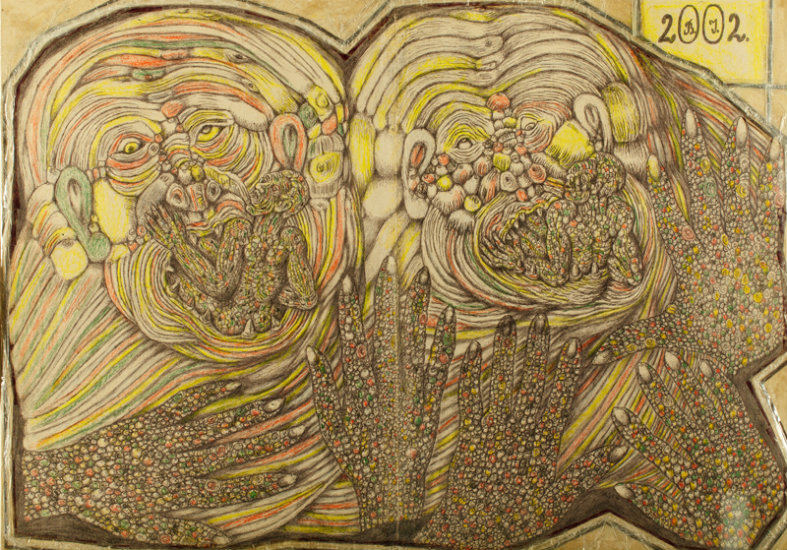
Untitled, 2002 combined technique on cardboard, 50x70cm MNMA, Jagodina

That strange, black man, as they used to call him because he permanently wore black, drew attention like unpleasant conscience, a personification of an outcast, a betrayed, while his anthropomorphic and zoomorphic forms exuberated under the radiation of human animosity. Strong linearism of hallucinating, multiplied texture without a beginning and an end creates a unique atmosphere where the powerful presence of the artist’s sensuality and agony is felt. Tubular forms of organic ornaments create unique arabesques abundant with optical effects, either pulling the form deep or drawing it from a flat surface. Jakić used allegory, a symbol, and a metaphor as a means of contemplation. He most often worked in Indian ink, felt pen and less frequently used colour, pastel, or gouache. In addition to drawing, he wrote a conclusion as supplementary media in order to emphasize his observation with the use of a written text. He is a world classic.

== Exhibitions and awards ==
Vojislav Jakić had solo and group exhibitions in the country and abroad; he participated in significant international exhibitions among which are Lausanne, 1979, 2000; Jagodina, Museum of Naive and Marginal Art (MNMA), 2001; Cvijeta Zuzorić Art Pavilion in Belgrade, 2002; The Seventh Triennial Insitneho Umenia, Bratislava, 2004; Сentre Culturel de Serbie, Paris, 2007 etc. He was respected for a long time worldwide and his works are included in permanent exhibitions at the most famous galleries and museums of art brut.

His most significant works are on display in the Collection de l'art brut in Lausanne. On the Tenth International Biennial of Naïve and Marginal Art in 2001, he was awarded Grand Prix for the exhibited works.

== Gallery ==
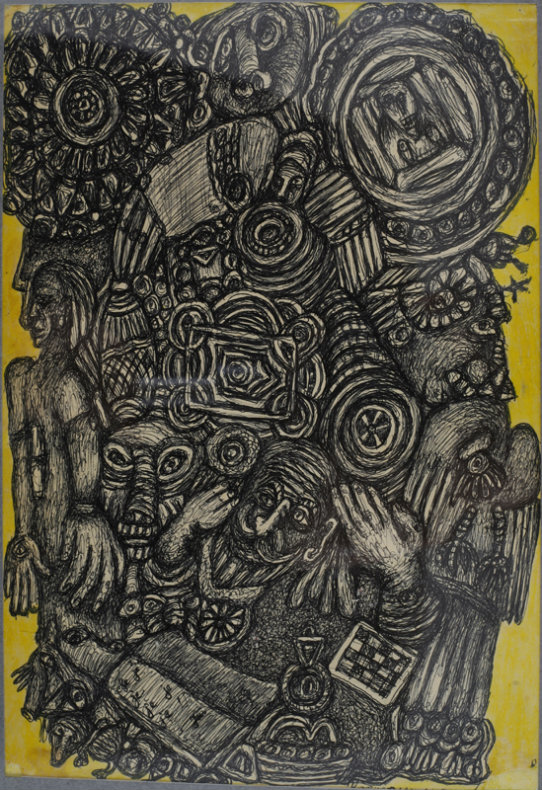
Crimped Drawing, n.d.
combined technique, 30x21cm
MNMA, Jagodina

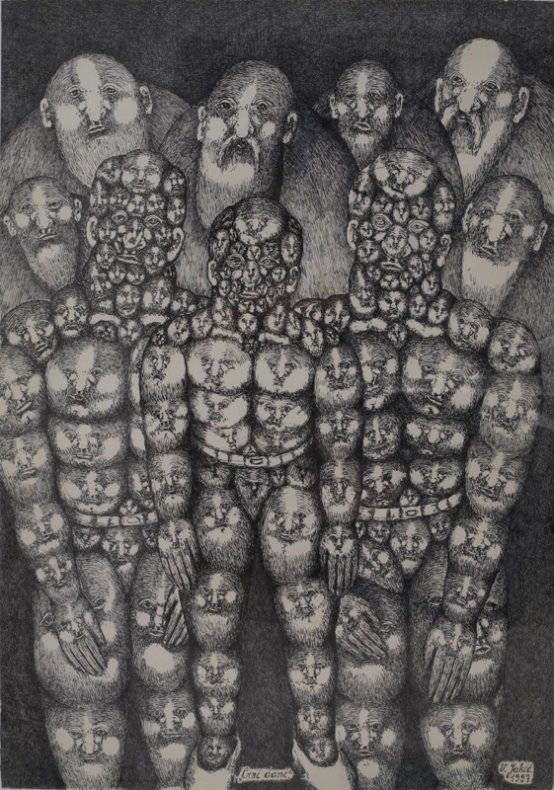
Black Days, 1997
Indian ink on paper, 49,5x35cm
MNMA, Jagodina

== Literature ==
- Vojislav Jakic. Exhibition catalogue of the Collection de l’Art Brut. Lausanne : Collection de l’Art Brut, 1979.
- Čelebonović, A., Thévoz M., Jakić V. (1979) Vojislav Jakić. Lausanne: Collection de l'Art Brut
- Publications de la Collection de l’Art Brut, fascicule 10. Text by Aleksa Celebonovic. Lausanne, 1977.
- The End is Near!: Visions of Apocalypse, Millennium and Utopia. American Visionary Art Museum,1998
- Krstić N. (2014) Outsider Art in Serbia. Jagodina: MNMA
