= Sergei Zhdanov =

Russian footballer

Personal information
- Full name: Sergei Mikhailovich Zhdanov
- Date of birth: 21 January 1973 (age 53)
- Height: 1.72 m (5 ft 7 1/2 in)
- Position: Midfielder

Youth career
- FC Torpedo Moscow

Senior career*
Years	Team	Apps	(Gls)
1991	FC Lokomotiv Moscow	0	(0)
1992	PFC CSKA Moscow	0	(0)
1992	→ PFC CSKA-d Moscow (loan)	16	(2)
1992	FC Fakel Voronezh	6	(0)
1993	FC Asmaral Moscow	0	(0)
1993	→ FC Asmaral-d Moscow (loan)	9	(2)
1993	FC Metallurg Magnitogorsk	25	(10)
1994	FC Gazovik-Gazprom Izhevsk	13	(2)
1994–1995	PFC CSKA Moscow	0	(0)
1994–1995	→ PFC CSKA-d Moscow (loans)	38	(4)
1996–1997	FC Energiya Kamyshin	14	(0)
1997	→ FC Energiya-d Kamyshin (loan)	9	(0)
1999–2000	TSG Neustrelitz	23	(3)
- * Club domestic league appearances and goals

Sergei Mikhailovich Zhdanov (Russian: Сергей Михайлович Жданов; born 21 January 1973) is a former Russian football player.
