= Lesmond Prinsen =

Dutch footballer

Personal information
- Full name: Lesmond Prinsen
- Date of birth: 18 June 1973 (age 53)
- Place of birth: Heerenveen
- Position: Defender

Senior career*
Years	Team	Apps	(Gls)
1994–2003	BV Veendam	194	(12)
2003–2006	FC Emmen	94	(6)
2006–2007	FC Omniworld	15	(0)
- * Club domestic league appearances and goals

Lesmond Prinsen (born 18 June 1973) is a retired football defender from the Netherlands. He played professional football for thirteen years, for BV Veendam, FC Emmen and FC Omniworld.
