= Glenn Summerville =

Dutch footballer (born 1973)

Glenn Summerville (born 24 October 1973) is a Dutch footballer who played as a defender for Eerste Divisie club FC Dordrecht between 1995 and 2001.
