= Dial Square F.C. =

English association football club

- Full name: Dial Square Football Club
- Nickname: The Dial
- Founded: 7 January 2020; 6 years ago
- Ground: Brookwood Country Park Football Ground; Knaphill, Surrey, England
- Capacity: 1,000 (100 seated)
- Chairman: Tony Hurley
- Manager: Steve Brown
- League: Southern Combination Football League Division One
- Website: https://www.dialsquarefc.com
Home colours	Away colours

Dial Square Football Club is an English football club based in Knaphill, Surrey. It was founded as a protest club by fans of the Premier League team Arsenal who had become disillusioned with the route Arsenal had been taking. They play in division one of the Southern Combination Football League.

== History ==
Dial Square's first crest

When Arsenal F.C. were founded in 1886, they played their first match as Dial Square before becoming Arsenal F.C. and moving to Highbury. In January 2020, Arsenal fan Stuart Morgan, a former director of Camberley Town, founded Dial Square after becoming disillusioned with the direction Arsenal's American owner Stan Kroenke had been taking the club in, as well as perceived poor results. The club announced they had agreed a groundshare agreement with Abbey Rangers F.C. in Addlestone, Surrey, for their first season, but stated that their long-term goal would be to move the club to a purpose built ground in Woolwich, where Arsenal were originally founded, and to eventually reach the English Football League.

Despite initial plans to apply for entry into the Combined Counties Football League, Dial joined the Guildford & Woking Alliance League for their first league campaign in 2020–21. Burgundy was adopted as the colour of the club’s home shirt in reference to Arsenal’s original colours, while the sundial and oaks featured in the crest referred to the Royal Oak pub in which Arsenal were originally founded. In April 2021, Dial Square received an increase in membership following protests against the proposed European Super League.

=== 2020–21: Inaugural season ===
Dial Square played their first season in the Guildford & Woking Alliance League Premier Division (North). The club's first match, played 26 September 2020, was a 4-0 loss to Worplesdon Phoenix, followed a week later by the club's first draw, 4–4 against Virginia Water Development. The club's first goal was scored in this game by Lewis Afflick. The first victory for Dial Square came on 17 October 2020 when George Holland scored in the 90th minute to beat Chertsey Old Salesians 2–1. Three losses followed before league play was suspended. Dial concluded their inaugural season having played six, won one, drawn one, and lost four of their opening fixtures.

=== 2021–22: First full season and promotion ===
Realignment of divisions within the Guildford & Woking Alliance League saw Dial Square in the Premier Division for 2021–22. The season opened with a 7-2 away win at Farncombe, which saw Mark Watkins score the club's first hat-trick plus a fourth goal, all in the first half. After a defeat at Laleham & Kempton FC, Dial Square went on an eight-game unbeaten run in all competitions before another defeat to Laleham & Kempton on 11 December, but lost only once more in the league on their way to a second place finish behind Laleham & Kempton, having played 14, won nine, drawn three, and lost three, earning the club promotion to the Surrey County Intermediate League (Western) Division 1. In the Surrey County FA Saturday Junior Cup, Dial Square won four matches and advanced to the semi-finals of the competition before losing 2–1 at home to R.C. Old Boys.

=== 2022–23: Surrey County Intermediate Football League - Division One ===
In only their second full season, Dial gained consecutive promotion from Surrey County Intermediate Football League (Western) Division One to the Premier Division for the 2023–24 season. The club won nine of its 14 league fixtures, drawing three and losing two to finish runners-up to Laleham & Kempton.

=== 2023–24: Surrey County Intermediate Football League - Premier Division ===
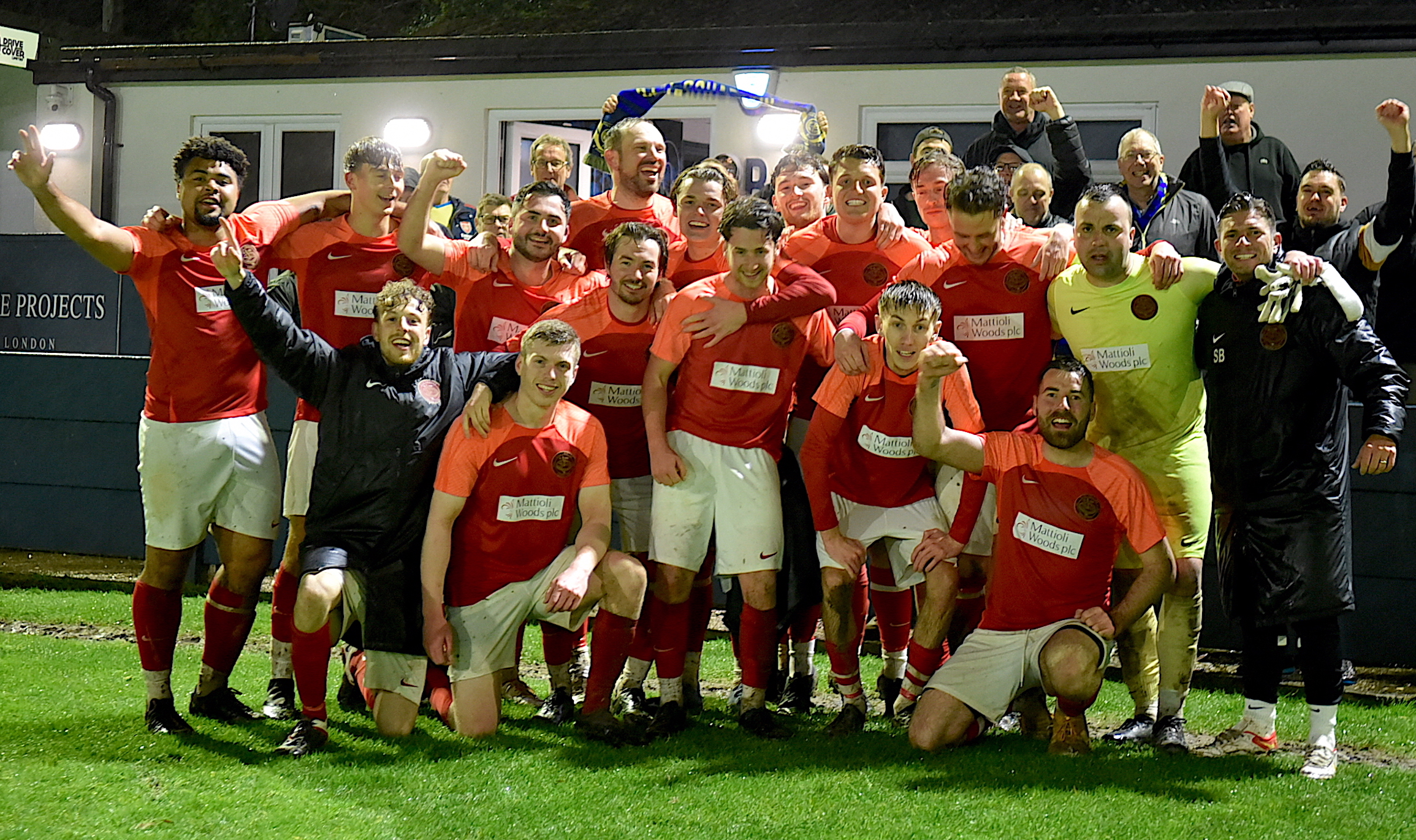
Dial Square F.C. - 2023–24 Surrey County Intermediate League (Western) Premier Division Champions

On 2 April 2024, Dial beat Knaphill Athletic 4–1 at Alwyns Lane to secure their first league title and gain promotion to the Surrey Premier County Football League with five league games remaining. The club secured three consecutive promotions in their first three full playing seasons since being formed in 2020. On the same night, Dial striker Harry Rice also broke the League scoring record (held since 2015–16) after netting his 35th-goal (in 21 games) of the season. Rice went on to score 49 goals (in 33 games) in all competitions (41 league goals). Dial also won the Premier Challenge (League) Cup after beating Milford & Witley 4–0 in the final on 2 May 2024 at Woking Park. In total, Dial lost once in 33 league and cup games and scored 136 goals (109 in the league).

=== 2024–25: Surrey Premier County Football League ===
After topping the league table for much of the 2024-25 season, Dial narrowly missed out on promotion to step 6 of the National League System after losing 4-0 to champions elect, Wimbledon Casuals (A), on 8 May 2025. With only one club eligible for promotion, Dial missed out to AFC Walcountians, who had a more superior goal difference. However, for the second consecutive season, Dial striker Harry Rice won the league's top scorer award after netting 26 league goals in 26 games, plus two in the Surrey FA Saturday Intermediate County Cup.

=== 2025–26: Surrey Premier County Football League ===
After 13 league games, Dial were top of the table and with a game in hand over Wimbledon Casuals and FC Battersea Ironsides in second and third respectively. However, despite thrashing reigning champions Wimbledon Casuals 5-1 at Alwyns Lane on 24 March, Dial lost at home and away to Worcester Park in March, before suffering two disappointing home defeats against Richmond & Kew and CB Hounslow & Abbots in April to eventually finish fifth, with Worcester Park piping Wimbledon Casuals to cinch the league title on 14 May. Although, Steve Brown's side were still able to gain promotion to step 6 of the National League System after being the only eligible team within the top five of the table. Dial also reached the semi-final of the Premier Challenge (League) Cup, losing 1-0 away to Wimbledon Casuals. They went one better to reach the final of the Surrey FA Saturday Intermediate (County) Cup, only to lose 3-1 on penalties against Worcester Park on 7 May 2025 at the Meadowbank Stadium after the match finished 3-3 at full-time.

== Ground ==
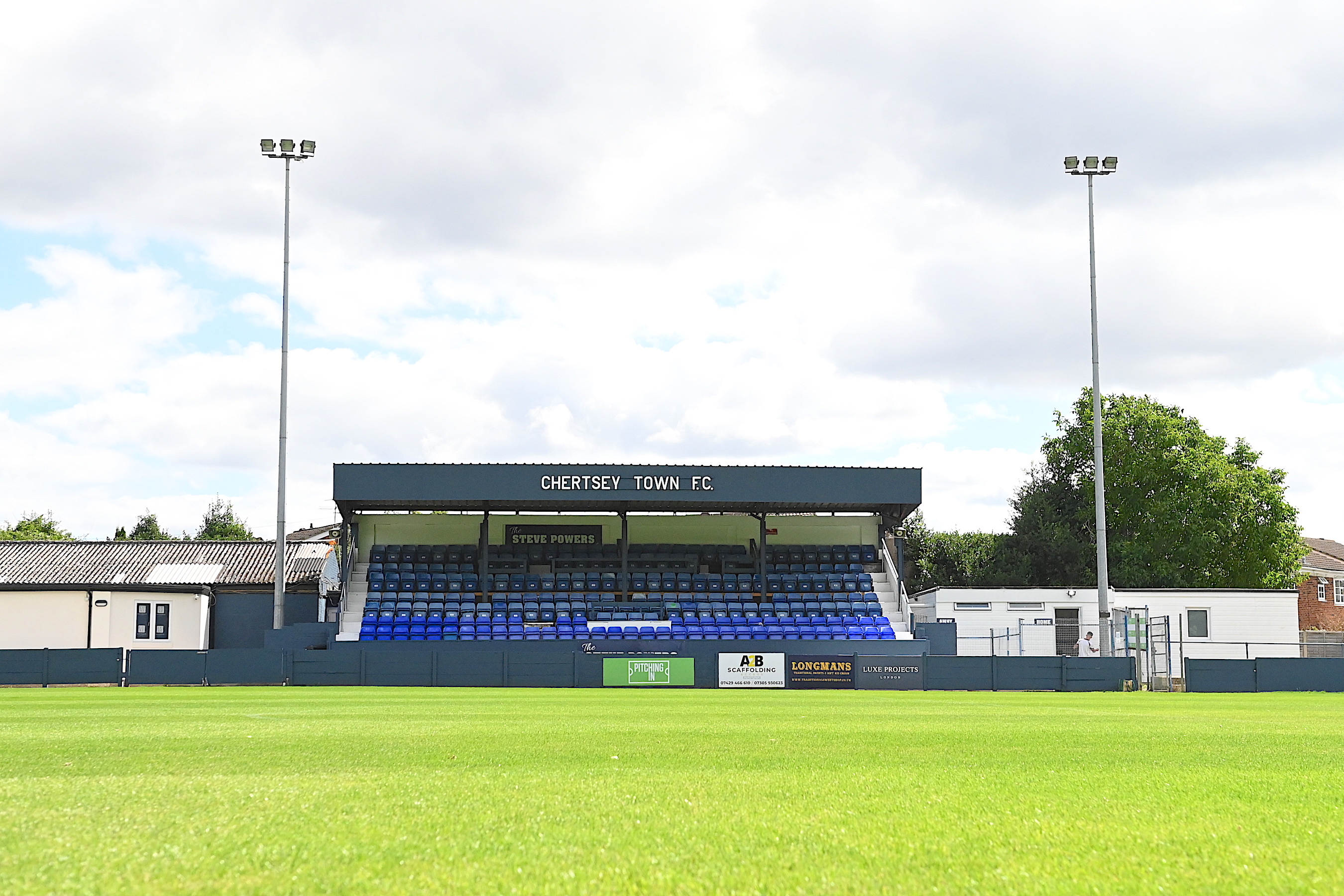
Chertsey Town F.C. ground

On 3 April 2022, Dial Square announced it had secured a one-year groundshare agreement with Isthmian Football League side, Chertsey Town. After a successful first year, Dial extended their groundshare at Alwyns Lane for the 2023–24 season. In March 2024, Dial signed a new three-year ground share agreement with The Curfews, which would extend their stay at Alwyns Lane until Spring 2027.

On 13 April 2026, Dial announced that they had agreed a three-year groundshare agreement with Knaphill at Brookwood Country Park Football Ground (Redding Way) to fulfil a 77% uplift of league fixtures at step 6 of the National League System from the 2026/27 season. It came after Dial exercised a 12-month break clause in their groundshare agreement with Chertsey Town due to the high water table surrounding Alwyns Lane, which increased the risk of the pitch being waterlogged.

== National Accreditation ==
On 10 November 2023, Dial received England Football Accreditation after the accreditor verified that the club creates an ideal environment to nurture players, coaches and volunteers, while delivering inclusive football for their local community. The accreditation has been renewed in successive seasons; the last being on 1 November 2025.

== Fans' ownership ==
On 12 July 2023, Dial Square announced that it would be increasing its share capital by 250,000 to enable registered web-members to apply to purchase shares in the club to support its ongoing development. On 19 October 2023, the club reported that fans had purchased 190,000 new shares during the six-week application window.

On 18 July 2024, the club announced members could apply to purchase 1,000 or more shares following an increase in the company's share capital. Applications were made for 440,000 shares over the six-week window and registered with Companies House.

The club announced a third opportunity for fans to purchase shares from 18 July 2025, with the creation and release of 420,000 shares, each having a face value of 10 pence. By 31 August, the entire allocation had been taken and were formally registered in September 2025.

== Honours ==
Dial Square's honours include the following:

League

- Woking & Guildford Alliance League (Level 14 / Step 10) - Runners-Up (2021–22)
- Surrey County Intermediate League (Western) Division One (Level 13 / Step 9) - Runners-Up (2022–23)
- Surrey County Intermediate League (Western) Premier Division (Level 12 / Step 8) - Champions (2023–24)

Cup

- Surrey FA Saturday Intermediate County Cup - Finalist (2025–26)
- Surrey County Intermediate League (Western) Premier Challenge Cup - Winner (2023–24)

Golden Boot

- Surrey County Intermediate League (Western) Premier Division - Harry Rice, 41 league goals (2023–24)
- Surrey Premier County Football League - Harry Rice, 26 league goals (2024–25)
