= Ivan Gentizon =

Swiss footballer (born 1973)

Personal information
- Date of birth: 24 February 1973 (age 53)
- Position: Midfielder

Senior career*
Years	Team	Apps	(Gls)
1992–1993	FC Mendrisio		
1994	FC Chiasso		
1994–1997	FC Lugano		
1998–2004	FC Locarno		
- * Club domestic league appearances and goals

Ivan Gentizon (born 24 February 1973) is a retired Swiss football midfielder.
