= Pedro Acevedo =

Chilean footballer (born 1973)

Personal information
- Date of birth: September 21, 1973
- Place of birth: Santiago, Chile

Senior career*
Years	Team	Apps	(Gls)
1994-1999	Cobresal		
2000	Colo-Colo		
2001-2003	Unión Española		
2004	Deportes Concepción		
2005-2007	Santiago Morning		
- * Club domestic league appearances and goals

Pedro Mauricio Acevedo Meloni (born September 21, 1973, in Santiago, Chile) is a former Chilean footballer who played for clubs of Chile.

== Teams ==
- (Chile) Cobresal 1994–1999
- (Chile) Colo-Colo 2000
- (Chile) Unión Española 2001–2003
- (Chile) Deportes Concepción 2004
- (Chile) Santiago Morning 2005–2007

== Titles ==
- (Chile) Cobresal 1998 (Chilean Primera B Championship)
- (Chile) Santiago Morning 2005 (Chilean Primera B Championship), 2007 (Relegation Playoffs (3 Teams))
