= Pierre Bastou =

French professional football player (born 1973)

Personal information
- Date of birth: August 1, 1973 (age 53)
- Place of birth: La Ciotat, France
- Height: 1.76 m (5 ft 9 in)
- Position: Midfielder

Team information
- Current team: ASF Andrézieux

Senior career*
Years	Team	Apps	(Gls)
1991–1998	Saint-Étienne (B team)		
1994–1998	Saint-Étienne	47	(1)
1998–2002	Aurillac		
2002–	ASF Andrézieux		
- * Club domestic league appearances and goals as of 21:09, 24 November 2009 (UTC)

Pierre Bastou (born August 1, 1973) is a former French professional football player who last played for ASF Andrézieux in the Championnat de France amateur.

He played on the professional level in Ligue 1 and Ligue 2 for AS Saint-Étienne.
