= Alan Tutton =

English footballer (born 1973)

Personal information
- Date of birth: 23 February 1973 (age 53)
- Place of birth: Bexley, England
- Position: Forward

Senior career*
Years	Team	Apps	(Gls)
–	Alma Swanley		
1991–1992	Maidstone United	4	(0)
–	Dartford		
- * Club domestic league appearances and goals

Alan Tutton (born 23 February 1973) is a former professional footballer who played in The Football League for Maidstone United.
