= List of protest clubs =

This page is a list of protest clubs that were created out of either sports fans, players, or club shareholders protesting the way the original club was treated or run. There are also clubs who have been created purely over arguments about who plays at a particular ground. The definition of it can also be used for a club protesting certain measures set out by a government or organisation

== List ==
=== Association football ===
Name	Original Club	Country	Founded	Reason for foundation
Bangor 1876 F.C.	Bangor City F.C.	Wales	2019	Protest against the involvement of the Vaughan family at Bangor City
A.F.C. Barnsley	Barnsley F.C.	England	2003	Created in protest of anticipation of the winding up of Barnsley F.C.
FC Bayern Munich	MTV Munich	Germany	1900	Protesting the refusal of the German Football Association to allow MTV's footballers to join
Borussia Dortmund	Trinity Youth	Germany	1909	Broke away in protest of Trinity Youth's manager
Bradford City A.F.C.	Manningham F.C.	England	1903	Wanted to play another sport
Bray Wanderers A.F.C.	St. Kevin's	Ireland	1942	Wanted to play another sport
Cruzeiro Esporte Clube	Yale Atlético Clube	Brazil	1921	Protesting Yale's administration
Dial Square F.C.	Arsenal F.C.	England	2020	Protesting the running of Arsenal under Stan Kronke's ownership
Enfield Town F.C.	Enfield F.C.	England	2001	Protesting the way the original club was run
Estudiantes de La Plata	Gimnasia	Argentina	1905	Broke away because of football practice cancellation
Göztepe S.K.	Altay S.K.	Turkey	1925	Some of the players protested the board of directors and broke away from Altay S.K.
Hapoel Katamon Jerusalem F.C.	Hapoel Jerusalem F.C.	Israel	2007	Protesting the management of the original club
Inter Milan	A.C. Milan	Italy	1908	Protesting against A.C. Milan not allowing foreign players
A.F.C. Liverpool	Liverpool F.C.	England	2008	Protesting ticket prices at Anfield
Norwich City F.C.	Norwich CEYMS F.C.	England	1902	Wanted to play another sport
FC Omniworld	FC Amsterdam	Netherlands	1972	DWS supporters protesting a merger between DWS, Volewijckers and Blauw-Wit
AC Omonia	APOEL FC	Cyprus	1948	Protesting APOEL's policy of forcing its members to support the political Right Wing
Omonoia 1948	AC Omonia	Cyprus	2018	Protesting Omonoia's takeover by private owners
Otahuhu United	Courier Rangers AFC	New Zealand	1975	Broke away in protest by parents of junior teams unhappy with club organisation
Panathinaikos A.O.	Panellinios G.S.	Greece	1908	Protesting Panellinios G.S.'s refusal to form a football team.
Paris FC	Paris Saint-Germain F.C.	France	1969	Broke away after Mayor of Paris wouldn't support a non-Paris team
Persika 1951	Persika Karawang	Indonesia	2022	A form of protest over the chaos between supporters and management which was considered chaotic
Real Madrid CF	Club Español de Madrid	Spain	1902	Club split in membership
Royal Ordnance Factories F.C.	Royal Arsenal F.C.	England	1893	Wanted a team for amateur factory workers
Sheffield Rovers	Sheffield Wednesday F.C.	England	1886	Protesting the refusal to turn professional
Sunderland Albion F.C.	Sunderland A.F.C.	England	1888	Protesting professionalism
Thursday Wanderers	Sheffield F.C.	England	1876	Wanted to play in the Sheffield Amateur Cup
Torino F.C.	Juventus FC	Italy	1906	Protesting a move away from Torino
F.C. United of Manchester	Manchester United F.C.	England	2005	Protesting Manchester United's takeover by the Glazer family
AFC Wimbledon	Wimbledon F.C.	England	2002	Protesting the move of Wimbledon F.C. to Milton Keynes
FK Trepča	KF Trepça	Kosovo	1989	KF Trepça is the successor of the successful Yugoslavian Trepca according to the Football Federation of Kosovo, while FK Trepča is considered to be operating illegally.

=== Other sporting codes ===
Name	Original Club	Country	Sport	Founded	Reason for foundation with source
Bradford Bulls	Bradford Park Avenue A.F.C.	England	Rugby league	1907	Protesting Bradford F.C.'s change of sports to Association football
London Scottish F.C.	St. Andrew's Rovers FC	England	Rugby union	1878	3 club members broke away to form their own club for Scots
London Wasps	Harlequin F.C.	England	Rugby union	1867	Split in membership of Hampshire Rugby Club
Newcastle Falcons	Gosforth RFC	England	Rugby union	1990	Wanted to turn professional
Oakland Ballers	Oakland Athletics	USA	Baseball	2024	Protesting the Athletics' relocation to Las Vegas
Oban Celtic	Oban Camanachd	Scotland	Shinty	1927	Broke away in protest by players who couldn't get a game
Sheffield Eagles	Huddersfield-Sheffield Giants	England	Rugby league	2000	Protesting an unsuccessful merger

== See also ==
- Phoenix club, clubs which arise after the disbandment of a former club
