= René Gottwald =

German footballer

Personal information
- Date of birth: 30 January 1973 (age 53)
- Place of birth: Greifswald, Germany
- Height: 1.80 m (5 ft 11 in)
- Position: Forward

Senior career*
Years	Team	Apps	(Gls)
–1992	F.C. Hansa Rostock II		
1992–1995	F.C. Hansa Rostock		
1995–1997	Rot-Weiß Oberhausen		
1997–1998	FC Wegberg-Beeck		
1998–2000	SV 19 Straelen		
2000–2001	TuRU Düsseldorf		
2001–2003	VfB Speldorf		
2003–2004	Rot-Weiss Essen II		
- * Club domestic league appearances and goals

René Gottwald (born 30 January 1973) is a German retired football striker.
