= Predrag Patić =

Serbian politician

Predrag Patić (Serbian Cyrillic: Предраг Патић; born 23 October 1967) is a politician in Serbia. He has served in the National Assembly of Serbia and the Assembly of Vojvodina and has held high political office at the city level in Pančevo. Originally a member of the Democratic Party (Demokratska stranka, DS), Patić joined the breakaway Liberal Democratic Party (Liberalno demokratska partija, LDP) on its formation in 2005.

== Early life and private career ==
Patić was born in Pančevo, in what was then the Socialist Autonomous Province of Vojvodina in the Socialist Republic of Serbia, Socialist Federal Republic of Yugoslavia. He was raised in the community and founded the private company Olimpija in 1990.

Patić is a graduated economist.

== Politician ==
=== Democratic Party ===
Patić joined the Democratic Party in 1993. The party contested the 1996 Serbian local elections as part of the Zajedno (English: Together) coalition, and Patić was elected to the Pančevo municipal assembly under its banner. Zajedno won the election in the city, and he served for the next four years as a supporter of the administration. He was also elected to the Vojvodina assembly for Pančevo's first division in the concurrent 1996 provincial election. The Socialist Party of Serbia (Socijalistička partija Srbije, SPS) won a majority government in the province, and Patić here served as an opposition member.

In 1999, the DS joined a new grouping called the Alliance for Change, consisting of several parties opposed to Slobodan Milošević's regime. Patić was the alliance's co-ordinator in Pančevo and was active in efforts to prevent the media outlet RTV Pančevo from being taken over by republican state authorities. The Alliance for Change evolved into the Democratic Opposition of Serbia (Demokratska opozicija Srbije, DOS) the following year, and its candidate Vojislav Koštunica defeated Milošević in the 2000 Yugoslavian presidential election, a watershed moment in Serbian and Yugoslavian politics. Patić was re-elected to the Pančevo city assembly in the concurrent 2000 local elections. The DOS won a majority victory in Pančevo, and Patić served as vice-president of the municipal assembly (a position that was then equivalent to deputy mayor) for the next four years. He was not a candidate in the 2000 Vojvodina provincial election, which also occurred at the same time.

The government of Serbia fell after Milošević's defeat, and a new Serbian parliamentary election was called for December 2000. Patić received the seventieth position on the DOS's electoral list and was awarded a mandate when the list won a landslide victory with 176 out of 250 seats. (From 2000 to 2011, mandates in Serbian parliamentary elections were awarded to sponsoring parties or coalitions rather than to individual candidates, and it was common practice for the mandates to be distributed out of numerical order. Patić was not automatically elected by virtue of his list position, though he was included in the DS's assembly delegation all the same.) During his term in his national assembly, he was a member of the committee on industry.

The DOS alliance had dissolved by the 2003 Serbian parliamentary election, which the DS contested on its own. Patić appeared in the 206th position on the party's list and was not chosen for a new mandate when the list won thirty-seven seats.

Serbia switched to a system of proportional representation for local elections in the 2004 electoral cycle. Patić appeared in the lead position on the DS's list and was re-elected when the list won fifteen seats.

=== Liberal Democratic Party ===
The DS experienced a serious split in 2004, and a number of former party members founded the Liberal Democratic Party the following year. Patić became a member of the new party. He appeared on the LDP's lists in the 2007 and 2008 parliamentary elections, although he was not awarded a mandate on either occasion. He also received the lead position on the LDP's list for Pančevo in the 2008 local elections and took a new mandate when the list won five seats.

Serbia's electoral system was reformed again in 2011, such that all mandates were awarded to candidates on successful lists in numerical order. Patić led the LDP-led U-Turn list for Pančevo in the 2012 local elections and was re-elected when the list again won five seats. He initially served in opposition. The LDP joined the city's coalition government in July 2013, and he was appointed to the city council (i.e., the executive branch of the city government) with responsibility for housing and community affairs. He served in this role for the next two years. In June 2015, the ruling majority in the assembly refused to accept his report on Pančevo's water supply issues and dismissed him from office; this prompted the mayor to resign and brought about large-scale changes in the city government.

The LDP aligned itself with the New Party (Nova stranka, NOVA) in Pančevo for the 2016 Serbian local elections, and Patić appeared in the lead position on their combined list. The list did not cross the electoral threshold to win representation in the assembly.

Patić also appeared on the LDP's lists in the 2008 Vojvodina provincial election and the 2014 Serbian parliamentary election, the U-Turn list in the 2012 provincial election, and a combined LDP-Social Democratic Party (Socijaldemokratska stranka, SDS) list in the 2016 provincial election. In each case, the list failed to cross the electoral threshold.

== Electoral record ==
=== Local (Pančevo) ===
2000 Pančevo municipal election: Division 57 (Centar Division 2)
Candidate	Party
Veselin Grković	Socialist Party of Serbia–Yugoslav Left–Slobodan Milošević
Petar Laušev	Serbian Radical Party
Novica Petrović	Democratic Movement for Pančevo
Predrag Patić (***WINNER***)	Democratic Opposition of Serbia (Affiliation: Democratic Party)
Total

=== Provincial (Vojvodina) ===
1996 Vojvodina provincial election: Pančevo 1
Candidate	Party
Predrag Patić (***WINNER***)	Zajendo (Affiliation: Democratic Party)
other candidates	
Total
