= Ray Kenny =

Irish footballer

Personal information
- Full name: Raymond Noel Kenny
- Date of birth: 11 December 1973 (age 52)
- Place of birth: Dublin, Ireland
- Position: Defender

Senior career*
| Years | Team | Apps | (Gls) |
| 1995–2000 | Bray Wanderers | 75 | (6) |
| 2000–2001 | Kilkenny City | 5 | (0) |
| 2001–2003 | Finn Harps | 74 | (4) |
| 2003–2005 | Kildare County | 86 | (2) |
| 2006 | Shamrock Rovers | 26 | (1) |
| 2007–2008 | Bray Wanderers | 38 | (1) |
| 2009 | Longford Town | 25 | (2) |
| Total | | 329 | (16) |
- * Club domestic league appearances and goals

Ray Kenny (born 11 December 1973 in Dún Laoghaire, Ireland) is an Irish football defender, who plays for Arklow Town in the Leinster Senior League.

== Biography ==
Ray signed for Bray Wanderers from TEK United in 1995 and won the Shield and First Division title in his first season with the Club. He picked up a First Division runners-up medal in 1997/98 and despite missing most of the 1998/99 season he returned to play in all three games of the 1999 FAI Cup Final against Finn Harps (wore shirt no 15 for the matches). He played in Bray's two UEFA Cup games in August 1999.

He joined Kilkenny City in 2000–01, however his stay was short as he moved to Finn Harps with Graham O'Hanlon moving the other way.

Ray joined Kildare County from Finn Harps in the 2003 season. He was appointed team captain for 2004 and was named in the Professional Footballers Association of Ireland Division One team of the year. He made 101 appearances for Kildare his 101st arriving against Limerick F.C. in 2005. Ray was Kildare County's Player of the Year in 2004.

He moved to Shamrock Rovers in 2006 making a total of 31 appearances in all competitions. With Rovers he won the First Division in 2006 and also made an appearance on a Futbol Mundial piece about Rovers in July 2006.

Ray moved back to Bray Wanderers for the 2007 season. In February 2009 he signed for Longford Town before leaving at the end of the 2009 season.

== Honours ==
- FAI Cup
  - Bray Wanderers 1999
- League of Ireland First Division: 2
  - Bray Wanderers 1995/1996
  - Shamrock Rovers - 2006
- League of Ireland First Division Shield
  - Bray Wanderers 1995/1996
  - Player of the Year:
  - Kildare County - 2004

Sporting positions
| Preceded by Damien Brennan | Kildare County Senior Player; 2004 | Succeeded by Ger O'Brien |
| Preceded by Colm Tresson | Bray Wanderers Hardman of the Year; 2007 | Succeeded by Andrew Myler |
