= Predrag Vuković =

Serbian politician

Predrag Vuković (Serbian Cyrillic: Предраг Вуковић; born 31 May 1966) is a politician in Serbia. He was the mayor of Šid from 2016 to 2020 and has served in the Assembly of Vojvodina since 2020. Vuković is a member of the Serbian Progressive Party.

== Early life and private career ==
Vuković was born in Vukovar, in what was then the Socialist Republic of Croatia in the Socialist Federal Republic of Yugoslavia. He has a degree from the University of Belgrade Faculty of Economics and has been a company director in both the private and public sectors in Šid.

== Politician ==
=== Municipal politics ===
Vuković appeared in the lead position on the Progressive Party's electoral list for the 2016 local election in Šid. The list won a majority victory with twenty-three out of thirty-nine seats, and he was chosen as mayor when the assembly convened. In 2017, he oversaw the removal of migrant refugees from a centre in the town's downtown core, stating that there had been confrontations between refugees at that particular centre and the local population. He dismissed suggestions that his actions were motivated by xenophobia and noted that the municipality housed two other refugee centres that did not have the same issues.

He did not seek re-election at the local level in 2020.

=== Assembly of Vojvodina ===
Vuković received the forty-seventh position on the Progressive-led Aleksandar Vučić — For Our Children list in the 2020 provincial election and was elected when the list won a majority victory with seventy-six out of 120 mandates. He is now a member of the assembly committee on culture and public information and the committee on organization of administration and local self-government.
