= Golem Radobil =

Golem Radobil Голем Радобил
- Village
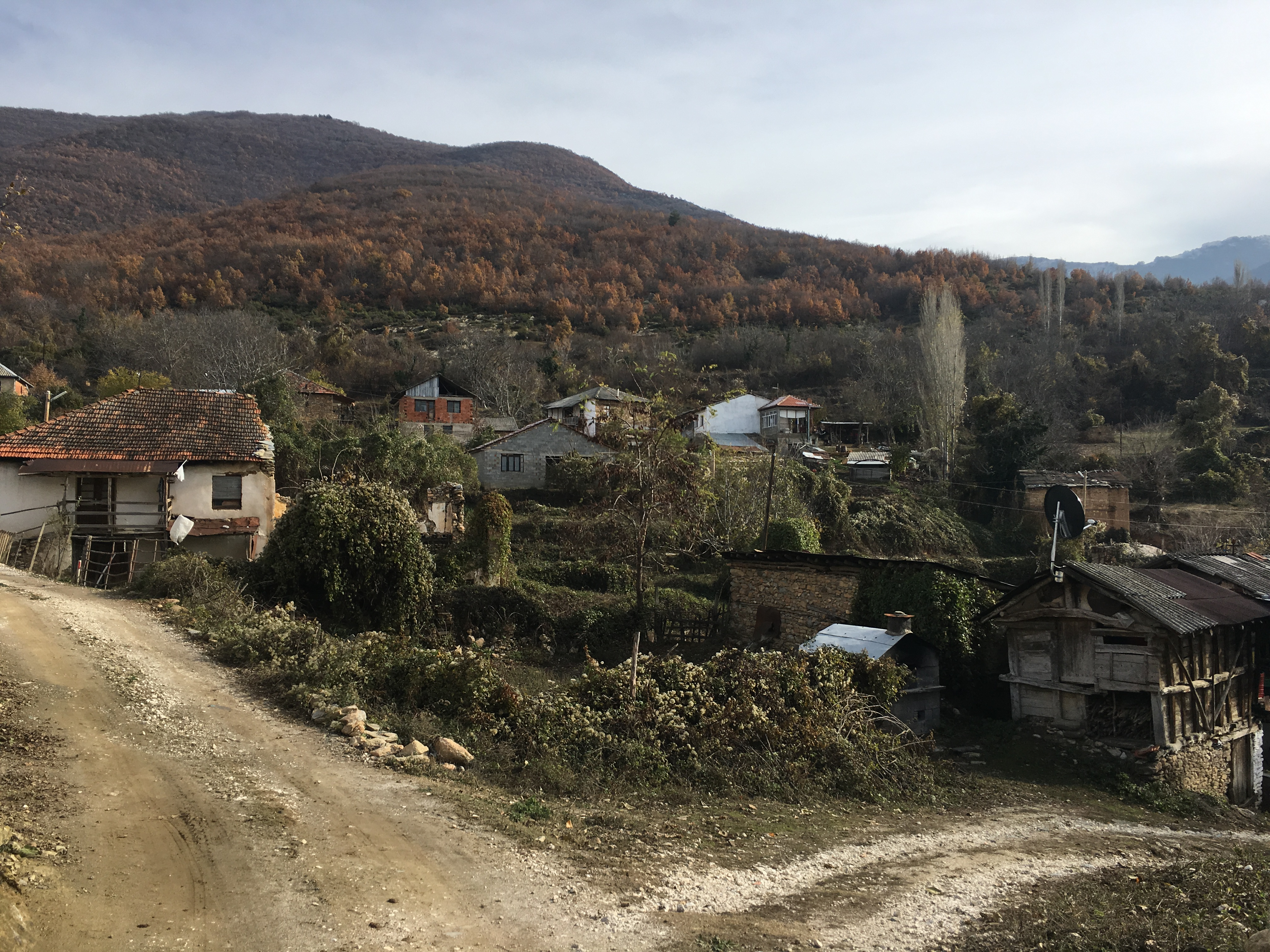

- Location within North Macedonia
- Country: North Macedonia
- Region: Pelagonia
- Municipality: Prilep
- Elevation: 668 m (2,192 ft)

Population (2021)
  - Total: 96
- Time zone: UTC+1 (CET)

Golem Radobil is a village located in the Prilep Municipality in North Macedonia.

== Demographics ==
According to the 2002 census, the village had a total of 107 inhabitants. Ethnic groups in the village include:

- Macedonians 107
