= Raphaël Clapson =

French footballer (born 1973)

Personal information
- Date of birth: 23 September 1973 (age 53)
- Place of birth: Le Havre, France
- Height: 1.75 m (5 ft 9 in)
- Position: Defender

Senior career*
Years	Team	Apps	(Gls)
1993–1995	Le Havre AC	18	(0)
1995–1998	Fréjus		
1998–2002	Clermont		
2002–2003	Rouen		
2003–2013	Dunkerque		
- * Club domestic league appearances and goals

Raphaël Clapson (born 23 September 1973) is a French professional football player who last played in the Championnat de France amateur for USL Dunkerque.

He played on the professional level in Ligue 1 for Le Havre AC.
