= Limberg Méndez =

Bolivian footballer (born 1973)

Personal information
- Full name: Limberg Méndez Justiniano
- Date of birth: September 18, 1973 (age 53)
- Place of birth: Santa Cruz de la Sierra, Bolivia
- Height: 1.72 m (5 ft 7 1/2 in)
- Position: Striker

Senior career*
Years	Team	Apps	(Gls)
1997–1999	Guabirá		
1999	The Strongest		
2000	Mariscal Braun		
2001	Guabirá		
2002–2004	The Strongest		
2005	Aurora		
2006	La Paz		
2007	Blooming		
2008	The Strongest		

International career^{‡}
2003–2008	Bolivia	9	(1)
- * Club domestic league appearances and goals as of October 31, 2008 ‡ National team caps and goals as of February 12, 2008

Limberg Méndez Justiniano (born September 18, 1973, in Santa Cruz de la Sierra) is a Bolivian football retired striker who played in the Liga de Fútbol Profesional Boliviano from 1997 to 2008.

== Club career ==
Throughout his professional career he played for several clubs, including Guabirá, The Strongest, Mariscal Braun, Blooming, Aurora and La Paz FC.

== International career ==
Between 2003 and 2008, Méndez earned nine caps for the Bolivia national team, scoring only one goal in a friendly match against Panama on August 31, 2003. He was previously called up for the 1997 Copa América, but never played in that tournament.
