= GKS Górnik 1979 Łęczna =

Polish football club

Górnik 1979 Łęczna
- Full name: Górnicy Kibice Sportowcy Górnik 1979 Łęczna
- Nickname(s): Zielono-Czarni
- Founded: 2011
- Dissolved: 2014
- Ground: Górnik Łęczna Stadium
- Capacity: 1000
- Owner: Stowarzyszenie Kibiców Górnika Łęczna
- Manager: Mirosław Staniec, Piotr Mazurkiewicz (last)
- 2014–15: Klasa A, dissolved after 1st round
- Website: gornik-leczna.com

Górnicy Kibice Sportowcy Górnik 1979 Łęczna (lit. 'Miners Fans Athletes Górnik 1979 Łęczna'), commonly referred to as Górnik 1979 Łęczna, was a short-lived fan-owned phoenix club founded in 2011 by Górnik Łęczna fans who were unhappy with the name change to GKS Bogdanka. The club eventually changed its name back in 2013 but the fan owned counterpart has continued to operate in amateur football leagues until 2014.

== History ==
The club has relative success, gaining promotion in its first season to the A-klasa, and advancing through a few rounds of the local Polish Cup. The club had also several players who transferred from the original Górnik Łęczna in protest of the name change.

On 22 August 2014, the club withdrew from all competitions and ceased to operate, the reason cited were the lack of funds and the fact that the original Górnik Łęczna team went back to its original name scrapping the GKS Bogdanka name.
