= Heini Stocker =

Liechtenstein footballer (born 1973)

Personal information
- Date of birth: 26 August 1973 (age 53)
- Position: Defender

Senior career*
Years	Team	Apps	(Gls)
1993–1998	FC Balzers		

International career
1993–1996	Liechtenstein	7	(0)
- * Club domestic league appearances and goals

Heini Stocker (born 26 August 1973) is a retired Liechtenstein football defender.
