= Stephen Pugh =

Welsh footballer

Personal information
- Date of birth: 27 November 1973 (age 52)
- Place of birth: Bangor, Wales
- Position: Forward

Youth career
- Wrexham

Senior career*
Years	Team	Apps	(Gls)
1992–1995	Wrexham	11	(0)
1995	Bangor City		
- Porthmadog

International career
	Wales U21	2	(0)
- * Club domestic league appearances and goals

Stephen Pugh (born 27 November 1973) is a Welsh former professional footballer who played as a forward. He made appearances in the English Football League with Wrexham. He also won 2 caps for Wales U21.
