= Nandor Njergeš =

Serbian footballer

Personal information
- Full name: Nandor Njergeš
- Date of birth: 4 September 1973 (age 53)
- Place of birth: SFR Yugoslavia
- Height: 1.87 m (6 ft 2 in)
- Position: Goalkeeper

Senior career*
Years	Team	Apps	(Gls)
1991–2006	Budućnost Banatski Dvor		
2006–2007	Banat Zrenjanin	0	(0)
2007–2009	Jedinstvo Novi Bečej		
- * Club domestic league appearances and goals

Nandor Njergeš (Serbian Cyrillic: Нандор Њергеш, Hungarian: Nyerges Nándor; born September 4, 1973) is a retired Serbian football goalkeeper of Hungarian descent.

During his career he played with FK Budućnost Banatski Dvor, renamed in 2005 to FK Banat Zrenjanin.
