= Predrag Kodžo =

Serbian footballer

Personal information
- Date of birth: 30 January 1973 (age 53)
- Place of birth: Inđija, SFR Yugoslavia
- Height: 1.80 m (5 ft 11 in)
- Position: Central midfielder

Team information
- Current team: PSK Putinci

Senior career*
Years	Team	Apps	(Gls)
1989–1997	Inđija		
1997–2004	ČSK Čelarevo	199	(75)
2004–2011	Inđija		
2013–2017	PSK Putinci		
- * Club domestic league appearances and goals

Predrag 'Peca' Kodžo (Serbian Cyrillic: Предраг Коџо; born on January 30, 1973) is a Serbian footballer. In Serbia, he is well known as "Peca". Well known for his technical skills and attractive playing style.

== Career in Inđija ==
Being born in Inđija, the majority of Predrag Kodžo's football career has taken place in the town's biggest club, FK Inđija. While the club was still playing in the Serbian First League, Kodžo played in 49 competitive matches and scored 3 times. One of the greatest highlights of his career was when he scored a goal against FK Metalac Gornji Milanovac on November 13, 2010, at an age of 37 years. For FK Inđija, Kodžo played in 532 matches and scored 144 goals. After retiring, he became director in FK Inđija. He reactivated his career and joined PSK Putinci.
