= Markus Wanner =

Swiss footballer (born 1973)

Personal information
- Date of birth: 18 February 1973 (age 53)
- Position: Defender

Senior career*
Years	Team	Apps	(Gls)
1992–1993	FC Winterthur		
1993–1996	FC St. Gallen		
1996–2004	FC Winterthur		

Managerial career
- 2009–2018: FC Seuzach
- * Club domestic league appearances and goals

Markus Wanner (born 18 February 1973) is a retired Swiss football defender.
