= Predrag Jeremić =

Serbian footballer

Personal information
- Full name: Predrag Jeremić
- Date of birth: 22 November 1987 (age 38)
- Place of birth: Šabac, SFR Yugoslavia
- Height: 1.79 m (5 ft 10 in)
- Position: Midfielder

Team information
- Current team: MB

Youth career
- Mačva Šabac

Senior career*
Years	Team	Apps	(Gls)
2005–2008	Sinđelić Niš		
2006–2007	→ Napredak Kruševac (loan)	13	(1)
2008–2009	Dinamo Vranje	15	(3)
2009	→ Banat Zrenjanin (loan)	4	(0)
2009–2011	Banat Zrenjanin	64	(10)
2012–2013	Napredak Kruševac	20	(0)
2014–2015	Radnik Surdulica	28	(3)
2015	Sloboda Užice	10	(2)
2016–2020	Mačva Šabac	63	(5)
2020–2023	07 Vestur	24	(4)
2024-	MB		
- * Club domestic league appearances and goals as of 18:08, 6 January 2021 (UTC)

Predrag Jeremić (Serbian Cyrillic: Предраг Јеремић; born 22 November 1987 in Šabac) is a Serbian football midfielder who plays for MB in the Faroe Islands. He is a midfielder, but sometimes he plays as right-back.

== Honours ==
Radnik Surdulica

- Serbian First League: 2014–15
