= GKS Górnik Łęczna =

Association football club in Poland

Górnik Łęczna
- Full name: Górniczy Klub Sportowy Górnik Łęczna
- Nicknames: Zielono-Czarni (The Green and Blacks)
- Founded: 20 September 1979; 47 years ago
- Ground: Stadion Górnika Łęczna
- Capacity: 7,200
- Chairman: Grzegorz Szkutnik
- Manager: Yuriy Shatalov
- League: II liga
- 2025–26: I liga, 17th of 18 (relegated)
- Website: gornikleczna.pl
Home colours	Away colours	Third colours

Górniczy Klub Sportowy Górnik Łęczna (pronounced [ɡurˈɲit͡ʂɨ ˈklup spɔrˈtɔvɨ ˈɡurɲik ˈwɛnt͡ʂna]), commonly referred to as Górnik Łęczna, is a sports club based in Łęczna, Poland. It is best known for its men's professional football team, which competes in II liga, the third division in the Polish football league system. The club also fields teams in women's football and wrestling.

== History ==
The club was founded in 1979, as a club for the local coal miners. As the years went, the local Bogdanka Coal Mine decided to invest more and more money and as a result the club quickly rose through the leagues. The club shed its relative obscurity when it gained promotion to the Ekstraklasa in 2003.

Górnik Łęczna played in the top division from 2003 until 2007, when they were relegated to the 3rd division, as a consequence of their involvement in a match fixing scandal. However they were promoted straight back up as league winners after the 2007–08 season and competed in the I Liga for six years before winning promotion to the 2014–15 Ekstraklasa.

Since 1 January 2007, the men's football department has been operating as a business entity separate from the rest of the club.

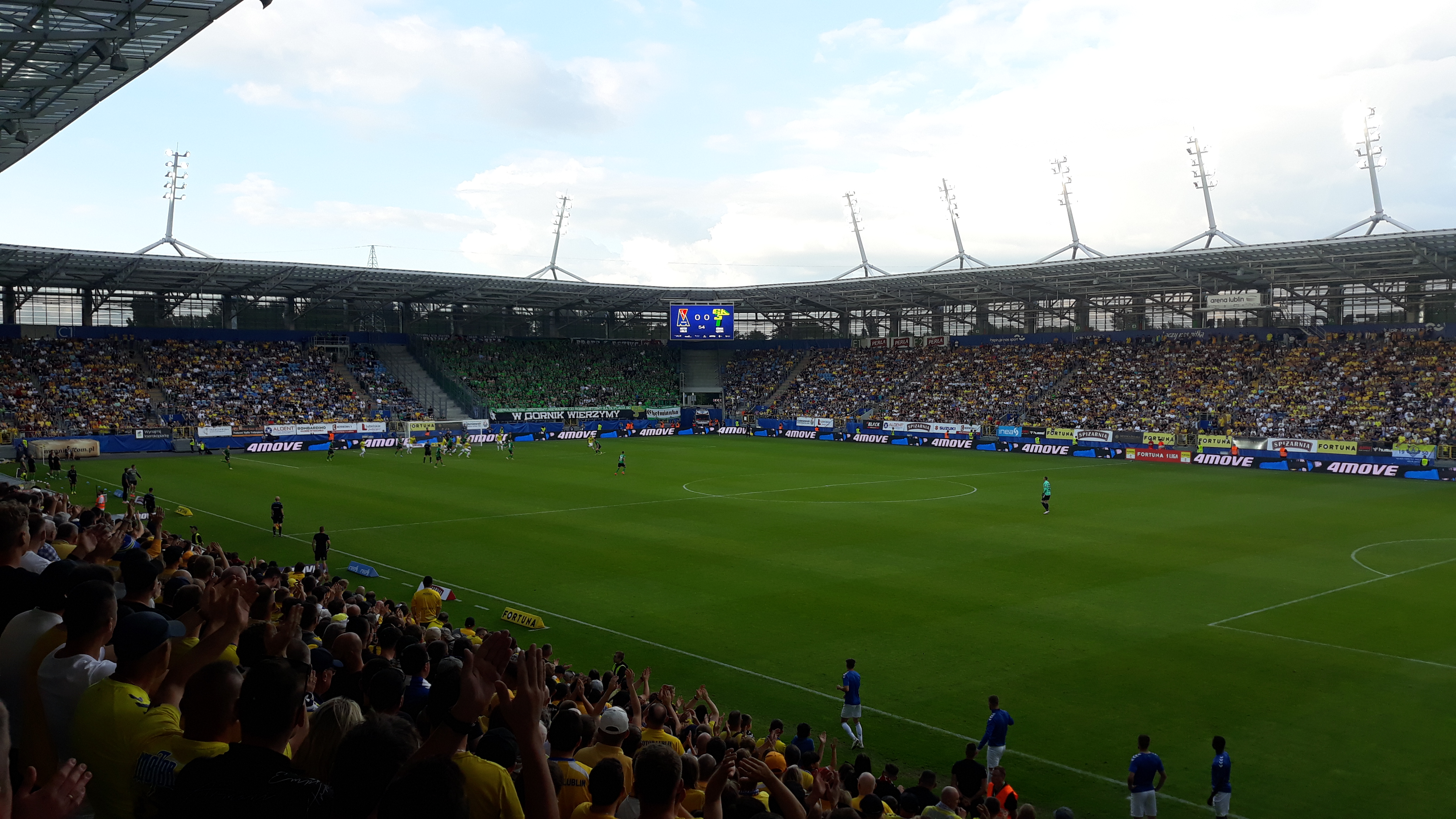
Away game with Motor Lublin in the 2023–24 I liga

In February 2011, the team was renamed GKS Bogdanka (Polish pronunciation: [bɔɡˈdaŋka]) for sponsorship reasons, a decision from the local Bogdanka coal mine. As a result, a group of supporters opposing the name change formed an amateur team GKS Górnik 1979 Łęczna. On 23 July 2013, GKS Bogdanka's board of directors announced the return to the former name.

== Honours ==
- Ekstraklasa
  - 7th place: 2004–05
- II liga
  - Champions: 1987–88 (gr. VII), 1995–96 (gr. V), 2007–08 (gr. IV), 2019–20
- Polish Cup
  - Semi-finalists: 2022–23
- Youth teams
  - Polish U-19 Championship
    - Third place: 2004, 2005

== Players ==
=== Current squad ===
As of 23 October 2026

Note: Flags indicate national team as defined under FIFA eligibility rules; some limited exceptions apply. Players may hold more than one non-FIFA nationality.

No.	Pos.	Nation	Player
1	GK	POL	Adam Matysek (on loan from Zagłębie Lubin)
3	DF	POL	Mateusz Hołownia
4	DF	POL	Paweł Jaroszyński (captain)
5	DF	POL	Rafał Kobryń
7	MF	POL	Bartłomiej Korbecki
8	MF	POL	Wiktor Niewiarowski
9	FW	CZE	Jindřich Novotný
10	MF	POL	Adam Deja
11	MF	POL	Dawid Tkacz
12	GK	POL	Szymon Puchalski
16	MF	POL	Michał Walski
17	MF	POL	Fryderyk Janaszek
19	MF	POL	Samuel Quainoo (on loan from Górnik Zabrze)
21	DF	POL	Jakub Bednarczyk

No.	Pos.	Nation	Player
22	MF	POL	Mikołaj Orzyłowski
23	DF	POL	Karol Turek
26	FW	POL	Wiktor Samonek
27	DF	POL	Grzegorz Rogala
29	FW	POL	Hubert Antkowiak
30	MF	UZB	Bekzod Akhmedov
38	MF	POL	Jakub Myszor
40	MF	POL	Erwin Stadnicki
74	DF	POL	Kamil Kruk
77	MF	POL	Iwo Świerkot
88	MF	POL	Oskar Osipiuk
99	GK	POL	Jakub Wilk
—	DF	POL	Kacper Radkowski
—	MF	POL	Michał Steszuk

=== Out on loan ===
Note: Flags indicate national team as defined under FIFA eligibility rules; some limited exceptions apply. Players may hold more than one non-FIFA nationality.

No.	Pos.	Nation	Player
—	GK	POL	Dawid Kłos (at Orlęta Radzyń Podlaski until 30 June 2027)

== GKS Górnik 1979 Łęczna ==
Górnik 1979 Łęczna was a club founded in 2011 by Górnik Łęczna fans who were unhappy with the name change to GKS Bogdanka. The club eventually changed its name back in 2013 but the fan owned counterpart has continued to operate in amateur football leagues. On 22 August 2014 the club withdrew from all competitions and ceased to operate, the reason cited were the lack of funds and the fact that the original Górnik Łęczna team went back to its original name scrapping the GKS Bogdanka name.

== Women's section ==
The women's section of Górnik Łęczna played for years in the second and third-tier leagues of Poland. In 2006–07 the team reached the semi-finals of the Polish Cup but lost to Medyk Konin. In the 2009–10 season with the expansion of the Ekstraliga Kobiet the team finally gained promotion to it by finishing second in its 2nd tier division. In its Ekstraliga debut Górnik was 5th.

== See also ==
- Football in Poland
- List of football teams
