= Predrag Jelenković =

Serbian politician

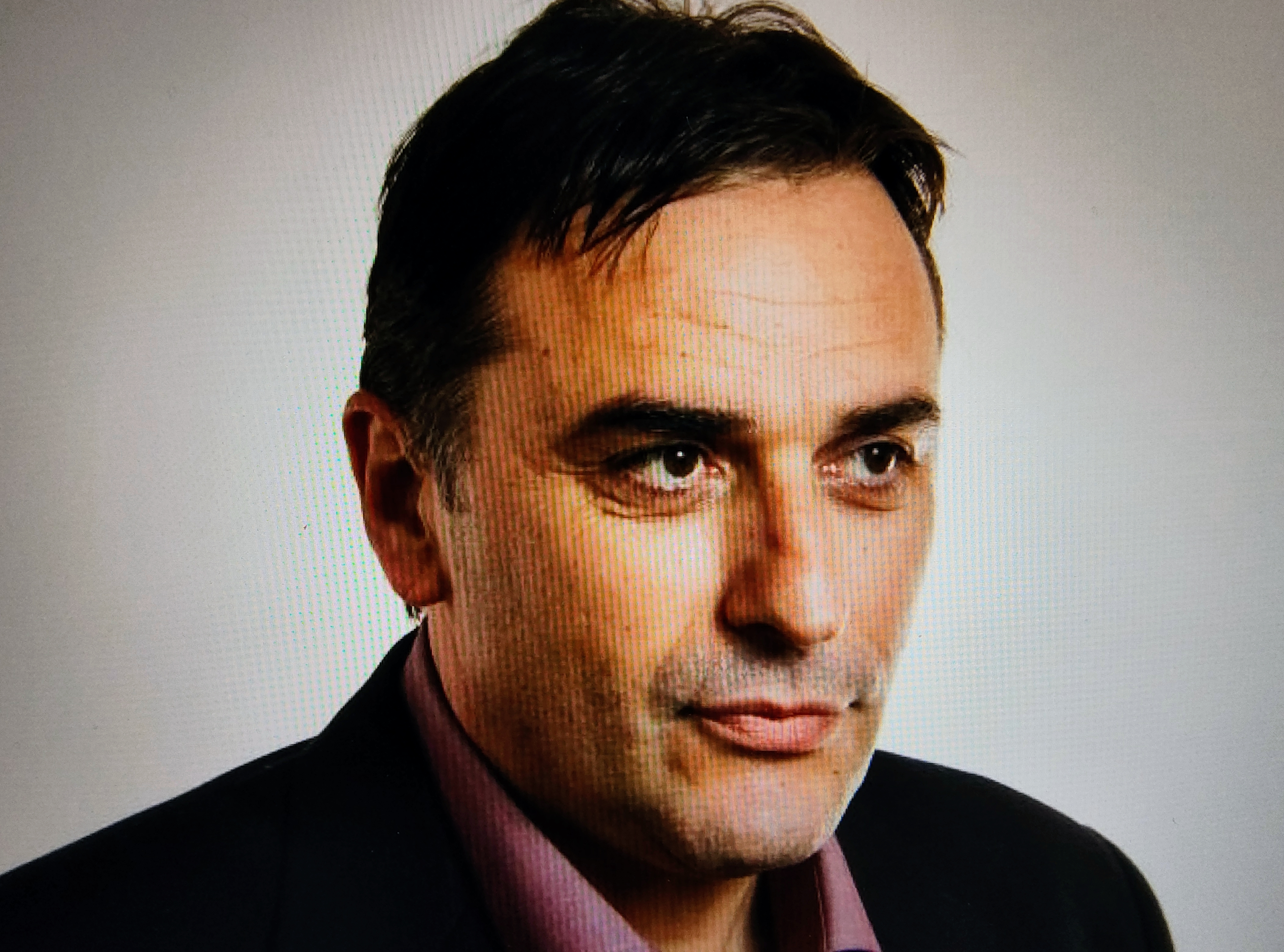
Image of Predrag Jelenkovic Peda

Predrag Jelenković (Serbian Cyrillic: Предраг Јеленковић; born 1965) is a politician in Serbia. He has served in the National Assembly of Serbia since 2016 as a member of the Social Democratic Party of Serbia (SDPS).

== Early life and career ==
Jelenković has a doctorate in communication sciences. He is based in Niš and worked in a privatization agency in the city.

== Political career ==
A longtime member of the Democratic Party, Jelenković joined the breakaway Liberal Democratic Party in 2005 and served as the leader of its local committee in Niš for several years thereafter. He received the eighty-first position on a coalition electoral list that included the Liberal Democratic Party in the 2007 Serbian parliamentary election; the list won fifteen mandates, and Jelenković was not included in his party's parliamentary delegation. (From 2000 to 2011, Serbian parliamentary mandates were awarded to sponsoring parties or coalitions rather than to individual candidates, and it was common practice for mandates to be awarded out of numerical order. Jelenković could have been selected as part of his party's delegation notwithstanding his relatively low position, though in fact he was not.) The Liberal Democratic Party contested the 2008 parliamentary election on its own, and Jelenković received the ninety-second position on its list; the party won thirteen mandates, and he was once again not selected for its parliamentary group.

Serbia's electoral system was reformed in 2011, such that parliamentary mandates were awarded in numerical order to candidates on successful electoral lists. The Liberal Democratic Party contested the 2012 parliamentary election as part of the Preokret coalition, alternately known in English as Turnover or U-Turn; Jelenković received the forty-third position on its list and, as the list won only nineteen seats, was not elected. He resigned from the Liberal Democratic Party later in the year and formed a new political party called Nišku priču in 2013. This party endorsed the Social Democratic Party of Serbia in the 2014 election, and it fully merged into the SDPS the following year.

The Social Democratic Party of Serbia contested the 2016 parliamentary election as part of the Aleksandar Vučić – Serbia Is Winning coalition led by the Serbian Progressive Party. Jelenković received the 236th position on the coalition's electoral list; this was too low a position for direct election to be a realistic prospect, and indeed he was not elected despite the list winning a landslide victory with 131 out of 250 mandates. When SDPS delegate Gordana Predić subsequently resigned her seat to accept a government position, however, he was able to enter parliament as her replacement. His term officially began on October 6, 2016. Jelenković is a member of the parliamentary committee on labour, social issues, social inclusion, and poverty reduction; a deputy member of three other committees; and a member of the parliamentary friendship groups with Austria, Bulgaria, Croatia, Japan, Montenegro, North Macedonia, Norway, Slovakia, Slovenia, and the Sovereign Military Order of Malta.

Jelenković was also a member of the Niš municipal council from 2012 to 2016, becoming leader of its committee on administrative issues in 2014.
