= Predrag Alempijević =

Serbian footballer

Personal information
- Date of birth: 23 December 1970 (age 55)
- Height: 1.70 m (5 ft 7 in)
- Position: Defender

Senior career*
Years	Team	Apps	(Gls)
1995–1999	Mladost Lučani	45	(1)
2000	Uralan Elista	5	(0)

Managerial career
- 2014-2019: Mladost Lučani (asst.)
- 2022-: Jedinstvo Puhovo
- * Club domestic league appearances and goals

Predrag Alempijević (Serbian Cyrillic: Предраг Aлeмпиjeвић; born 23 December 1970) is a Serbian retired football player.
