= Dragomir =

Slavic masculine given name

- Pronunciation: Romanian: [draɡoˈmir] Serbo-Croatian: [drâɡomiːr]
- Gender: masculine

Origin
- Language: Slavic
- Meaning: To whom peace is precious
- Region of origin: Eastern Europe

Other names
- Derived: drag (dear, precious) and mir (peace)
- Related names: Drahomír, Dragan, Drago, Predrag

Dragomir (Cyrillic: Драгомир) is a Slavic masculine given name. It is used as a given name in South Slavic languages, especially Serbian and Bulgarian, while in Romanian, it is used as a surname.

The name is composed of the Slavic elements drag (dear, precious) and mir (peace), both very common in Slavic dithematic names. It can be translated as To whom peace is precious, i.e. He who cares about peace. However, the ending mir, found in many Slavic names, has developed from the Old Slavic term *meru which meant 'large, great, greatly'. Thus the original Old Slavic meaning of the name would be He who is very dear or He who is very precious (to his family).

The female form of the name is Dragomira or Dragomirka. The equivalent in Czech and Slovak languages is Drahomír / Drahomíra.

== Notable people with the name ==
=== Given name ===
- Dragomir of Duklja (died 1018), Serbian medieval ruler
- Dragomir Arambašić (1881–1945), Serbian sculptor and painter
- Dragomir Bečanović (born 1965), Montenegrin judoka
- Dragomir Bojanić (1933–1993), Serbian actor
- Dragomir Brajković (1947–2009), Serbian writer and journalist
- Dragomir Brzak (1851–1905) was a Serbian dramatist, poet and travel writer
- Dragomir Bukvić (born 1954), Serbian basketball coach
- Dragomir Cioroslan (born 1954), Romanian weightlifter
- Dragomir Čumić (1937–2013), Serbian actor
- Dragomir Despić (born 1993), known as Desingerica, Serbian rapper
- Dragomir Draganov (footballer) (born 1981), Bulgarian footballer
- Dragomir Draganov (historian) (1948–2019), Bulgarian historian, politician and university professor
- Dragomir Dujmov (born 1963), Serbian poet and novelist
- Dragomir Felba (1921–2006), Serbian actor
- Dragomir Glišić (1872–1957), Serbian painter and war photographer
- Dragomir Herendić, Croatian guitarist and record producer
- Dragomir Hurmuzescu (1865-1954), Romanian physicist and inventor
- Dragomir Ilic (1925–2004), Yugoslav footballer
- Dragomir Jovanović (1902–1946), Serbian politician
- Dragomir Karić (born 1949), Serbian entrepreneur and politician
- Dragomir Krančević (1847–1929), Serbian violinist
- Dragomir Kusmuk (born 1955), Yugoslav judoka
- Dragomir Markov (born 1971), Bulgarian swimmer
- Dragomir Mihajlović (born 1960), Serbian rock guitarist
- Dragomir Milošević (born 1942), Serbian military commander and war criminal
- Dragomir Mrsic (born 1969), Serbian-Swedish actor
- Dragomir Nikolić, Serbian football manager
- Dragan Okuka (born 1954), Serbian football player and manager
- Dragomir Pavlović (born 1957), Serbian politician
- Dragomir Pavlović (born 1958), Serbian politician
- Dragomir Petkov (born 1998), Bulgarian footballer
- Dragomir Protić (1877–1905), known as Vojvoda Dragomir, Serbian military leader
- Dragomir R. Radev (1968–2023), American computer scientist and university professor
- Dragomir Racić 1945–2019), Yugoslav footballer
- Dragomir Stanković (born 1972), Serbian football referee
- Dragomir Stojanović (1878–1943), Serbian army general
- Dragomir Stoynev (born 1976), Bulgarian politician and economist
- Dragomir Tošić (1909–1985), Yugoslavian footballer and civil engineer
- Dragomir Vučković (1844–1899) was a Serbian army colonel
- Dragomir Vukobratović (born 1988), Serbian footballer
- Dragomir Yordanov (born 1967), Bulgarian judge and a politician
- Dragomir Zagorsky, Bulgarian author and philatelist
- Dragomir Zakov (born 1975), Bulgarian politician and diplomat

=== Surname ===
- Alexandru Dragomir (1916–2002), Romanian philosopher
- Anastase Dragomir (1896–1966), Romanian inventor
- Constantin Dragomir (born 1927), Romanian bobsledder
- Dana Dragomir (born 1964), Romanian-Swedish musician and composer
- Dimitrie Dragomir (1884–19??), Bessarabian politician
- Dumitru Dragomir (born 1946), Romanian football executive
- George Dragomir (born 2003), Romanian footballer
- Ioan Dragomir (1905–1985), Romanian bishop of the Greek-Catholic Church
- Ionuț Dragomir (born 1974), Romanian footballer
- Liliana Maria Dragomir (born 1990), Romanian long distance runner
- Mihu Dragomir (1919-1964), Romanian poet
- Ruxandra Dragomir (born 1972), Romanian tennis player
- Vlad Dragomir (born 1999), Romanian footballer
- Zeno Dragomir (1923–1967), Romanian pole vaulter

== As a place name ==
- Dragomir, village in Berzunți Commune, Bacău County, Romania
- Dragomir, village in Plovdiv municipality, Bulgaria

== See also ==
- Drahomír
- Drago (disambiguation)
- Dragomirov, surname
- Dragomiris, genus of insects
- Dragomirna (disambiguation)
- Dragomirovo (disambiguation)
