= Mitoc =

Mitoc may refer to several places in Romania:

- Mitoc, Botoșani, a commune in Botoșani County
- Mitoc, a village in Leorda Commune, Botoșani County
- Mitoc, a village in Șipote Commune, Iași County
- Mitoc, a village in Banca Commune, Vaslui County
- Mitoc (river), a tributary of the Suceava in Suceava County

and to:

- Mitoc, Orhei, a commune in Orhei district, Moldova

or:

- MIT Outing Club
