= Dragomir Draganov =

Dragomir Draganov may refer to:

- Dragomir Draganov (footballer) (born 1981), Bulgarian footballer
- Dragomir Draganov (historian) (1948–2019), Bulgarian historian, politician and university professor
