= 248th Rifle Division =

248th Rifle Division (June 27, 1941 – December 27, 1941) 248th Rifle Division (December 1941 – June 30, 1942) 248th Rifle Division (September 6, 1942 – October 1946)
- Active: 1941–1946
- Country: Soviet Union
- Branch: Red Army
- Type: Infantry
- Size: Division
- Engagements: Battle of Moscow; Second Battle of Kharkov; Battle of Stalingrad; Operation Uranus; Battle of Rostov (1943); Donbas strategic offensive (July 1943); Donbas strategic offensive (August 1943); Battle of the Dniepr; Odessa offensive First Jassy–Kishinev offensive Second Jassy–Kishinev offensive Vistula-Oder offensive Battle of Berlin
- Decorations: Order of the Red Banner (3rd Formation)
- Battle honours: Odessa (3rd Formation)

Commanders
- Notable commanders: Maj. Gen. Karol Karlovich Sverchevskii; Kombrig Aleksandr Nikolaevich Krivenko; Col. Iosif Ivanovich Matusevich; Col. Leonid Nikolaevich Alekseev; Col. Ivan Danilovich Kovalev; Maj. Gen. Nikolai Zakharovich Galai

The 248th Rifle Division was formed in the Moscow Military District as a reserve infantry division of the Red Army just days after the German invasion of the USSR. It was based on the shtat (table of organization and equipment) of April 5, 1941 with modifications due to the emergency. It was formed at Vyazma and would remain in the vicinity of this city during its entire 1st formation. When the final German offensive on Moscow began it was ordered to move south by rail, abandoning its positions along the upper reaches of the Dniepr River, but was soon ordered back when the offensive became more widespread. It was mostly encircled during Operation Typhoon and destroyed.

A new 248th Rifle Division was redesignated on April 11, 1942 from a 400-series division that began forming in December in the North Caucasus Military District. It had already been assigned to 28th Army, but was soon reassigned to 6th Army in Southwestern Front. As part of this Army it was located in the Izium-Barvinkove salient at the start of the Second Battle of Kharkiv. As a reserve division it saw little combat until after the German counteroffensive which encircled the salient. The 248th struggled to escape the trap but its losses were so great that it was again disbanded.

The third 248th Rifle Division also formed near Astrakhan, and also soon became part of 28th Army. In the wake of Operation Uranus it advanced westward, taking part in the liberation of Elista at the turn of the year. During January 1943 it pursued the forces of 1st Panzer Army withdrawing from the Caucasus region, and was badly damaged in fighting near Zernograd. After recovering from this it assisted in the final liberation of Rostov-on-Don, and then pursued German forces to the Mius River line. It remained on this line during the spring lull in operations. In August, as part of Southern Front (soon 4th Ukrainian Front) it helped liberate the Donbas before advancing through the rest of southern Ukraine. In April 1944, now under command of 5th Shock Army in 3rd Ukrainian Front, it won a battle honor for the liberation of Odesa. Following an abortive offensive along the Dniestr River in May the 248th served as the Army reserve in the offensive that knocked Romania out of the war in August. After this, the entire 5th Shock was transferred north to join 1st Belorussian Front for operations into Poland and Germany; the division was assigned to 9th Rifle Corps. For its successes in the Vistula-Oder Offensive, particularly its advance through Pomerania, the division was awarded the Order of the Red Banner. After the capture of Berlin the division's subunits were rewarded with a number of honors and decorations, and as a particular distinction a composite regiment made up of its most decorated soldiers was selected to participate in the Berlin Victory Parade. The 248th served in the Group of Soviet Forces in Germany until the division was disbanded in October 1946.

== 1st Formation ==
The 248th began forming on June 27 at Vyazma in the Smolensk Oblast. Once formed the division had the following order of battle:

- 899th Rifle Regiment
- 902nd Rifle Regiment
- 905th Rifle Regiment
- 771st Light Artillery Regiment
- 774th Howitzer Artillery Regiment
- 302nd Antitank Battalion
- 320th Reconnaissance Battalion
- 412th Sapper Battalion
- 644th Signal Battalion
- 277th Medical/Sanitation Battalion
- 242nd Chemical Defense (Anti-gas) Company
- 502nd Motor Transport Battalion
- 259th Field Bakery
- 370th Divisional Veterinary Hospital
- 926th Field Postal Station
- 656th Field Office of the State Bank

Maj. Gen. Karol Karlovich Sverchevskii took command of the division on the day it began forming and he would remain in this position for the duration of the 1st formation. As of July 1 it was still forming in the Moscow Military District, but just ten days later it had been assigned to the 53rd Rifle Corps of 24th Army in the Group of STAVKA Reserve Armies. It officially entered the fighting front on July 15.

== Battle of Moscow ==
On July 30 the Reserve Front was formed from the forces that had been holding the Rzhev-Vyazma line. 53rd Corps had been disbanded but the 248th remained in 24th Army when it was assigned to the new Front, which was under command of Army Gen. G. K. Zhukov. 24th Army comprised nine rifle divisions, two people's militia rifle divisions, one tank and one motorized division, and several artillery and antitank assets, and its boundary on the left ran from Ugriumovo Station to Luzhki (60km south of Vyazma) to Popovka (10km south of Yelnya). However, in the wake of the encirclement battle at Smolensk and the destruction of most of 28th Army at Roslavl the STAVKA transferred Reserve Front's 34th Army to Northwestern Front and replaced it with the new 35th Army, which it renamed 49th Army on August 11, and the 248th was transferred to this Army, which was under command of Lt. Gen. I. G. Zakharkin.

At 2030 hours on August 6, Zhukov issued orders to all the armies of his Front (apart from 24th Army, which had received its orders earlier) which included:

35th Army (with 248th, 194th, and 220th RDs, 3rd Bn, 392nd CAR, and 765th ATR - defend along the Aksiunina, Ivashkov, and Bonakova line and further along the eastern bank of the Dnepr River to Sumarokovo.

As of September 1 the 49th Army had the same three divisions under command, with the addition of the 4th People's Militia Rifle Division. A month later the militia had departed and the 303rd Rifle Division had taken its place. On September 20 the 248th was recorded as having 13,830 personnel on strength, well above the normal complement of 10,858, and was equipped with 34 76mm cannon, 12 152mm howitzers, 32 122mm howitzers, 12 120mm mortars, 84 50mm mortars and nine radio sets.

=== Operation Typhoon ===
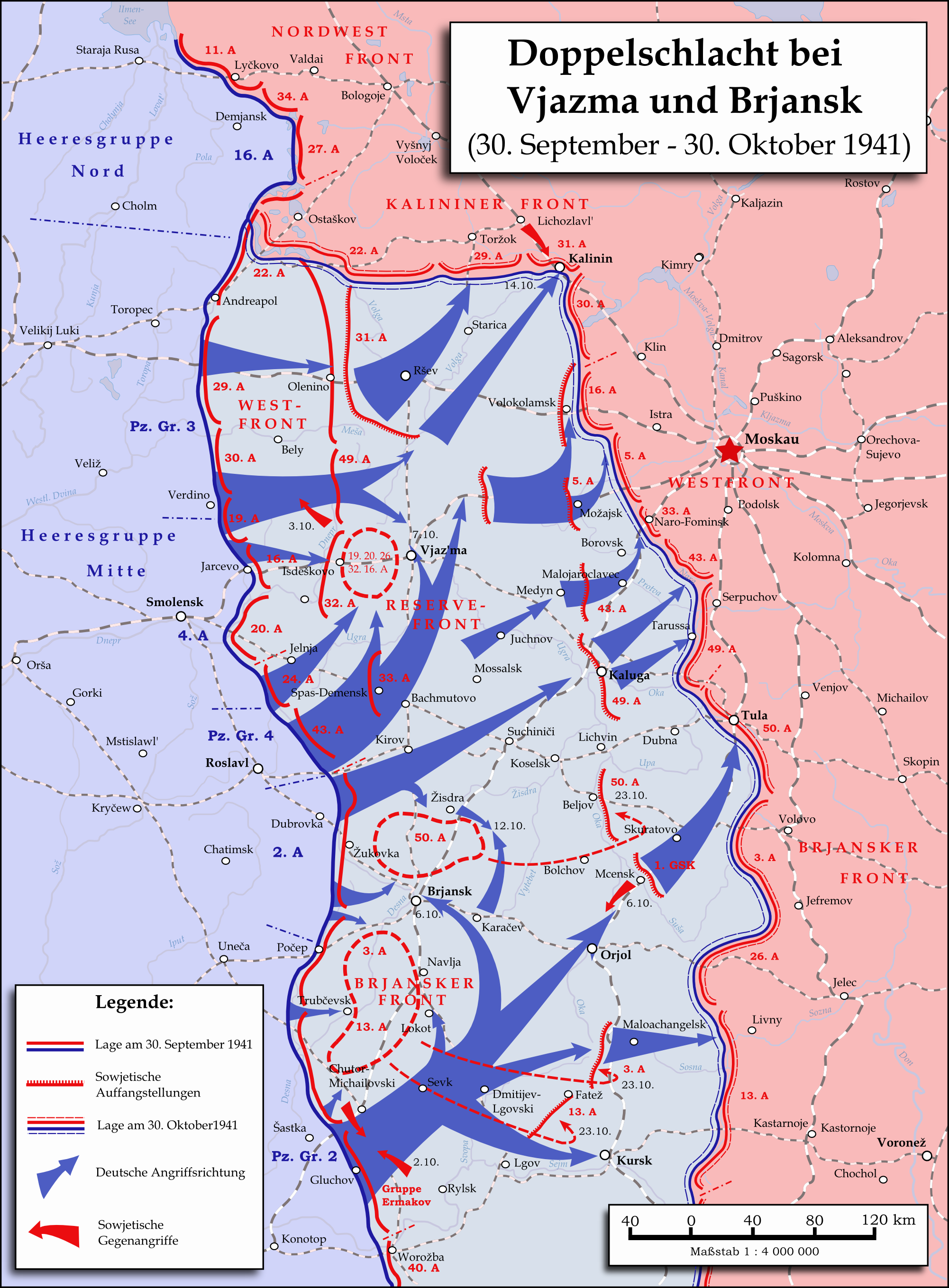
Operation Typhoon. Note the position of Reserve Front.

What was intended as the final German offensive on Moscow began in the south on September 30 with an assault on the Oryol axis led by 2nd Panzer Group. This quickly broke through the Soviet front, gaining 15-20km on the first day and creating a 30km-wide gap. Already that night the STAVKA was making the decision to block the Oryol, Kursk and Kharkiv axes in the rear of Bryansk Front. To this end the four rifle divisions of 49th Army, as well as its three cavalry divisions, were alerted for transfer by rail from their defensive line according to a set timetable. The 248th was set to depart second, following the 194th, from Kasnia Station at 1800 hours on October 3. This movement was based on a contingency plan made some time earlier. The 32nd Army's 140th Rifle Division arrived on the morning of October 2 to take over a sector of defense from the 905th Rifle Regiment and the 194th Division on the east bank of the Dniepr.

==== The Dniepr Bridgeheads ====
Early on October 2 the main German offensive on the Vyazma axis began. As a result, the departure point of the 248th was not changed, but it was now to move to the Belyov area to help form a second echelon for Reserve Front. The STAVKA was not immediately aware of how quickly and deeply the 3rd and 4th Panzer Groups were penetrating the Soviet front lines. Spearheads of the 6th and 7th Panzer Divisions managed to break through to the Dniepr and from the march managed to seize two bridges in the 248th's sector, at Glushkovo and Tikhanovo on October 3. The division had only just received the order to cease loading onto the trains and re-occupy its positions. In connection with the confusion that arose due to this about-face there was no opportunity to blow up or at least set fire to the bridges. Although the upper reaches of this river are not wide (25-40m) or particularly deep (0.7-3.0m) it presented a major antitank obstacle. The approaches to it were covered by the fire from a variety of defensive works on the eastern bank. Despite this, on October 4, under cover of heavy artillery and mortar fire, 25-30 tanks crossed and dug in on the sectors of the 248th and 220th Divisions.

Earlier that day the commander of Western Front, Col. Gen. I. S. Konev, had sent his deputy, Lt. Gen. S. A. Kalinin, to clarify the situation on the Dniepr. At 1950 hours this officer reported back that:

... [the enemy's] forward units, having infiltrated beyond the Dnepr River, continue to occupy the villages Tikhanovo, Glushkovo, Alad'ino and Ust'e. His strength in this region is not more than a battalion with 20 tanks...
North of the [Vyazma] river mouth, the defenses should be occupied by the 248th Rifle Division. It had been withdrawn to Novoduginskaia for entraining and is now returning. Major General Sverchevsky is now with me in the village of Tychkovo. The regiments will arrive in the middle of the night... The division commander intends to toss the enemy back beyond the Dnepr River at dawn on 5.10.
With the arrival of the 248th Rifle Division the situation will improve, but it must not be considered secure. Intervention is required.

At about this time the division came under the command of 32nd Army in Western Front. According to information recorded at Reserve Front headquarters at 2100 the same day, two regiments of the division were already "locked in combat" over the crossing as Glushkovo as early as 1800 and by 2000 had assembled along the Dniepr in the sector running from Parshino to the mouth of the Vyasma. As well, an attack by two German infantry companies had been driven back in the vicinity of the Tikhanovo crossing. Beyond this, the division's efforts to eliminate the bridgeheads and reoccupy its former defenses failed. In the time it took to return the 45-50km from Novoduginskaya the panzer troops had managed to strengthen their positions. The division's hastily organized attacks were met with fire of all types, including dug-in tanks and artillery firing from the west bank. General Kalinin had reported to Konev at 2100 on October 5:

... The 248th Rifle Division: Two regiments engaged the enemy, were placed under pressure, and are retreating. The division commander and I are detaining and rallying the troops.
The situation is alarming. The division's third regiment is on the march from Konstantinovo to Nastas'ino, the 143rd Tank Brigade has passed through Konstantinovo. We are organizing a morning attack to restore the situation. Urgent measures are necessary. I'm now departing from the command post of the 248th Rifle Division's commander 3 kilometres west of Nastas'ino for Konstantinovo to meet the brigade and the 905th Rifle Regiment along the way.
General Vishnevsky was here at 1800; he knows the situation and is taking measures. He is reinforcing the 248th Rifle Division with a regiment from the 140th Rifle Division. But this is insufficient.

At 2200 on the same day General Sverchevskii, having no communications link with either the Western or Reserve Fronts, reported the following information directly to the STAVKA: "For 45 minutes already, [enemy] tanks and motorized infantry have been moving uninterruptedly from Baranovo through Kamenets to Volochek, the majority presumably toward Andreevskoe and the rest toward Nastas'ino." At 0030 on October 6 Kalinin reported from Novo-Mishnevo: "The units of the Reserve Front proved to be unprepared. The 248th Rifle Division with two regiments fought well, but the enemy broke through its right flank at the Glushkovo crossing." With the breakout from Glushkovo the German offensive began to develop toward Vyazma, with part of their forces pivoting in the direction of Sychyovka. 7th Panzer Division was within 40km of Vyazma even before the breakout. At 1150 hours on October 6 the commander of 32nd Army, Maj. Gen. S. V. Vishnevskii reported to Konev:

... 2. The situation on 32nd Army's front changed dramatically on the morning of 6 October. Up to one tank division and one motorized division of the enemy broke through over the Glushkovo crossing...
My intended attack against this grouping with the 220th, 18th, 140th and 248th Rifle Divisions is developing slowly because of extremely heavy enemy air attacks. In the sector between the Dnepr and Viaz'ma Rivers, the 248th Rifle Division suddenly retreated...
The 18th, 248th and 140th Rifle Divisions have heavy losses in personnel and equipment. Problems with communications are having a disastrous effect.

By 1600 hours that day the 32nd Army had only limited forces under command, including roughly two regiments of the 248th in the area of Pigulino. As planned, General Kalinin launched the 905th Regiment with the 143rd Tanks on an attack toward Volochek, with the assignment to separate the German infantry from their tanks and then restore the situation. However, this force lacked the strength to do so. Meanwhile, the forward detachment of 7th Panzer had reached the Moscow-Minsk highway north of Vyazma during the afternoon before deploying screening detachments to the east in the direction of Gzhatsk, and to the west. At 1600 hours on October 7 General Vishnevskii reported, in part:

5. The 248th Rifle Division as a result of stubborn fighting 4-6 October has been rendered combat ineffective and is reorganizing in the Baranovo area The division has managed to assemble up to 600 men and through the efforts of the 140th Rifle Division, another 900 men have been collected...
The main reason for our failures is the ceaseless, destructive bombing of our troops by enemy aviation and the absence of anti-aircraft means.

Vishnevskii was in the process of withdrawing his headquarters to Mozhaysk, but he would be captured on October 13.

==== Battle in Encirclement ====
On October 7 the 7th Panzer linked up with 10th Panzer Division near Vyazma and the encirclement was completed. At 1030 on October 8, Lt. Gen. M. F. Lukin, commander of 19th Army, reported to STAVKA on the situation in his sector of the encirclement, in part:

5) Units of the 32nd Army have occupied the following positions:
... b)Remnants of the 248th and 140th Rifle Division in an aggregate number of up to 200 men have dropped down to the woods southwest of LOMY. At my order this group is to take up a defense in the area of KELITA [sic - correct is Khmelita, 32km southwest of Vyazma].

Lukin had established his headquarters near Lomy, which had been attacked by the 114th Infantry Regiment of 6th Panzer Division. He spent all of October 8 restoring order and regrouping for the breakout from encirclement. At this time some remnants of the 248th were occupying a defense at Koporikha on the Vazuza River north of Vyazma, outside the encirclement. According to some records the division attempted to assist the breakout of 19th Army, but its attack was driven back. The encirclement battle was effectively finished by October 18; on this date the division was left with only 681 personnel. In common with many other divisions destroyed in Operation Typhoon the 248th officially remained in the Red Army order of battle until December 27 when it was finally written off. General Sverchevskii took command of the 43rd Reserve Rifle Brigade for a few months and then served as commandant of the Kiev Rifle Officers School until mid-1943, when he was transferred to the Polish Army of the East. He ended the war in command of the 2nd Polish Army and reached the rank of colonel general before being killed by Ukrainian nationalists in March 1947.

== 2nd Formation ==
The 466th Rifle Division began forming in December at Astrakhan in the North Caucasus (later Stalingrad) Military District. On April 11, 1942 it was redesignated as the new 248th. Once redesignated the division had the following order of battle:

- 899th Rifle Regiment
- 902nd Rifle Regiment
- 905th Rifle Regiment
- 771st Artillery Regiment
- 302nd Antitank Battalion
- 80th Antiaircraft Battery
- 323rd Reconnaissance Company
- 412th Sapper Battalion
- 644th Signal Battalion
- 277th Medical/Sanitation Battalion
- 242nd Chemical Defense (Anti-gas) Company
- 502nd Motor Transport Company
- 469th Field Bakery
- 74th Divisional Veterinary Hospital
- 1685th Field Postal Station
- 1111th Field Office of the State Bank

Kombrig Aleksandr Nikolaevich Krivenko was appointed to command on the same day, but he was replaced four days later by Col. Iosif Ivanovich Matusevich, who would remain in this position for the duration of this formation. In May it was recorded that the personnel of the division were roughly 60 percent Russian, with most of the remaining 40 percent being Kyrgyz or Kalmyks. In March the division was assigned to 28th Army in the Reserve of the Supreme High Command, but after its redesignation it was reassigned to 6th Army in Southwestern Front.

=== Second Battle of Kharkiv ===
At this time the 6th Army was located in the northern sector of the Izium-Barvinkove salient south of Kharkiv. On May 11 the 248th was located in a reserve position near the town of Mykhailivka. In the plan of the offensive, which began on May 12, two shock groups were to penetrate the German front and advance to encircle and recapture Kharkiv; the southern shock group consisted of the 6th Army and Army Group Bobkin to its left. Together the group had eight rifle and three cavalry divisions, plus 11 tank and two motorized rifle brigades and would advance on a 36km-wide front.

The southern shock group began its attack at 0730 hours following a 60-minute artillery preparation. It struck forces of VIII and LI Army Corps on a front from Verkhnii Bishkin through Alekseevskoe and Grushino to Mironovka, but this did not directly involve the 248th in second echelon. As the offensive developed over the next days, particularly in the direction of Krasnohrad, the division remained in place. On May 15 it began moving toward the fighting front through the Bereka River valley along with some of the reserve tank formations. In response to the offensive as a whole the 1st Panzer Army south of the salient began regrouping on May 16 for a counterstrike against the 9th Army of Southern Front on the currently inactive south facing of the salient.

On the morning of May 17 the German forces went over to the offensive. The attack struck the boundary between the 341st and 106th Rifle Divisions, while on a second axis it hit the front of the 51st Rifle Division and the left flank of the 335th Rifle Division. By 0800 the 9th Army's defense had been penetrated to a depth of as much as 10km. By noon this depth had increased to 20km and the leading units of 14th Panzer Division were fighting along the southern outskirts of Barvinkove. At this time the 248th was still in 6th Army's reserves at Efremovka as this disaster unfolded far to its rear. Marshal S. K. Timoshenko, commander of Southwestern Front, reported to the STAVKA at 1730 that the German attack likely aimed "to secure the Barvenkovo, Izium region and attempt to cut off [our] offensive on Kharkov from the south."

Shortly after this, Lt. Gen. I. K. Bagramyan, Timoshenko's chief of staff, received intelligence from documents captured by 38th Army that German 6th Army was planning to attack the salient from the north as well. Despite Bagramyan's entreaties to act, Timoshenko limited himself to ordering the transfer of the 21st Tank Corps and the 248th to restore 9th Army's defensive positions. Timoshenko was determined to continue the southern shock group's offensive. On May 18 the division began its retrograde movement to the southeast, but Barvinkove had already fallen and Izium was under threat. By 2300 hours on May 19 it was back to southeast of Mykhailivka with the 21st Tanks. At noon that day Timoshenko had finally accepted that, not only had his offensive failed, but the armies in the salient were faced with catastrophe.

==== Battle in Encirclement ====
Timoshenko ordered a regrouping at 1730 hours. The forces of the southern shock group were to go over to the defense. In addition, the 248th, along with several other formations, were to remain in or return to control of 6th Army. While two divisions were to defend the right bank of the Northern Donets River the remainder, including the 248th, were to defeat the German grouping near Barvinkove and, in cooperation with 9th and 57th Armies of Southern Front, restore the situation on that Front's right flank. During the night of May 20/21 the division, along with the 411th and 103rd Rifle Divisions, was moved to a line from Krasnopavlovka to the Bereka to conduct a counterattack against the left flank of 1st Panzer Army. But on May 22 that Army linked up with 6th Army advancing from the north and the Soviet forces in the salient were encircled.

Timoshenko now called for a concerted breakout to the west from the encircled salient by the combined remnants of 6th and 57th Armies. This was to link up with a relief force of 38th Army, which was to fight its way through German lines west of the Northern Donets. This force was slow to form and the plan came to nothing. Meanwhile the German forces were widening the corridor dividing the pocket from the main Soviet forces to as much as 25km. During May 23 and 24 the encircled troops attacked the corridor in a desperate but more realistic aim of breaking out to the east. The 248th was initially on the west bank of the Bereka facing the German-held village of Marivka on the opposite side. The German 1st Mountain Division was located inside the corridor to act against any Red Army breakthroughs from either side. On the 24th the remnants of 57th Army linked up with the division, which was making some progress in crossing the river and retaking Marivka. The main breakout effort began 1000 hours on May 25, but the 248th was initially assigned a defensive role guarding the south flank of the breakout shock group. The breakout remained disorganized throughout the day.

In conjunction with the 411th Division and 23rd Tank Corps the 248th sidestepped to the north and pushed across the Bereka, reaching Panteleeva "Balka" against forces of 60th Motorized Division. This force was now about one-third across the corridor, but now ran into 1st Mountain. During May 26 the breakout group, which had also been largely repelled, linked up with the right flank of the two divisions. Formed units were unable to break through, but individuals and small groups were managing to escape. In the end around 22,000 men emerged from the pocket. The 248th disappeared from the order of battle maps after May 26, but it was not officially disbanded until June 30.

== 3rd Formation ==
A new 248th officially formed on September 6, again at and near Astrakhan. There is some evidence that sufficient personnel escaped from Izium-Barvenkove to provide a cadre for the new formation, if only due to it being assigned to the front much faster than most new divisions in this period. According to Grylev (see Bibliography) it also incorporated the 1st and 2nd Astrakhan Infantry Schools. Once formed it had a similar order of battle to the first two formations:

- 899th Rifle Regiment
- 902nd Rifle Regiment
- 905th Rifle Regiment
- 771st Artillery Regiment
- 302nd Antitank Battalion
- 80th Antiaircraft Battery
- 323rd Reconnaissance Company
- 442nd Sapper Battalion (later 412th)
- 644th Signal Battalion (later 241st Signal Company)
- 277th Medical/Sanitation Battalion
- 242nd Chemical Defense (Anti-gas) Company
- 175th Motor Transport Company
- 469th Field Bakery
- 74th Divisional Veterinary Hospital
- 16200th Field Postal Station (later 1803rd)
- 7208th Field Office of the State Bank

Col. Leonid Nikolaevich Alekseev was appointed to command on September 6. This artillery officer had previously served as deputy commander of the 2nd Guards Rifle Division and as commander of the 5th Destroyer (Antitank) Division. Before the end of the month the 248th had been assigned to 28th Army in Stalingrad Front. In August it had been recorded that 80 percent of the division's personnel were Russian, from the 1923-1925 year groups (17-19 year olds).

== Operation Uranus ==
As of November 19 the 28th Army, under command of Lt. Gen. V. F. Gerasimenko, was part of Stalingrad Front. It comprised just two rifle divisions (248th and 34th Guards), three rifle brigades, two fortified regions, a cavalry battalion, 6th Guards Tank Brigade and 565th Tank Battalion, 35th Armored Car Battalion, and three armored trains. It was deployed over a vast area near and west of Astrakhan, acting as a link between Stalingrad and North Caucasus Front and facing the German 16th Motorized Division which was patrolling an equally vast area east of Elista on the Kalmyk Steppe. The 248th had one "flying battalion" of the 905th Rifle Regiment as part of the Army's advance guard. The 899th Regiment was in the Lake Sarpa area and the remainder of the division was in reserve.

Gerasimenko issued his Order No. 9 on November 13, directing his Army to advance westward against the German forces at the start of Operation Uranus. The "flying battalion" would join the 34th Guards, the 565th Tanks, and a Guards Mortar regiment in the main drive along the Utta Road to capture Khulkhuta. Meanwhile the 899th Regiment was to march 100km south to reach Utta. The attack began overnight on November 19/20. Khulkhuta was taken on November 21, at considerable cost, and the 16th Motorized fell back on Yashkul, leaving a small rearguard at Utta. The main body of the 248th reached Khulkhuta on November 22, linking up with the "flying battalion". After Khulkhuta was taken the 6th Guards Tanks advanced on Utta and immediately attacked, driving off a German force of two infantry platoons and several tanks, destroying two of the latter at no cost to itself. The 899th Regiment arrived at Utta at 1900 hours following a two-day forced march.

For the liberation of Yashkul, Gerasimenko ordered the 34th Guards and the 899th Regiment to advance along the Yashkul road with the 103rd Guards Rifle Regiment in the lead. Although the size of the attacking force was severely limited by a shortage of trucks he assured his superiors that it could cope with the 16th Motorized, which had lost some 1,100 men in the previous fighting. By the end of November 22 the German division was holding new defenses to protect the eastern approaches to Elista in cooperation with three volunteer Turkmen battalions. The 28th Army's westward march was interrupted on November 24 when its shock group halted abruptly less than 10km east of its objective. Gerasimenko's initial report to Stalingrad Front asserted, "The enemy is defending previously-prepared centers of resistance in the Oling and Iashkul' region with a force of up to a regiment of infantry and artillery and tanks." In fact the defending force turned out to be far larger. 16th Motorized was now operating under command of 4th Panzer Army and had been ordered to make a stand in Yashkul.

28th Army began testing the strength of 16th Motorized's defenses on November 25. The 34th Guards had been resting its forces after losing about a quarter of its strength in the fighting for Khulkhuta. Despite this, and a lack of artillery support, it went over to the attack at 1900 hours, with support from 6th Guards Tanks and with the 899th Regiment in reserve. The main forces of 34th Guards overcame the forward German foxholes and trenches in the late evening, occupied Oling at 2300 and then advanced 2-3km to reach within 4km of the main German line around Yashkul. The German command dispatched a battalion of infantry mounted in trucks, plus 10 to 12 tanks, eastward, south of the main road, with orders to strike the advancing Soviet force's left flank. The motorized infantry ran into the 899th near a clump of trees called Shalda Grove. In a sharp fight the 899th lost most of its supporting artillery plus 220 men killed, 245 wounded, and 225 missing. The results might have been worse, but the German force was ordered to withdraw to the main defenses. A further counterattack struck the 34th Guards, leading to a partial encirclement and further heavy losses. It would be some time before the Army would be able to regroup and continue the advance on Yashkul and Elista.

=== Advance Along the Manych ===
Colonel Alekseev left the division on December 22. He would go on to a number of artillery commands and was promoted to the rank of lieutenant general in September 1945. He was replaced by Lt. Col. Nikolai Zakharovich Galai, who had previously led the 93rd Rifle Brigade. During this month the 28th Army was reassigned to Southern Front. As of January 1, 1943 the 248th was the only rifle division in the Army, although it also had six rifle brigades and two fortified regions.

With the failure of the German offensive to relieve their forces at Stalingrad, the position of their forces farther south became untenable. LVII Panzer Corps initiated the first stage of its withdrawal overnight on December 31/January 1, with one regiment of 16th Motorized left to defend Dubovskoe. At the same time, 28th Army captured Elista at 2330 hours, with the 248th attacking from the south. This placed the lead elements of the Army roughly 75km northeast of the Manych River near Divnoe. The 60th Motorized Regiment and the three Turkmen battalions began a withdrawal to new defenses in this area and Gerasimenko ordered his forces to pursue, with the 248th heading south to the Manych south of Divnoe.

By late on January 2 the 34th Guards had rejoined the Army and the 248th had reached Amtia-Usta, 33km southwest of Elista. The next afternoon Gerasimenko issued orders that would bring more than half of his Army into the fight for Proletarskaia, but the division and the 159th Rifle Brigade were left along the Manych on the Divnoe axis to protect Elista, taking over a defensive sector from the 34th Guards. At 0430 hours on January 7 he issued further orders, including:

248th RD's 902nd RR, will capture Divnoe by a surprise attack at first light on 7 January 1943 and simultaneously bring forward the remaining forces of the division to Priiutnoe to exploit 902nd RR's attack.

The regiment was to dig in after taking the objective; it was facing the 60th Motorized. An after action report stated:

248th RD. 309th (sic) RR forced the Manych River on the morning of 7 January 1943 and attacked toward Divnoe. One battalion reached the northern outskirts of Divnoe at 1730 hours, where it was counterattacked by 12 enemy tanks. The battalion withdrew northward 5 kilometres to the defenses of the regiment's remaining battalions.

The other regiments reached the north bank of Lake Podmanki and the crossing over the Manych by early on January 8. The battle for Divnoe was complicated by the difficulty of bringing the artillery forward through a region with extensive lakes. 28th Army reported on January 9 that one regiment of the division was fighting in the region of Lake Podmanki with up to a battalion of counterattacking German infantry and five tanks at 1040 hours. The 905th Regiment was 4km north of Divnoe, the 899th was 1km north of Lake Podmanki and the 902nd was at Pravyi and Levyi Islands and at Karentin. All the counterattacks were repelled, but a fresh force of infantry and tanks on the division's left blocked any further advance by intense fire. A further situation report on January 11 stated:

248th RD repelled many enemy counterattacks by forces of up to two battalions of motorized infantry with 5-14 tanks on 9 and 10 January. In light of the strong resistance by enemy forces with superior mobility (16th MotD and 46th Reserve Regiment) and shortages of ammunition, the division withdrew its regiments to the northern bank of the Manych River, as follows: 905th RR - Pravyi Island; 902nd RR - Levyi Island; 899th RR - from Marker 13 to the northeastern shore of Lake Manych. During the day on 11 January 1943, the division's units exchanged fire with the enemy, regrouped their forces, and refilled with ammunition. On 11 January 1943 the division destroyed up to 2 platoons of enemy infantry, 2 vehicles, 3 heavy machine guns, and 1 mortar with artillery fire.

During January 13-14 the division remained stymied in its efforts to advance south, coming under methodical artillery and mortar fire. According to incomplete data it had suffered losses of 264 men killed and 462 wounded during January 6-9.

Gerasimenko issued another order at 1640 hours on January 16 directing the 248th and the 159th Brigade to capture Divnoe by the end of the next day and subsequently advance south of the Manych toward Salsk, almost 150km to the north. This attack was carried out successfully. The division reached the Kievka region at 1600 on January 19, on the march to the Novyi Egorlyk region. The next day it continued its march to the Yashalta region. The main objective of 28th Army at this time was to prevent 5th SS Panzergrenadier Division Wiking from escaping westward through Salsk. The report for January 21 states the 248th had passed through Esto-Khadinskii at noon en route to Novyi Egorlyk. It reached that place at 0600 the next day and concentrated there for a short rest.

Lt. Colonel Galai was directed to continue moving along the Kruchenaya Balka and Sosoevo–Aleksandrovka march-route at first light on January 24 to reach the Nizhnyi Khutor Seiatel, Novyi Put, and Tatsin region by day's end. The 248th would be put in reserve in Novyi Put. On January 24 the 5th SS was manning defenses from Kommuna southward through Egorlykskaya against roughly half of 28th Army while the 248th, still in reserve, reached Tatsin after a march of 10km. A report by the Army headquarters at 1900 hours on January 25 stated:

248th RD is on the march to the Novyi Ukrainskii and Proshchal'nyi region. As the result of the six-day march without a rest and the bad weather, the division had 590 soldiers left behind [stragglers]. The division's artillery and rear are lagging behind the marching infantry significantly because of the tired and overworked horses.

On January 26 the defenses of 5th SS began to give way, but the 248th remained in second echelon, leaving Proshchalnyi at noon and moving toward Krasnoarmeiskii behind the 34th Guards.

==== Counterattack at Zernograd ====
The next day the division made contact with 5th SS's Nordland Regiment in positions 5km south of Kommuna at 1430 hours and sent out combat reconnaissance to determine the extent of its defenses near Krasnoarmeiskii. A report overnight on January 28/29 stated that the division was continuing to advance northwestward, while its 905th Regiment fought with German forces west of Tishchenko. On January 29 the 248th, less the 905th Regiment, was east of the Kamennyi State Farm at 1300 hours, and was attacking toward the eastern outskirts of Zernograd. In the course of this advance the division, as well as the 52nd and 79th Rifle Brigades, were struck almost simultaneously by two battlegroups of 5th SS and by 11th Panzer Division, leading to the encirclement of the entire Soviet force, which caused a complete breakdown of command and control. Air attacks added to the chaos. The 248th suffered heavy losses in the breakout, including Lt. Colonel Galai, who was severely wounded but evacuated. He was replaced in command on February 2 by Lt. Colonel Ivan Danilovich Kovalev, who had been serving as the division's chief of artillery. This officer would be promoted to the rank of colonel on February 22.

The three damaged Soviet units spent January 30 - February 1 putting themselves back in order southwest of Mechetinskaya. On January 31 they concentrated in Zernograd as stragglers and escaped soldiers returned to the ranks. The next day it was reported that the division had only 1,473 personnel on strength. 11th Panzer departed overnight on February 1/2. At 0700 hours the 248th resumed its advance, now toward Kagalnitskaya; it reached this place at 1700 on February 3. The next day it attacked toward Kazachii behind the 34th Guards and 99th Rifle Brigade. By evening it was in Kazachii and protecting the Army's left flank, and on February 5 it took up a position echeloned to the right behind 34th Guards by noon. This division, in cooperation with 6th Guards Tank Brigade, the 248th, and 159th Rifle Brigade, liberated the southern part of Bataysk and was now only 15km southwest of Rostov-on-Don, the objective of the campaign.

==== Battle for Rostov ====
The remainder of Bataysk soon fell, and on February 7 the 248th remained in its northwestern part for further reorganization. The following day it was officially moved to the Army reserve and remained in the city. By February 9 the battle for Rostov was underway, with Southern Front attempting to envelop the German forces from the west. The division was ordered to cross the Don and reinforce the 34th Guards, but this failed to restore momentum. A further effort the next day preempted a counterattack by the weak 23rd Panzer Division, striking two of its panzergrenadier battalions near the brick factory in Nizhne-Gnilovskaya, bypassing one and penetrating to near the city center. 28th Army now had two divisions, three rifle brigades and one tank brigade fighting in a roughly 8km-wide swath of territory from the railroad bridge and station westward to about 1km west of Nizhne-Gnilovskaya. Its forces were now counterattacked by Battlegroup Hoheisel, which contained Tiger tanks. These caused consternation in the Soviet ranks, but the battlegroup ran short of infantry and had to withdraw by nightfall, permitting the Soviets to recover much of their lost ground. Despite this fighting the 248th had recovered some of its strength, with 2,589 men on the rolls on February 11, of which 1,461 were riflemen or sappers. During the day it engaged small groups of German troops between the Bataysk-Rostov railroad and the school on Ambulatornaya Street.

As the fighting for the city continued through February 13, Field Marshal E. von Manstein convinced Hitler to withdraw the remaining German forces from the Northern Donets and the Don back to the Mius River, where there were extensive fortifications dating back to late 1941. The maneuver began on the night of February 8/9 and was to be completed by February 18; Rostov was evacuated early on February 14. The 248th reached the main railroad station at 0430 hours and Kamenolomni, 7km north of the city's center, at 1100. It now began its part in the pursuit operation, moving toward Sultan Saly, 19km northwest of the city. On February 16 it was 15km west of that place, moving to Novo-Stroenko, 48km northwest of Rostov. At midnight it reached Kuzminskii before pressing on to Novo-Stroenko, 30-35km east-southeast of Matveyev Kurgan.

By February 18 the 28th Army had run up against the Mius-Front and the pursuit ended. The 248th was exchanging fire with the German forces defending Hill 83.0 from positions on the southern outskirts of Sedovskii and 2km to the south (15-17km southeast of Matveyev Kurgan) at 1400 hours. Between February 11-20 the division had lost 121 men killed, 226 wounded and 27 missing. Its strength on the latter date was 3,646 personnel, including 512 replacements from February 10-19. The division would have time to rebuild further, as Southern Front would remain facing the Mius until August. On April 29, Galai, who had been promoted to the rank of colonel during his convalescence, returned to command. He would be further promoted to major general on September 13, 1944, and would remain in command until March, 1946. During May the 248th was transferred to the 44th Army, still in Southern Front, where it was assigned to the 37th Rifle Corps.

== Into Ukraine ==
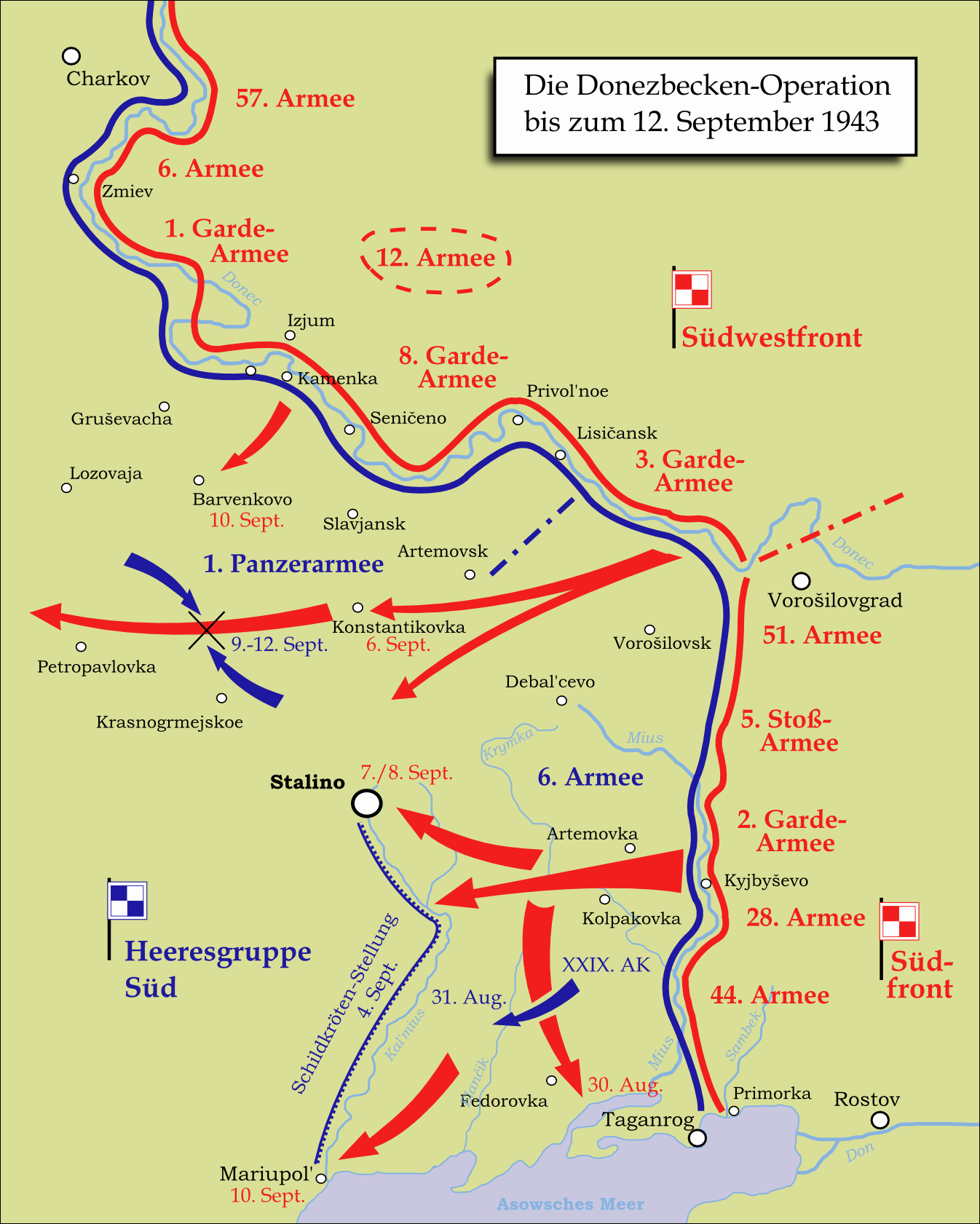
Donbas Offensive, August 1943

44th Army was located on Southern Front's left flank, from the Sea of Azov and along the Mius. The Southwestern and Southern Fronts began an offensive on the morning of July 17, with 28th and 44th Armies striking the Mius line in the Golodayevka area. They faced the reconstructed German 6th Army. The Soviet forces quickly scored sizeable breakthroughs in an effort to secure the Donbas basin, but were unable to expand their breaches due to the intervention of panzer reserves. By the end of the month the offensive had lost its momentum and 6th Army was soon able to restore most of its front.

In early August the 37th Corps was reassigned to 28th Army. Southern Front began its new offensive on August 18, attacking in much the same area but now with 2nd Guards and 5th Shock Armies making up the weight of the force. It began with an overwhelming concentration of artillery fire and before the end of the day the spearheads of 5th Shock had penetrated up to 7km through a 3km-wide gap. It continued to advance by moonlight. The next day the 905th Rifle Regiment attacked a German strongpoint near the village of Petropole in an effort to widen the gap. As his platoon was held up with machine gun fire from a German bunker, Sen. Sgt. Pavel Grigorievich Pudovkin attempted to silence it with grenades. When this failed he rushed the bunker and covered its embrasure with his body, at the cost of his life, allowing it to be knocked out and for the advance to continue. On March 19, 1944, Pudovkin was posthumously made a Hero of the Soviet Union.

6th Army had no tanks at all, and although von Manstein secured the weak 13th Panzer Division on August 20, it was unable to close the gap when it attacked on August 23. On August 27 the 2nd Guards Mechanized Corps turned south out of the breakthrough area and began a dash to the coast behind the German XXIX Army Corps. On the 29th the 2nd Guards reached the sea west of Taganrog and the German corps was pocketed between it and the 28th and 44th Armies. The next day 13th Panzer opened a narrow gap in the line and the 9,000 men of XXIX Corps were able to escape during the night with few losses. On August 31 Hitler authorized a withdrawal to the Kalmius River.

Hitler reluctantly approved a further withdrawal of the 6th and 1st Panzer Armies on September 8 to the Wotan position between Melitopol and the Dniepr south of Zaporizhzhia. On October 2 the STAVKA, realizing that their forces had reached the line the Germans meant to hold, broke off the offensive along the entire front for a week while they regrouped. 28th Army was now on the far left of the line, near the Sea of Azov. On October 9 Southern Front (redesignated as 4th Ukrainian Front on October 20) resumed the offensive against 6th Army. The attack, by 28th and 51st Armies, began on a 30km front straddling Melitopol following another massive artillery preparation. The battle for the city continued until October 23, after which the two Soviet armies drove south and southwest, splitting 6th Army in two. On October 27 the 13th Panzer again attempted to plug the gap, but was unable to do so. On October 30 the 28th and 51st Armies smashed the south flank of 6th Army and began swift thrusts to the Isthmus of Perekop and to Kherson. This advance cut the ground routes to the Axis forces in Crimea.

During November the 248th, again with 37th Corps, was transferred to 3rd Guards Army, still in 4th Ukrainian Front. In January 1944 the Corps (248th and 416th Rifle Divisions) was moved to the Front reserves, and a month later it was reassigned (with the addition of 61st Rifle Division) to 5th Shock Army in 3rd Ukrainian Front. The division would remain part of this Army into the postwar.

=== Odesa Offensive ===
The 1st, 2nd and 3rd Ukrainian Fronts began the Uman–Botoșani offensive on March 5. By March 25 the 3rd Ukrainian was being directed to secure the city of Odesa, which was expected to be taken at the earliest around April 5. The Front was led by Pliyev's Cavalry-Mechanized Group, followed by the 8th Guards and 6th Armies to envelop the city from the northwest and west while the 5th Shock was to advance on its defenses directly from the east.

On April 4 Pliyev's Group and the lead elements of 37th Army signalled the beginning of the final phase of the Odesa offensive by capturing the town of Razdelnaia, 60km northwest of the city, thus once again splitting German 6th Army into two distinct parts. Once this was accomplished the Front commander, Army Gen. R. Ya. Malinovskii, ordered Pliyev to race south as fast as possible to cut the withdrawal routes of the German forces from the Odesa region. At the same time the three combined-arms armies were to move in to take the city. After heavy fighting on its northern and eastern approaches the forward detachments of 5th Shock entered its northern suburbs on the evening of April 9. Overnight the remaining Soviet forces approached Odesa's inner defenses from the northwest and west. With the trap closing shut the remainder of the defending LXXII Army Corps began breaking out to the west, allowing the Soviet forces to occupy the city's center at 1000 hours on April 10 after only minor fighting. As a result the division was awarded an honorific:

ODESSA... 248th Rifle Division (Col. Galai, Nikolai Zakharovich)... The troops who participated in the liberation of Odessa, by the order of the Supreme High Command of 10 April 1944, and a commendation in Moscow, are given a salute of 24 artillery salvoes from 324 guns. At the same time, in honor of the troops that liberated the most important port on the Black Sea - Odessa, the ships of the Black Sea Fleet saluted with 12 artillery salvoes from 120 guns.

== Jassy–Kishinev Offensives ==
Following the battle for Odesa, the STAVKA ordered 3rd Ukrainian Front to mount a concerted effort to force the Dniestr, capture Chișinău, and eventually occupy all of eastern Bessarabia. 5th Shock and 6th Armies were engaged in mopping up Odesa and were unable to join the pursuit for at least a week, when they were to reinforce the forward armies wherever required. The initial efforts to force the river were only partially successful, with a series of small and tenuous bridgeheads being seized. On the night of April 12/13 it was decided to reinforce 8th Guards Army with part of the 5th Shock's forces, but this would not take place until April 18-20 due to the state of the roads. The Army was expected to be required to overcome German strongpoints at Cioburciu and Talmaza before advancing westward.

By April 19 the 37th Corps had reached the Dniestr northwest of Cioburciu but Malinovskii delayed the 5th Shock and 6th Armies' main offensives until the 25th largely due to the failures of the 5th Guards and 57th Armies' crossings near Tașlîc and the difficulty of ammunition supply. When the preliminary assault finally began it was in cooperation with 46th Army in and around Cioburciu. 5th Shock's commander, Col. Gen. V. D. Tsvetaev, arrayed his two rifle corps in a single echelon; 37th Corps was to attack on the right wing while the 10th Guards Corps attacked on the left. The sector was defended by the 97th Jäger Division, which was able to concentrate its forces with the arrival of reinforcements from the 306th Infantry Division around Talmaza. This strongpoint was to be enveloped from the north and northwest while the 10th Guards Corps did the same from the south. Additional reinforcements from the 9th Infantry Division also arrived south of the village. As a result, and as described above, Tsvetaev's offensive collapsed of exhaustion after three days of heavy fighting and five more days of local battles for position before 5th Shock went over to the defense on May 4.

Prior to a new effort to drive into Bessarabia General Malinovskii carried out an extensive regrouping of his Front. Among other measures the 248th was reassigned to the 34th Guards Rifle Corps, which also contained the 203rd and 243rd Rifle Divisions. The Corps was then shifted to the north of Grigoriopol, being in position by May 10. The Front's orders called for an ambitious operation in mid-May to eliminate a German bridgehead on the east bank of the Dniestr, then to cross the river and help encircle the enemy forces facing 8th Guards Army farther south. 34th Guards Corps had 23rd Tank Corps plus two artillery and two mortar regiments in support, and the 243rd was in first echelon with the 203rd, with the 248th in second echelon on the left. After a 30-minute artillery preparation beginning at 0300 hours on May 14 the assault smashed the defenses of the battle group of 17th Infantry Division holding the line, and within hours had cleared the long salient of German troops. However, the position proved to be a trap. While the attackers could now fire into the rear of the German forces facing 8th Guards Army, those forces were still strong enough to continue constricting that Army's bridgehead. Meanwhile, the troops in the salient were supposed to continue their attack across the river, so they could not dig in, while they were taking fire from three sides. Within days it was clear that the position was untenable, and German counterattacks across the river had cut off the "bottle" by noon on May 17; the village of Koshnitsa was taken two days later. On the night of May 19/20 the remainder of the encircled men were forced to break out to their own lines. The 203rd Division, fighting alongside the 243rd, reported its highest casualties of any operation of the war; this was likely true for the 243rd as well but the 248th was relatively unscathed.

=== Second Jassy-Kishinev Offensive ===
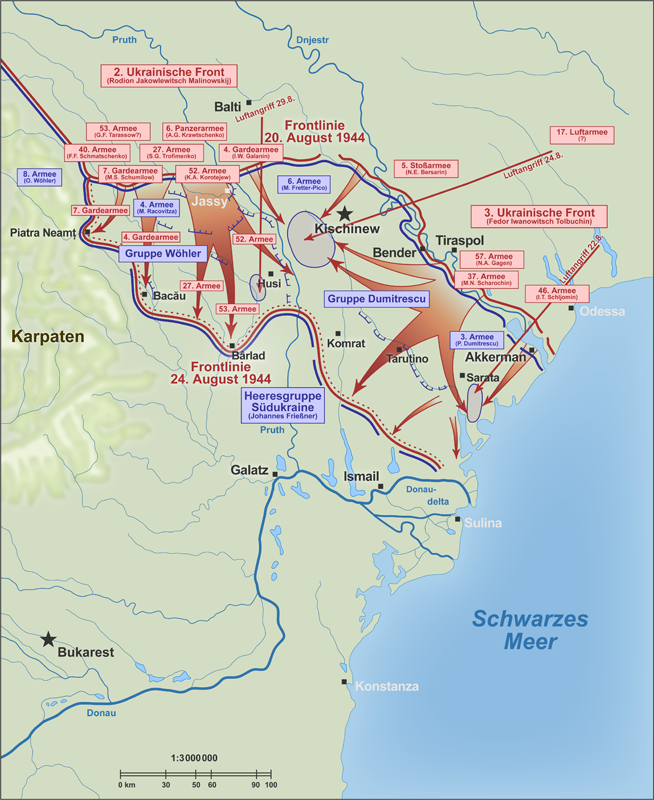
Second Jassy-Kishinev Offensive

During June the division came under direct Army command, where it remained into August. At the outset of the new offensive the initial objective of 5th Shock, now commanded by Lt. Gen. N. E. Berzarin, was to capture Chișinău by concentric attacks by concentric attacks from the north and east. The 248th remained under Army command and served as Berzarin's reserve. The Army was deployed on a 126km-wide front from Brăviceni to outside Bender. On August 24 the Chișinău group of Axis forces had been encircled and the city itself was taken, but the division remained in reserve. Over the following days the Army focused on the liquidation of this grouping while also preventing its escape over the Prut River. Organized resistance in the pocket was effectively over by day's end on August 26.

On September 10 the entire 5th Shock Army was removed to the Reserve of the Supreme High Command and began moving north. It was probably during this time, but certainly by February 1945, that the 248th received an organic battalion of SU-76 self-propelled guns, one of only 74 rifle divisions in the Red Army to be so equipped.

== Into Poland and Germany ==
On October 30 the 248th rejoined the active front as part of 5th Shock's 9th Rifle Corps in 1st Belorussian Front, which would soon come under command of Marshal G. K. Zhukov. 9th Corps, under Lt. Gen. Ivan Rosly, had the 230th and 301st Rifle Divisions under command as well. By the beginning of 1945 the 5th Shock was deployed along the Vistula River north of the bridgehead at Puławy.

The Vistula-Oder Offensive began at 0855 hours on January 14. According to Zhukov's plan 5th Shock was to enter the Front's bridgehead over the Vistula at Magnuszew, south of Warsaw, prior to its start, attack on the first day and break through the German defense on a 6km-wide front along the Wybrowa–Stszirzina sector, supported by the artillery of the 2nd Guards Tank Army, and was then to develop the attack in the general direction of Branków and Goszczyn. Once the breakthrough was made the armor units and subunits in direct support of the Army's infantry were to unite as a mobile detachment to seize the second German defensive zone from the march with the goal of reaching the area of Bronisławów to Biała Rawska by the fourth day.

The offensive began with a reconnaissance-in-force following a 25-minute artillery preparation by all the Front's artillery. On the 5th Shock's and 8th Guards Army's sectors this quickly captured 3-4 lines of German trenches. The main forces of these Armies took advantage of this early success and began advancing behind a rolling barrage, gaining as much as 12-13km during the day and through the night before going over to the pursuit on January 15. During January 18-19 the Front's mobile forces covered more than 100km while the combined-arms armies advanced 50-55km. On January 26 Zhukov informed the STAVKA of his plans to continue the offensive. 5th Shock Army would attack in the general direction of Neudamm and then force the Oder River in the area of Alt Blessin before continuing to advance towards Nauen. On January 28 the 2nd Guards Tank and 5th Shock Armies broke through the Pomeranian Wall from the march and by the end of the month reached the Oder south of Küstrin and seized a bridgehead 12km in width and up to 3km deep. This would prove to be the limit of 5th Shock's advance until April. In recognition of this success the division received the Order of the Red Banner on April 5.

=== Battle of Berlin ===
At the start of the Berlin operation the 5th Shock was one of four combined-arms armies that made up the main shock group of 1st Belorussian Front. The Army deployed within the Küstrin bridgehead along a 9km-wide front between Letschin and Golzow and was to launch its main attack on its left wing on a 7km sector closer to the latter place. The 9th Corps had the 301st Division in the first echelon and the 248th in the second; the 230th was serving as the Army's reserve. All three divisions had between 5,000 and 6,000 personnel on strength. The Army had an average of 43 tanks and self-propelled guns on each kilometre of the breakthrough front.

In the days just before the offensive the 3rd Shock Army was secretly deployed into the bridgehead which required considerable regrouping and covering operations by elements of 5th Shock. The Army then occupied jumping-off positions for a reconnaissance-in-force by battalions of five of its divisions while the remainder carried out more regular reconnaissance activities beginning early on the morning of April 14. The 248th's reconnaissance battalion, which was operating jointly with reconnaissance units from the 47th Army's 82nd Rifle Division, seized the first German trench in the area of marker 7.1. In the course of two days of limited fighting the Front's troops advanced as much as 5km, ascertained and partly disrupted the German defensive system, and had overcome the thickest zone of minefields. The German command was also misled as to when the main offensive would occur.

In the event that offensive began on April 16. 5th Shock attacked at 0520 hours, following a 20-minute artillery preparation and with the aid of 36 searchlights. 9th Corps, with only the 301st in first echelon, had advanced 6km by the end of the day and seized Werbig. As a whole the Army broke through all three positions of the main German defensive zone, reached the second defensive position, and captured 400 prisoners. The next day 5th Shock resumed its offensive at 0700 hours, following a 10-minute artillery preparation. The Corps committed the 248th into battle and was cooperating with part of the 11th Tank Corps of 2nd Guards Tank Army. It spent most of the day engaged in stubborn fighting for the German strongpoint at Gusow, finally securing it by evening and, having now broken through both the first and second intermediate positions, reached a line from the eastern outskirts of Hermersdorf to the eastern bank of the Haussee, representing a total advance of 13km for the day. On April 18 the Corps, still backed by 11th Tanks, advanced 3km in stubborn fighting and by the end of the day had reached the area of Münchehofe. The following day it battled 11th SS Panzergrenadier Division Nordland for possession of the strongpoint of Buckow after a further advance of 6km; it had now reached and partially broken through the third German defensive zone.

On April 20 the Corps continued attacking to the west with two divisions in the first echelon. The advance was made through an area of lakes and swamps but nevertheless gained 6km, reaching a line from outside Hohenstein to Garzin, reaching the outer defense line of Berlin proper. The next day the Corps secured the Army's left flank, fighting in the area south of Altlandsberg, bringing it to the northeastern outskirts of the city. In heavy fighting on April 22 it cleared the area of Dahlwitz and Kaulsdorf and after an advance of 16km began fighting for the eastern part of Karlshorst.

By the end of the day on April 23 the 9th Corps had penetrated into the central part of Berlin, having advanced up to 4km. General Berzarin now received orders to develop the offensive along the eastern and western banks of the Spree and, in conjunction with 3rd Shock Army, to take the northern half of Berlin. During April 26 the 9th Corps attacked along the south bank of the Spree between it and the Landwehr Canal. In the course of the fighting that day 5th Shock secured 115 city blocks. The next day the Corps exploited the successes of 8th Guards Army on its left to reach the line of the Wallstrasse–the Seydelstrasse–the Alte Jakobstrasse, clearing another 40 blocks. On April 28 it attacked toward the Tiergarten, clearing Anhalt Station from the south and closing to within 1,000m of the objective.

== Postwar ==
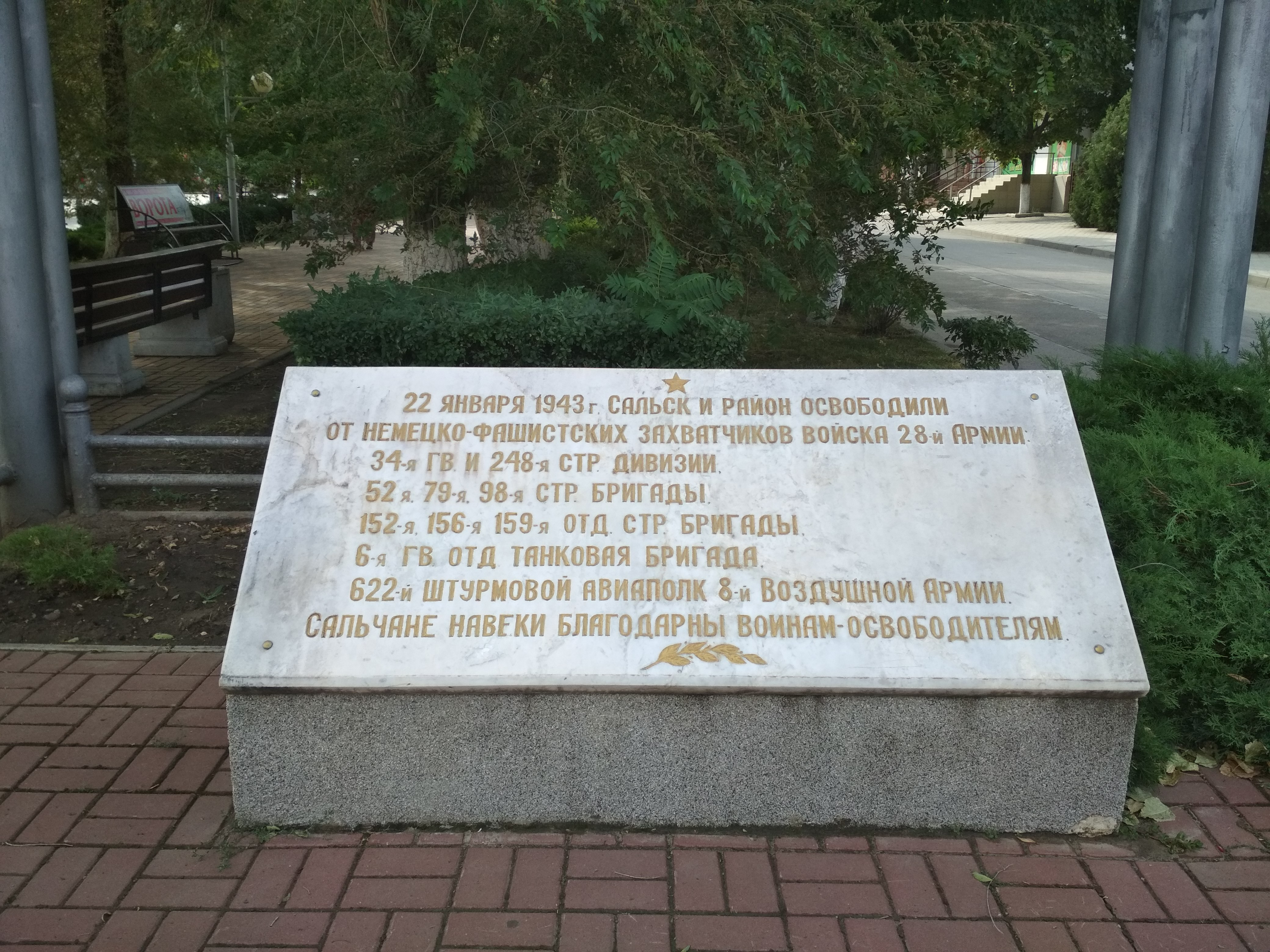
Memorial to the 28th Army, including the 248th Rifle Division, at Salsk

Berlin capitulated on May 2. On the same day all three rifle regiments of the 248th were awarded the city's name as an honorific. On May 28 all four regiments of the 248th were decorated for their achievements in the battle outside and within the city. The 899th and 902nd Rifle Regiments each received the Order of Kutuzov, 3rd Degree, while the 905th Regiment was given the Order of Bogdan Khmelnitsky, 2nd Degree, and the 771st Artillery Regiment was granted the Order of Alexander Nevsky. According to STAVKA Order No. 11095 of the following day, part 2, the 5th Shock Army, with its 9th Corps, was to be transferred to the Group of Soviet Forces in Germany by June 3. In further awards decreed on June 11 the 442nd Sapper Battalion and the 664th Signal Battalion were each awarded the Order of the Red Star for their roles in the Berlin operation. A composite rifle regiment of the 248th took part in the Berlin Victory Parade on September 7. In March 1946 General Galai left the division to attend the Military Academy of the General Staff. In October the 248th was disbanded along with 9th Corps and 5th Shock Army.
