= Draganov =

Draganov is a surname. Notable people with this surname include:

- Dragomir Draganov (footballer) (born 1981), Bulgarian footballer
- Dragomir Draganov (historian) (1948-2019), Bulgarian historian and politician
- Pyotr Draganov (1857–1928), Russian philologist
- Stefan Draganov (born 1966), former Bulgarian footballer
- Traicho Draganov, Bulgarian sprint canoer
- Draganov (rapper) (born 1995), Moroccan rapper
