= Drahomír =

Slavic masculine given name

- Pronunciation: Slovak: [ˈdraɦɔmiːr]
- Gender: masculine

Origin
- Language: Slavic
- Region of origin: Czech Republic, Slovakia

Other names
- Derived: drag (dear, precious) and mir (peace)
- Related names: Drahomíra (f), Dragomir

Drahomír is a Slavic masculine given name. It is the Czech and Slovak form of the given name Dragomir. The female form of the name is Drahomíra.

The name is derived from the Slavic elements drag (dear, precious) and mir (peace) and can be translated as "To whom peace is precious" or "He who cares about peace".

Notable people with the name include:

- Drahomír Blažej (born 1962), Czech politician
- Drahomír Jirotka (1915–1958), Czech ice hockey player
- Drahomír Kadlec (born 1965), Czech ice hockey player
- Drahomír Koudelka (1946–1992), Czech volleyball player

== See also ==
- Drahomíra, female form of the name
- Dragomir, South Slavic form of the name
