= Postage stamps and postal history of Eastern Rumelia =

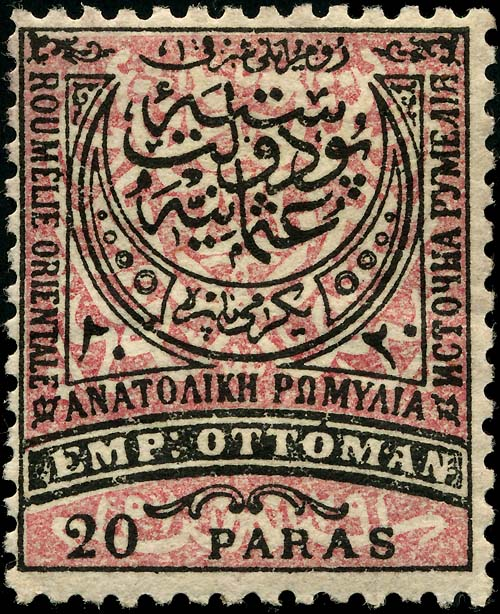
The design of the stamps of 1881 and 1884 listed the name of the province in four languages – Turkish, French, Greek, and Bulgarian – using four alphabets – Arabic, Latin, Greek, and Cyrillic

Eastern Rumelia or Eastern Roumelia was an autonomous province (vilayet) in the Ottoman Empire from 1878 to 1908; however, it was under Bulgarian control beginning in 1885 (see Bulgarian unification). The province is remembered today by philatelists for having issued postage stamps from 1881 on, although a postcard was issued locally for internal use in 1880.

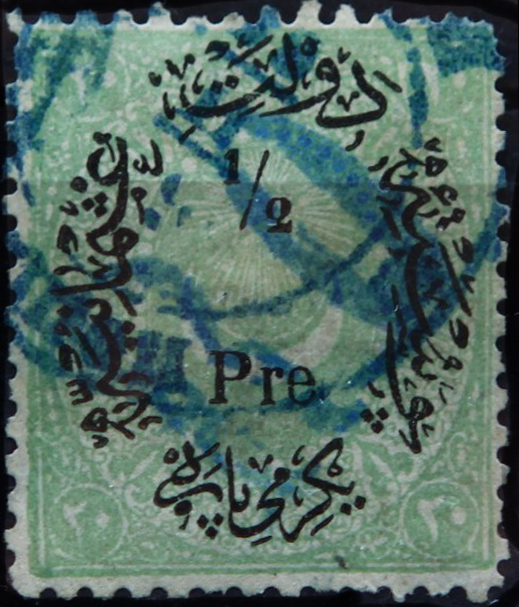
"R.O." Overprint on an already overprinted stamp of the Ottoman Empire (Duloz-Issue).

The 1878 Treaty of Berlin provided for the Ottoman Empire to issue special stamps for Eastern Rumelia. However, they were slow to do so. In 1880, in part a reaction to the local postcard, the Turkish government sent some 50,000 piasters worth of Turkish stamps overprinted with "ROUMELIE / ORIENTALE" in an oval. The Eastern Rumelian government found these to be unsatisfactory in presenting the province as an autonomous region, and refused to issue them. A compromise was reached, new stamps specifically printed for Eastern Rumelia were sent from Constantinople and both versions were issued on 16 January 1881.

Overprints on stamps of Turkey were made locally. First was an "R.O." that was stamped both on regular Turkish stamps and the oval overprinted ones. This was done in Philippopolis. In addition, a pattern of bars was sometimes used. All of these overprints are uncommon and extensively counterfeited.

The stamps that were specifically printed for Eastern Rumelia used design elements from the existing Ottoman postage stamps, differing from them by having the Greek inscription Ανατολική Ρωμυλία (Anatolian (i.e. Eastern) Rumelia) above the "Emp. Ottoman" and with French and Bulgarian inscriptions of the name in small letters along the left and right sides. In 1884, a 5 paras stamp and a ten paras stamp of a second issue of this design, with changed colors, were issued. Higher denominations for the 1884 issue were prepared, but not issued. Both of these sets, 1881 and 1884, were printed in Constantinople. Most of these types are quite common, but perforation variations can be scare.

On September 10, 1885, the existing Rumelian issues were overprinted with two different images of the Bulgarian lion, and then with the lion in a frame and "Bulgarian Post" in Bulgarian (Cyrillic letters). As with the first overprints, these are uncommon, with prices ranging from US$6–200, and counterfeits are widespread. From 1886 on, the province used Bulgarian stamps.

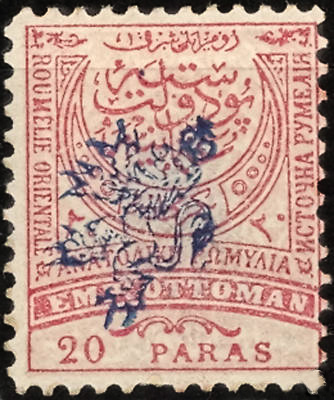
Stamp overprinted with the image of the Bulgarian lion

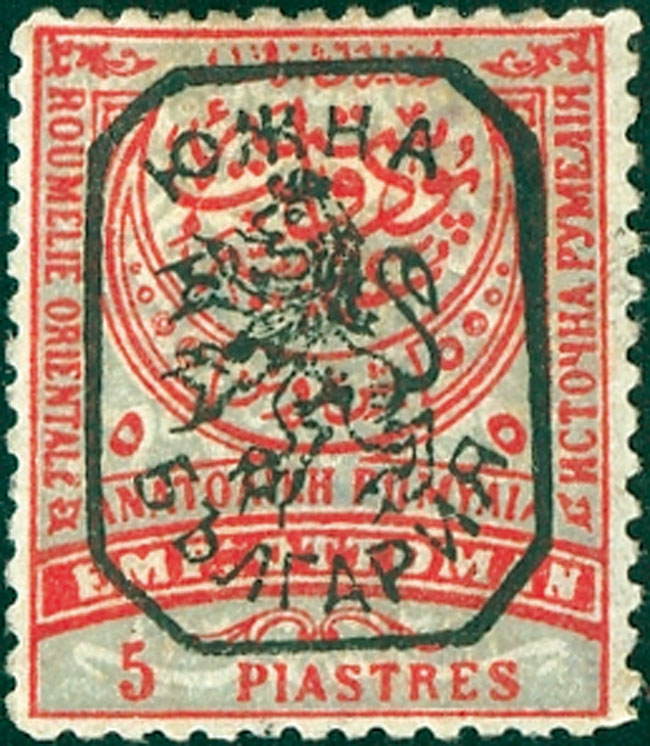
Stamp overprinted with the image of the Bulgarian lion

== See also ==
- Postage stamps and postal history of Bulgaria
- Dragomir Zagorsky
