= Drahomíra (name) =

Slavic feminine given name

- Pronunciation: Czech: [ˈdraɦomiːra]
- Gender: feminine

Origin
- Origin: Slavic

Other names
- Derived: dorgu ("dear, precious") and mir ("peace")
- Related names: Drahomír, Dragomir

Drahomíra is a traditional Czech and Slovak female given name derived from the Slavic elements dorgu ("dear, precious") and mir ("peace"). It means precious and peaceful. The male form of the name is Drahomír. Nicknames are Draha, Drahuše, Drahusha, Drahomirka, Draga, Mira, Mirka.

Drahomíra's name day in the Czech Republic is 18 July, in Slovakia 16 January. Its equivalent in Polish, Bulgarian, Serbian and Croatian languages is Dragomira (with male form Dragomir).

Drahomíra, a Bohemian duchess, is the most famous historical bearer of the name.

== Notable people with the name ==
- Drahomíra of Stodor (c. 877 or 890–died after 934 or 936), Duchess consort of Bohemia
- Drahomíra Miklošová (born 1953), Czech politician
- Drahomíra Smolíková (born 1959), Czech gymnast
- Drahomíra Vihanová (1930–2017), Czech film director, documentarian and screenwriter

== See also ==
- Drahomira, genus of molluscs
- Drahomír, male form of the name
