= Dragomirna (disambiguation) =

Dragomirna may refer to the following places in Romania:

- Dragomirna Monastery, a monastery in Suceava County
- Dragomirna, a village in the commune Mitocu Dragomirnei, Suceava County
- Dragomirna (Suceava), a tributary of the Suceava in Suceava County
- Dragomira, a tributary of the Șușița in Vrancea County

== See also ==
- Drăgan (disambiguation)
