= Mitoc, Orhei =

- Commune and village
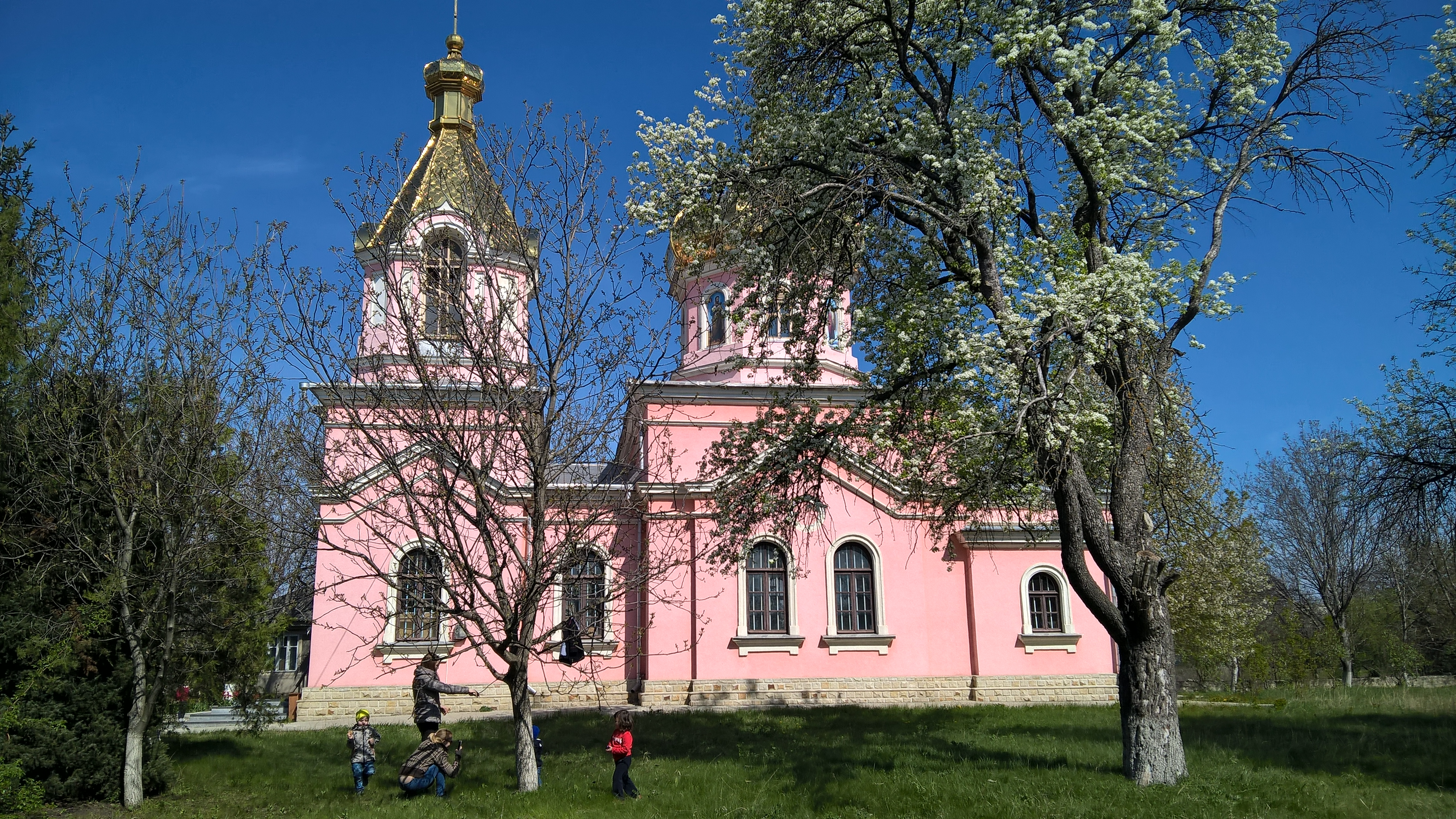
- "Covering of the Virgin Mary" Church in Mitoc

- Location in Moldova
- Coordinates: 47°23′N 28°47′E
- Country: Moldova
- District: Orhei District

Population (2014 census)
  - Total: 2,742
- Time zone: UTC+2 (EET)
  - Summer (DST): UTC+3 (EEST)

Mitoc (Russian: Миток, Ukrainian: Міток) is a village in Orhei District, Moldova with a population of 2,742.

== History ==
The first mention of the village dates back to 1659. The foundation stone for the construction of the Church "Covering of the Virgin Mary" was laid in 1897. The village was previously known as Vadul Iazului.

In the past, the main occupations of the villagers were fishing, animal husbandry, agriculture and the reed trade, which was essential for roofing houses. In 1932, the village suffered a major flood, and a portion of the residents were relocated 2 kilometers away, where the village of Pelivan is currently located.

The first collective farm was formed in 1949, alongside the estates of Brăviceni village. In 1965, the "Luceafărul" sovkhoz (state farm) was established, focusing largely on vegetable cultivation, animal husbandry, and grain production. In 1987, the sovkhoz was merged with the Beef Cattle Breeding Complex, forming the "Inter-farm Enterprise for Beef Production", which was one of the largest in the republic. In 1997, the collective farm was privatized. This led to the formation of 581 individual peasant farms and several forms of land management, including individual ownership, leasing etc.
