= Postage stamps and postal history of Bulgaria =

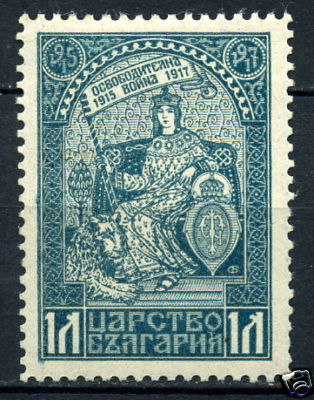
A World War I stamp

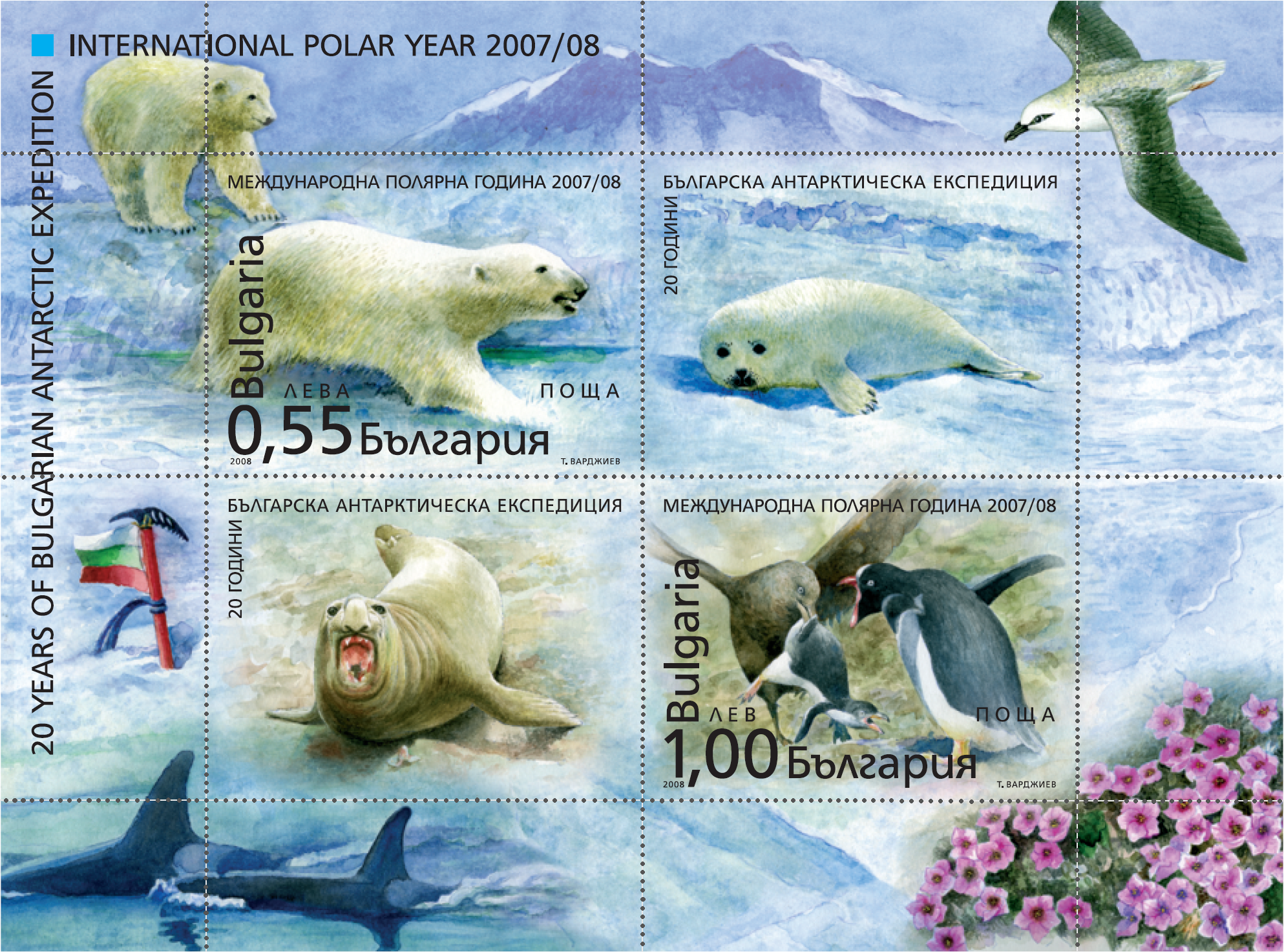
2007 stamp commemorating 20 years of the Bulgarian Antarctic Expedition

Bulgaria liberated itself from the Ottoman Empire in 1878 and, although it remained de jure autonomous until the proclamation of full independence in 1908, it acted as a de facto independent country. From 1879, stamps were issued in Bulgarian Cyrillic script and some of the stamps—such as those issued in 1901—commemorated the 25th anniversary of the April Uprising against the Turks and, in 1902, celebrated the 25th anniversary of the Battle of Shipka. Bulgaria become a de jure independent state in 1908, even though early stamps issued in the 1910s still depicted Tsar Ferdinand and Tsar Boris III.

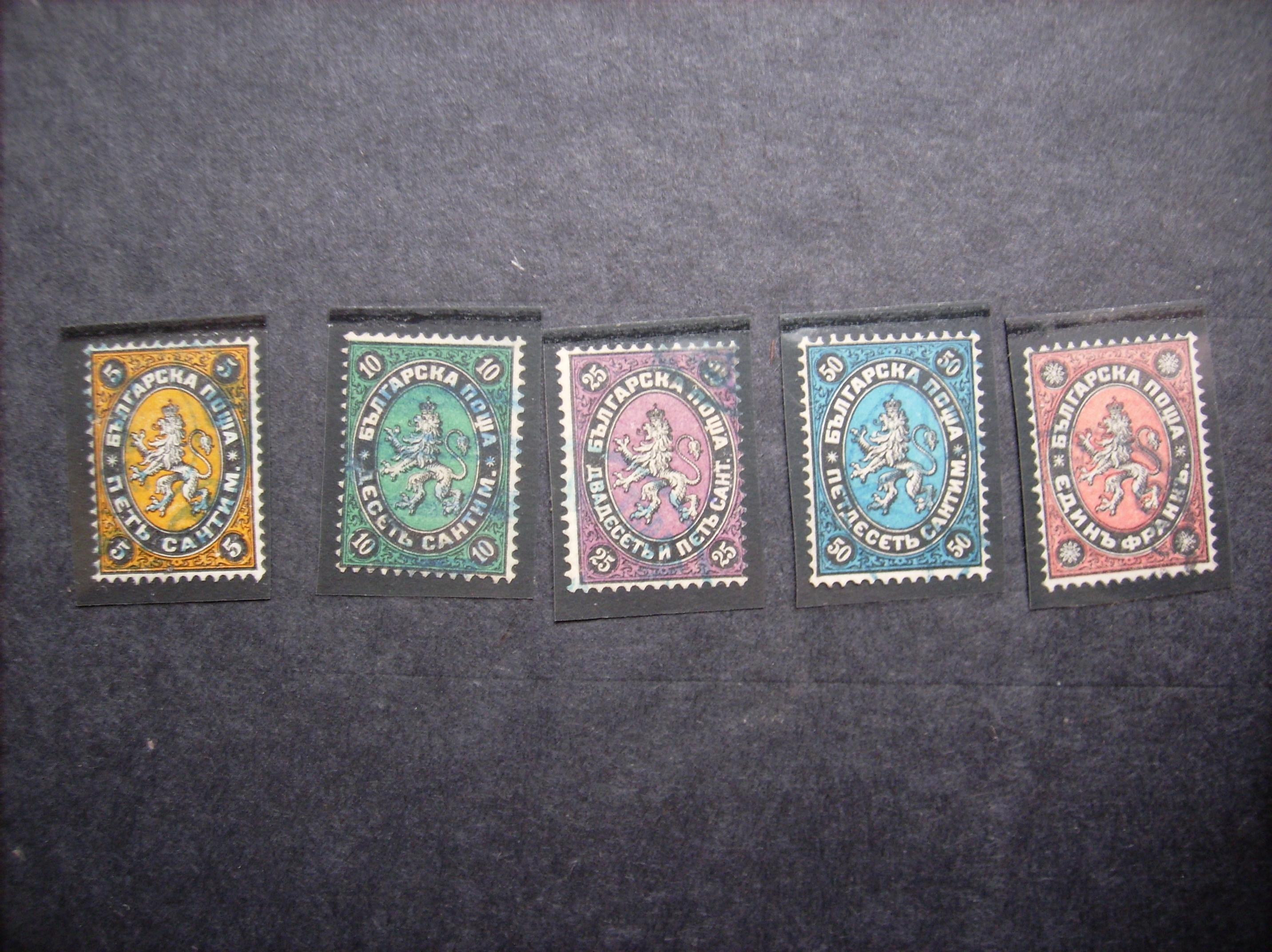
The First Bulgarian Stamps issued on May 1, 1879

== See also ==
- Bulgarian Posts
- Postage stamps and postal history of Eastern Rumelia
- Dragomir Zagorsky
