= Dragomirna (Suceava) =

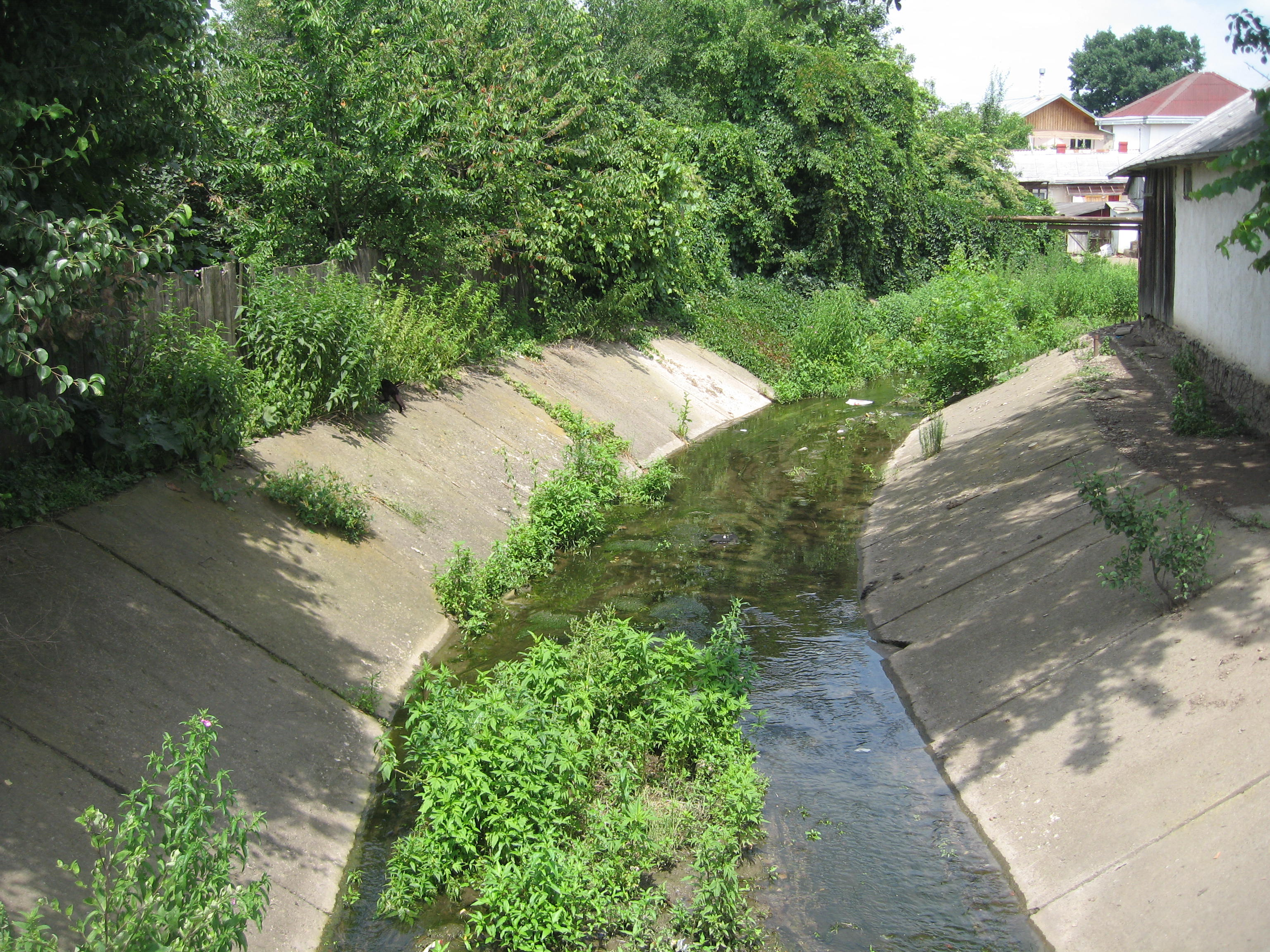

- Location within Romania

Location
- Country: Romania
- Counties: Suceava County
- Villages: Mitocu Dragomirnei, Lipoveni

Physical characteristics
- Mouth: Suceava
  - location: Suceava
  - coordinates: 47.6717°N 26.2487°E
- Length: 16 km (9.9 mi)
- Basin size: 34 km^{2} (13 sq mi)

Basin features
- Progression: Suceava→ Siret→ Danube→ Black Sea

The Dragomirna is a left tributary of the river Suceava in Romania. It flows into the Suceava in the city Suceava. Its length is 16 km (9.9 mi) and its basin size is 34 km^{2} (13 sq mi). Its lowermost course is shared with the river Mitoc, another left tributary of the Suceava.
