= Bulgarian Posts =

Postal service of Bulgaria

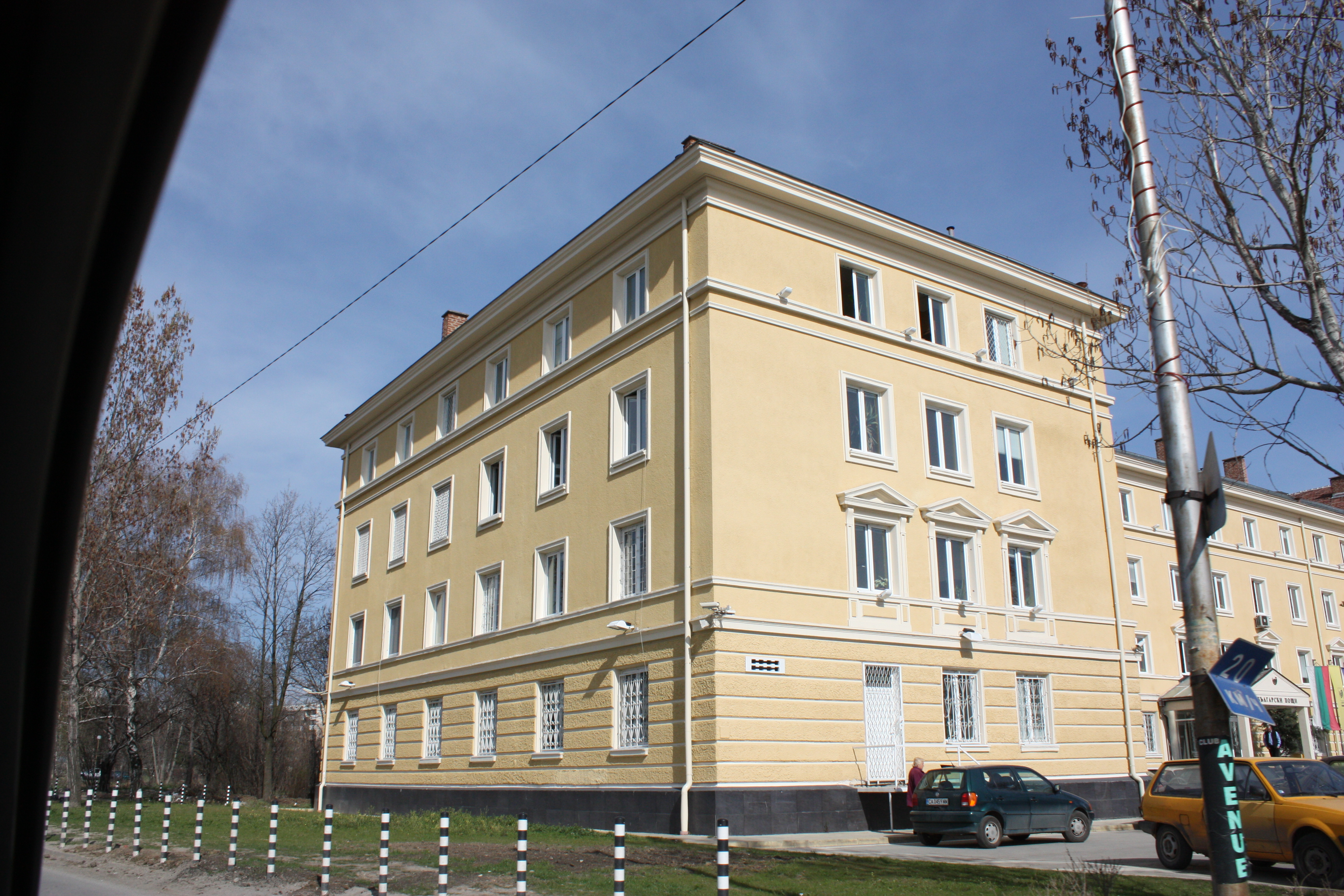
- Bulgarian Posts headquarters in Sofia
- Type: Joint stock company (state-owned)
- Industry: Postal services, Courier
- Founded: 1879; 147 years ago
- Headquarters: Sofia, Bulgaria
- Key people: Tzvetilia Stoilkova (CEO)
- Services: Letter post, parcel service, EMS
- Number of employees: ~13,000 (2016)
- Website: bgpost.bg

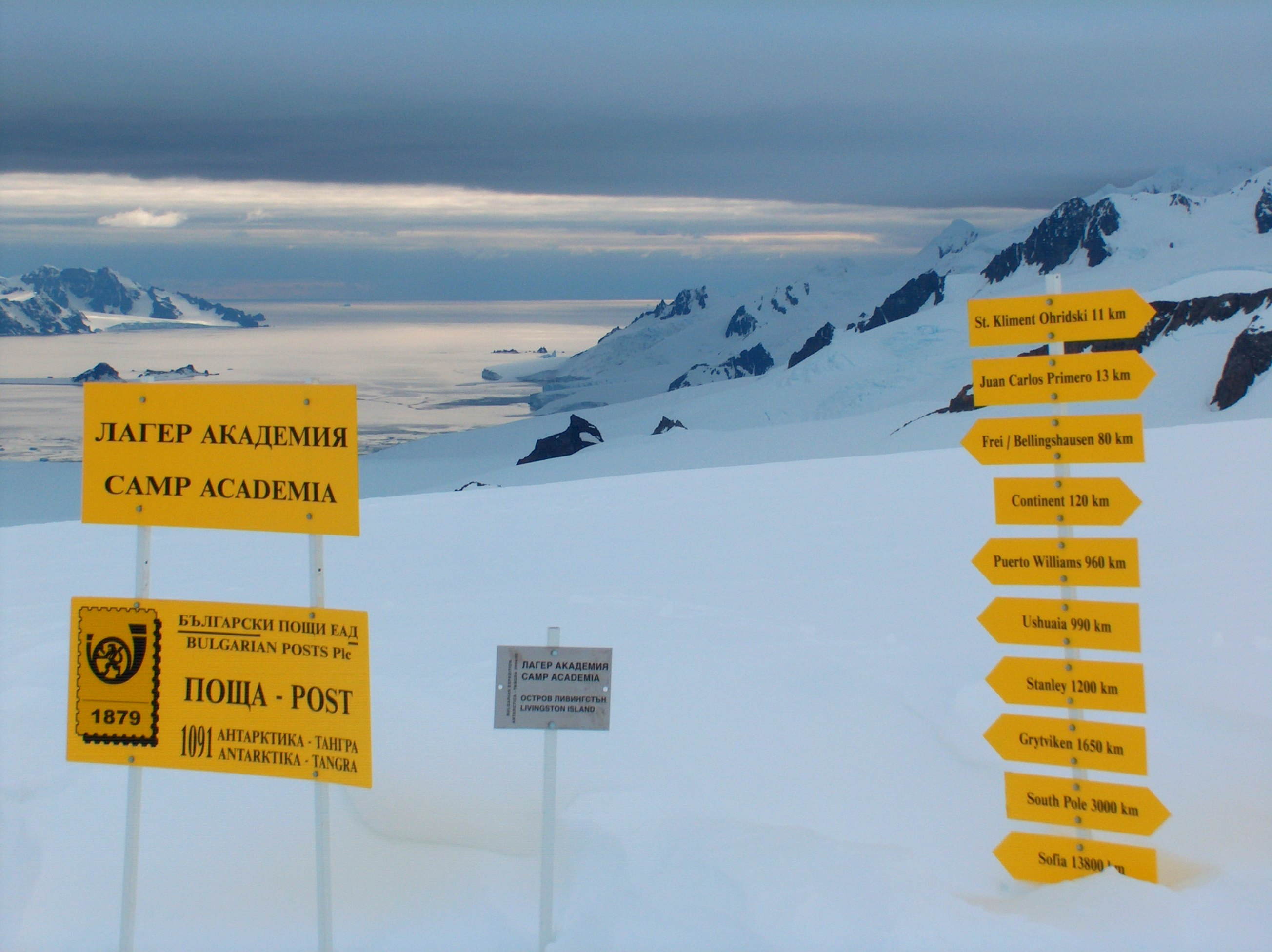
The post office at Camp Academia, Livingston Island, Antarctica is the southernmost Bulgarian Posts office in the world

The Bulgarian Posts (Bulgarian: Български пощи, romanized: Balgarski poshti) are the national postal service of Bulgaria. The company was established in 1992. Although it was transformed into a joint-stock company in 1997, it is fully owned by the state.

== History ==
It traces its origin to the Bulgarian Posts and Telecommunications company, was founded as the Bulgarian Posts and Telegraphs after the Liberation of Bulgaria from Ottoman rule, as the provisional Russian administration handed over all post and telegraph offices to the newly restored Bulgarian state in 1879. It joined the General Postal Union in the same year.

Following the end of World War II and the establishment of the People's Republic of Bulgaria the Ministry of Railways, Posts and Telegraphs of Bulgaria was dissolved and divided into two organizations: Ministry of Railways, Roads and Water Communications and Ministry of Posts, Telegraphs and Telephones which operated the postal system. From 1957 the Ministry of Post was merged back into the Ministry of Transport and Communications and the post was under its jurisdiction. In 1981 the postal department and telecommunications department were united to form a state-owned company, the Bulgarian Post and Telecommunications (Bulgarian: Български пощи и далекосъобщения). In 1992 following the demise of the communist regime and the establishment of modern Bulgaria, the regulatory part was given to the newly created Committee for Post and Telecommunications, and the company itself split into two separate entities: the Bulgarian Posts took over postal activities while the telecommunication section was incorporated as a separate company.

On March 31, 1997, "Bulgarian Posts" EOOD was transformed into a joint-stock company.

In 2005, the company operated with 3,008 post offices and a total length of 80,060 km with the postal route. The company was a monopoly in the country in providing universal postal service until 2006.

As of 2016, Bulgarian Posts reported operating 2,981 post offices and 4,814 mailboxes.

== See also ==
- Postage stamps and postal history of Bulgaria
- Bulgarian Postbank
