= Drahomíra Miklošová =

Czech politician

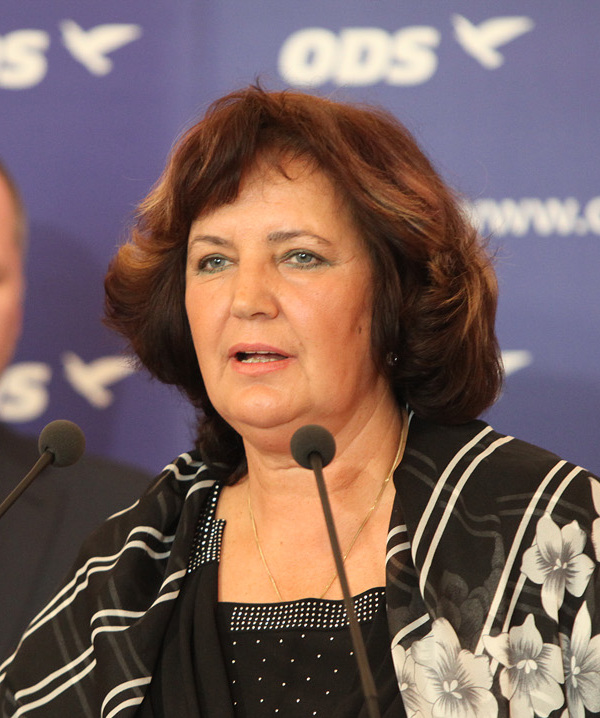
- Miklošová in 2014

Vice-Chairwoman of the Civic Democratic Party
- Incumbent
- Assumed office 16 January 2016

Mayor of Obrnice
- Incumbent
- Assumed office 16 November 2010
- Preceded by: Stanislav Zaspal

Personal details
- Born: 3 March 1953 (age 73)
- Party: ODS

Drahomíra Miklošová (born 3 March 1953) is a Czech politician and a member of the Civic Democratic Party. She is a Mayor of Obrnice. She became widely known for successful integration of local Roma People. She was voted vice-chairwoman of the Civic Democratic Party in 2016. She remained in the position until January 2018.
