= Dragomirovo =

Dragomirovo (Cyrillic: Драгомирово) is the name of the following settlements:

- Dragomirovo, Pernik Province, Bulgaria
- Dragomirovo, Veliko Tarnovo Province, Bulgaria
- Dragomirovo, Tajikistan, in Sughd province
