= Egorlykskaya (air base) =

Former airport in Rostov Oblast, Russia

Egorlykskaya
- Zernograd, Rostov Oblast in Russia
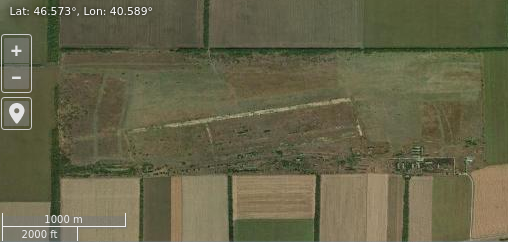
- Satellite imagery of the former Egorlykskaya air base

Site information
- Type: Air Base
- Owner: Ministry of Defence
- Operator: Russian Air Force

Location
- Shown within Rostov Oblast Egorlykskaya (Russia)
- Coordinates: 46°34′24″N 40°35′22″E

Site history
- Built: 1992
- In use: 1992 - 2010

Airfield information
- Elevation: 10 metres (33 ft) AMSL
Runways
Direction	Length and surface
07/25	1,500 metres (4,921 ft) Concrete

Egorlykskaya is a former airbase of the Russian Air Force located 37 kilometres (23 mi) south-east of Zernograd, Rostov Oblast, Russia.

The base was home to the 325th Independent Helicopter Regiment between 1992 and 2010 with the Mil Mi-8 (ASCC: Hip), Mil Mi-6 (ASCC: Hook) & Mil Mi-26 (ASCC: Halo).

Since September 2023, as part of the Russian invasion of Ukraine, it has been used for storage of North Korean ammunition.

== See also ==
- List of military airbases in Russia
