= Dragomir Brzak =

Serbian dramatist, poet, translator and travel writer

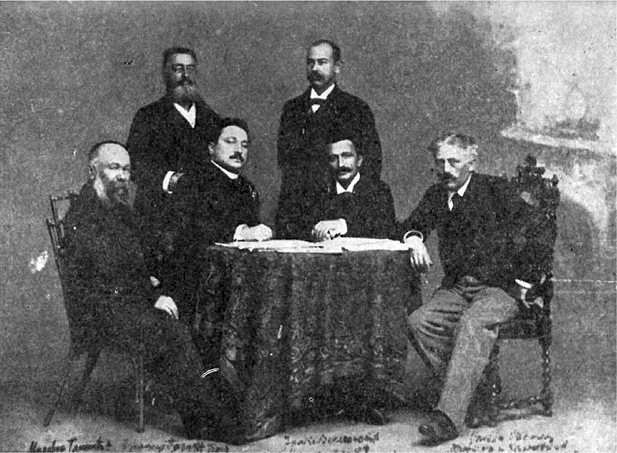
A group of Serbian writers; Brzak is standing on the left

Dragomir Brzak (Belgrade, Principality of Serbia, 21 February 1851 – Belgrade, Kingdom of Serbia, 4 March 1905) was a Serbian dramatist, poet, translator and travel writer. Most of his poetry was turned into song. He is also remembered for translating Shakespeare's "Midsummer Night's Dream."

== Biography ==
He was born in Belgrade, Serbia, on 21 February 1851, and educated at Belgrade's Velika škola and Vienna's School of Telegraphy. During the Serbian-Turkish Wars he voluntarily enlisted as a telegraphist in the Serbian Military Headquarters.

After the war, he spent much of his time in the Bohemian quarter of the old section of the Serbian capital called Skadarlija, socializing with friends, actors, poets, and artists. A government appointment was secured for him by his uncle. As a postal clerk and telegraphist, he had plenty of time to devote to his literary pursuits.

He was never considered a popular writer, and the quiet grace of his style and his refusal to pander to the popular taste in the morals and incidents of his work may have disqualified him from popularity. His numerous travel writings, Sa Avale na Bosforu: putne beleške sa pohoda Beogradskog pevačkog društva (1897) and U Komisiji: svakojake slike i prilike iz mojeg beležnika (1902) achieved a respectable following. He also translated several foreign dramas for the Serbian theatre, including Shakespeare's "Midsummer Night's Dream."

His companions and collaborators were Janko Veselinović and Stevan Sremac. The famous play "Djido" is one of several which he wrote with Janko Veselinović and—the novelist (Veselinović) usually contributing the story and the dramatist (Brzak) the theatrical working up. Brzak also collaborated with Stevan Sremac on "Ivkova Slava" in adapting it for the theater. Literary critic Jovan Skerlić mentions Dragomir Brzak for his effort in "The History of Modern Serbian Literature" (Istorija nove srpske književnosti).

Brzak soon ranked with the two undisputed leaders of Serbian dramatic art -- Branislav Nušić and Milovan Glišić. He could not match the prolific power, the eloquent and moral vigor of the former (Nušić), nor the passionate conviction and powerful humor of the latter (Glišić), but Brzak was a master of clever and easy flowing dialogue. He adhered to Scribe's constructive methods, which combined the three old kinds of comedy—the comedy of character, the manners and of intrigue—with drama bourgeois, and blended the heterogeneous elements into a compact body and living unity. He ridiculed the vulgar and selfish middle-class and at the same time opened a wider field to social satire.

Brzak struck a new vein by introducing a strong historical element in some of the dramatic romances. A series of melodramatic pageants (tableaux) from the national life, richly garnished with songs and dances, was a characteristic feature of the domestic repertoire, conjuring up the idyllic picture of the native land and alleviating the homesickness.

Then came the motion to limit the musical performances to theatrical plays with singing, like "Djido", based on the story written by Janko Veselinović, but adapted for the stage by Brzak, with music by Slovenian composer Davorin Jenko, then living in Belgrade. The Serbian Singspiel approached the "singspiel" style of the German composer Carl Maria von Weber, though the Serbian storyline was influenced by the Russian school of the time. He is also known for shortening a popular patriotic song Oj Srbijo, mila mati.

Brzak died in Belgrade on 4 March 1905.

He was awarded Order of Osmanieh, Bulgarian Order For Civil Merit, Order of Prince Danilo I, Order of Saint Sava, Order of the White Eagle and Order of the Cross of Takovo.

== Sources ==
- Jovan Skerlić, Istorija nove srpske književnosti, Belgrade, 1914 and 1921
