= Drahomír Jirotka =

Czech ice hockey player

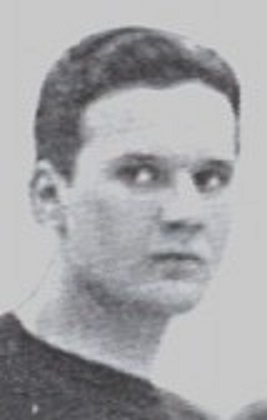
- Jirotka in 1938
- Born: 20 September 1915; Prostějov, Austria-Hungary
- Died: 21 February 1958 (aged 42); Glasgow, Scotland
- National team: Czechoslovakia

Drahomír Jirotka (20 September 1915 – 21 February 1958) was a Czechoslovak ice hockey player. He competed in the men's tournament at the 1936 Winter Olympics.
