= Mitoc (river) =

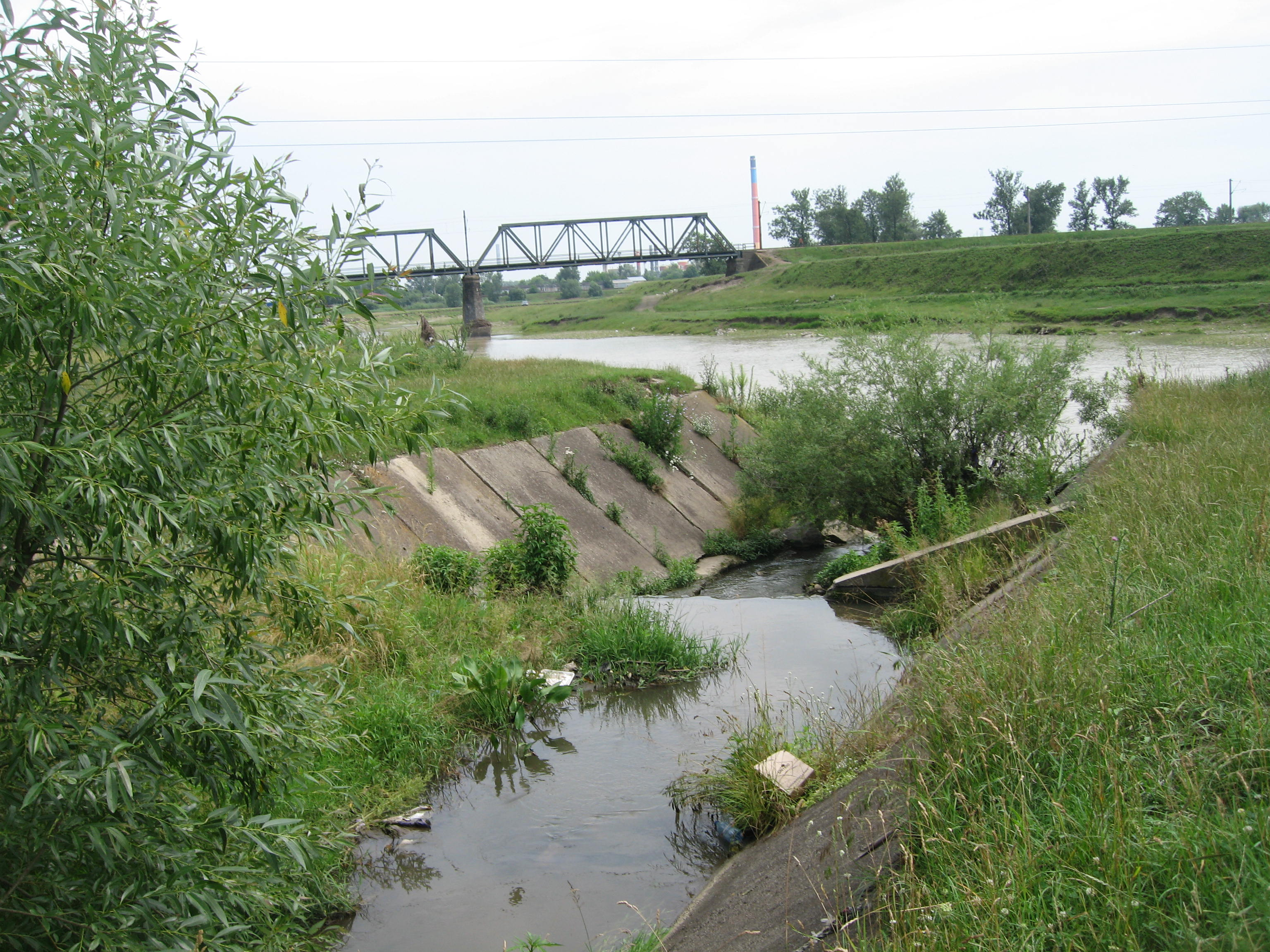
- The Mitoc near its outflow into the Suceava

- Location within Romania

Location
- Country: Romania
- Counties: Suceava County

Physical characteristics
- Mouth: Suceava
  - location: Suceava
  - coordinates: 47.6717°N 26.2487°E
- Length: 10 km (6.2 mi)
- Basin size: 17 km^{2} (6.6 sq mi)

Basin features
- Progression: Suceava→ Siret→ Danube→ Black Sea

The Mitoc is a left tributary of the river Suceava in Romania. It flows into the Suceava in the city Suceava. Its length is 10 km (6.2 mi) and its basin size is 17 km^{2} (6.6 sq mi). Its lowermost course is shared with the river Dragomirna, another left tributary of the Suceava.

== Gallery ==
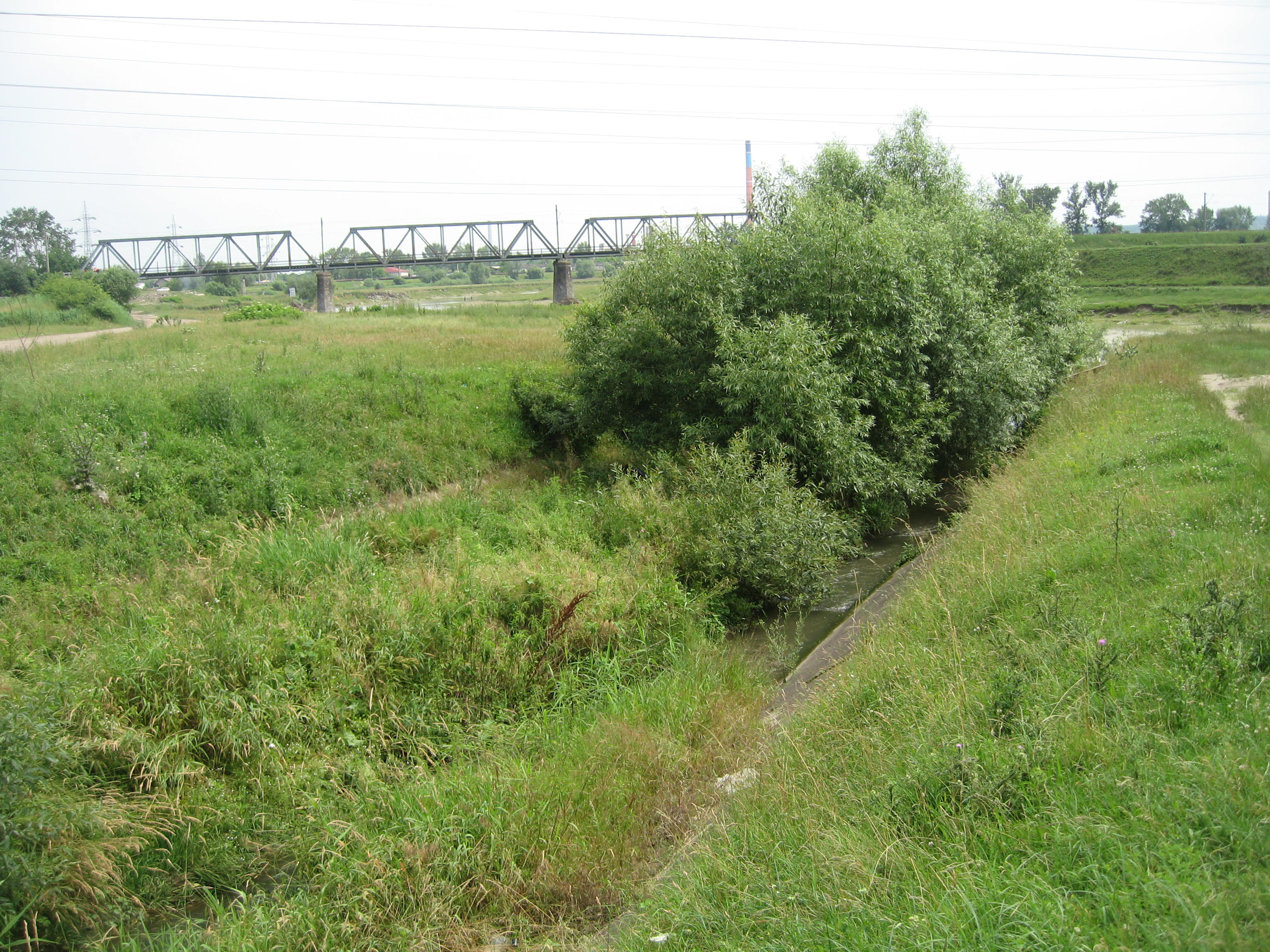
The downstream reach of the Mitoc

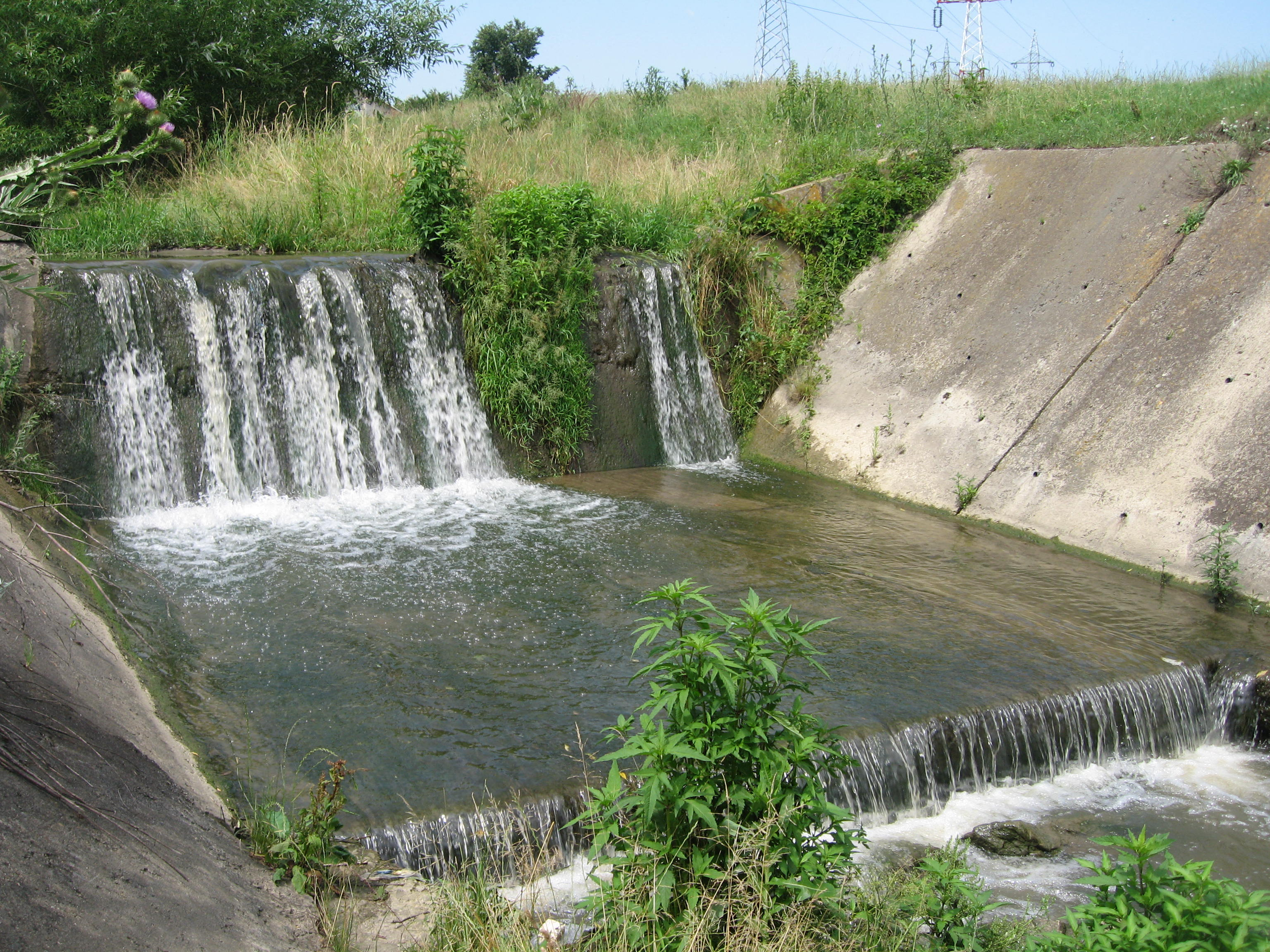
River training works on the Mitoc near the discharge into the Suceava
