= Dragomir Glišić =

Serbian artist

Dragomir Glišić (Valjevo, Principality of Serbia, 1 March 1872 – Belgrade, Yugoslavia, 17 June 1957) was a Serbian painter and war photographer.

== Biography ==
Dragomir was born on 1 March 1872 in Valjevo. His parents were Stojan, a city barber, and Milica, a housewife. Dragomir was one of six children. He finished elementary school in his hometown. But due to family poverty, he dropped out of school. From an early age, he showed a talent for drawing, and his first noteworthy work was a portrait of a fellow citizen, the writer Ljubomir Nenadović. When the elderly writer saw his portrait, he liked it, and he decided to help young Glišić. Not only did he encourage him, but he also helped him financially as a patron, and supported him to continue his artistic training. Then he gathered rich people from Valjevo to jointly give financial support to a talented boy. When his parents died soon after, and also Nenadović, Dragomir went to Belgrade. As soon as he heard that the first private Art School in the city was opening, he enrolled in the art classes. In September 1895, he became a student of that school for future painters-artists. He acquired his painting education with Kiril Kutlik at the Serbian School of Drawing and Painting (1895–1898). He continued his studies at the Academy of Arts in Munich (1899–1904) along with his compatriot artist Kosta Miličević. He was also engaged in pedagogical work in Belgrade between 1909 and 1927 as a drawing teacher at the Third Belgrade Gymnasium. He took part in the Balkan Wars and the First World War between 1912 and 1918. His platoon was the last to withdraw from the Belgrade fortress, continuing street battles with the enemy in 1916.

== War painter and photographer ==
As a conscript, he participated in the Balkan wars as a war painter of the Danube Division. He participated in the First World War as a war artist and photographer, first in the 7th Regiment of the First Army of the Danube Division (until his arrival in Corfu). After an exhibition of sketches and drawings in Thessaloniki, he was appointed war painter in the Moravian Division. Of the 240 negatives recorded in 1916–1918 and preserved in the photo archive of the Military Museum, it can be concluded that Glišić was an extremely productive and valued war reporter. He recorded many episodes from the war, mostly motifs in the background: refugees, military life, hospitals and wounded, staffs and commands, rest of warriors, prisoners ..., some scenes from the immediate war environment that are not uncommon: drawing cannons, columns on the way to positions, trenches with warriors in action, dead guards. Although small, the photographic material with a significant painting and drawing cycle of that author, with motifs of similar content, represents one of the most valuable visual documents about the Serbian army in the First World War.

== Artistic commitment and presentation of the work ==
In addition to motifs from the war, which he exploited for more than a decade, he painted landscape, still life and portraits. He opted for realism, but sometimes he also opted for impressionism. He exhibited independently in Belgrade in 1904 and 1908 and in Šabac in 1906. He was a member of Lada since its inception. At the international exhibition in London in 1907, he experienced great success. After his death, two exhibitions of his works were organized: a retrospective, in Belgrade, in 1957, and an exhibition of paintings and photographs of works created during the war of 1914–1918, in the Military Museum in Belgrade in 1983. The artist's legacy is kept in the Military Museum and, in part, with his heirs.

He tried his hand at icon painting on the eve of the Second World War (1939). He made throne icons for the new Orthodox Church in Belgrade Cottage of Louis Franchet d'Espèrey. It was in the church dedicated to St. Archangel Gabriel, the endowment of Radmila and Milan Vukićević, a former Member of Parliament and retired member of the Main Control Board.
