= Dragomirov =

Dragomirov (masculine, Russian: Драгомиров) or Dragomirova (feminine, Russian: Драгомирова) is a Russian surname. Notable people with the surname include:

- Abram Dragomirov (1868–1955), Russian general, son of Mikhail and brother of Vladimir
- Mikhail Dragomirov (1830–1905), Russian general, father of Abram and Vladimir
- Sonya Dragomirova (born 1961), Bulgarian basketball player
- Vladimir Dragomirov (1867–1928), Russian general, son of Mikhail and brother of Abram

== Fictional ==
- Natalia Dragomiroff, princess and character in Murder on the Orient Express
