= Dragomir Zagorsky =

Bulgarian author and philatelist

Dragomir Zagorsky was a Bulgarian author and philatelist, described by Ivan Metchev as the "greatest expert and collector of Bulgaria of all time".

He wrote widely on the postage stamps and postal history of Bulgaria and Eastern Roumelia. His book, The Jews of Bulgaria: A Collection of Bulgarian Judaica Jüdische (c. 1989), described, through the correspondence of Jewish merchants, the development of postal communications in Bulgaria between independence in 1878 and the Second World War.

== Selected publications ==
- Ostrumelien 1878 - 1885 Postgeschichte und postalische Ausgaben (1984)
- Bulgarien : Postgeschichte und postalische Ausgaben einschliesslich einer detaillierten Studie der Poststempel 1878 - 1935 (1986)
- First Bulgarian Single-Circle Stamps in Historical Rumelia Following Unification, Dragomir Zagorsky, La Mesa CA, 1987.
- A History of Bulgarian Philatelic Rarities, Dragomir Zagorsky, La Mesa CA, 1989.
- "First Issue of Bulgaria", Trumpter, No. 18 (Winter 1989), pp. 1–2.
- The Jews of Bulgaria: A Collection of Bulgarian Judaica Jüdische (c. 1989)
- "Bulgarian forgery found", Linn's Stamp News, 29 March 1993, p. 10.

Bulgarian Language Philatelic Books: • “Златен век на българската марка”, Калифорния (1982), 108 pages • “Цар Фердинанд и фамилията му - пощенски карти”, Калифорния (1982), 128 pages • “България през първите 40 години” - пощенски карти, Калифорния (1982), 255 pages • “Българи и евреи за развоя на България - пощенски карти”, Калифорния (1982), 212 pages • “История на пощите в България”, Калифорния (1983), 426 pages • “Първи български еднокръrови печати след Съединението”, Калифорния (1986), 107 pages • “История на пощите в Източна Румелия”, Калифорния (1983), 80 pages. Второ издание допълнено с еднокръгови печати, Калифорния (1999), 187 pages • “История за българските филателни рядкости”, Трето допълнено издание, Калифорния (1999), 142 pages • “Война срещу фалшивите български марки”, Калифорния (1991), 65 pages • “Кратка история за българските спортни марки”, Калифорния (1995), 66 pages • “История за въздушната поща в България 1926/44”, Калифорния (1995), 140 pages
