= Mitocu Dragomirnei =

- Commune
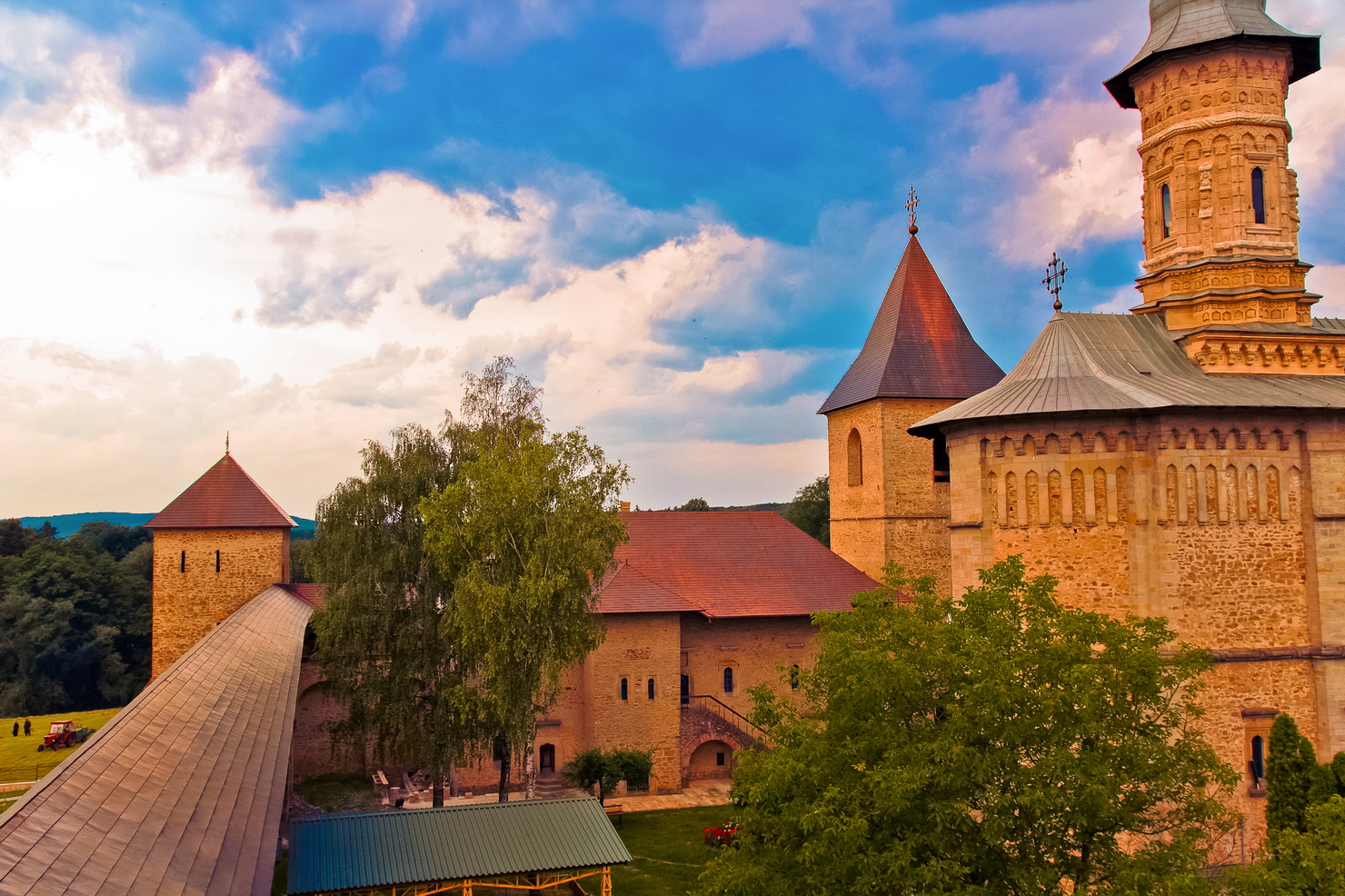
- Dragomirna Monastery

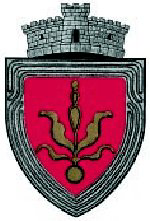
- Coat of arms

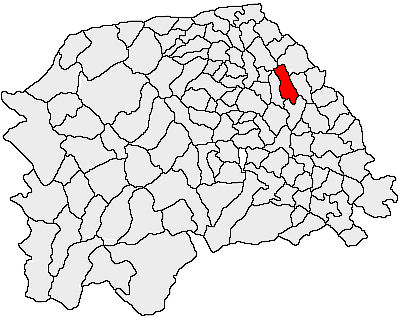
- Location in Suceava County

- Location in Romania
- Coordinates: 47°44′N 26°15′E
- Country: Romania
- County: Suceava

Government
  - Mayor (2020–2024): Radu-Constantin Reziuc (PMP)
- Area: 52.85 km^{2} (20.41 sq mi)
- Elevation: 381 m (1,250 ft)
- Population (2021-12-01): 5,230
  - Density: 99.0/km^{2} (256/sq mi)
- Time zone: UTC+02:00 (EET)
  - Summer (DST): UTC+03:00 (EEST)
- Postal code: 727365
- Area code: +40 230
- Vehicle reg.: SV
- Website: mitocudragomirnei.ro

Mitocu Dragomirnei (Hungarian: Mitók, German: Mitoka Dragomirna) is a commune located in Suceava County, northeastern Romania.

It is composed of four villages: Dragomirna (German: Dragomirestie), Lipoveni (formerly Socolinți; German: Lipoweny), Mitocași (formerly Mitocul Adâncatei), and Mitocu Dragomirnei. Three of these lie in the historical region of Bukovina, while Mitocași is in Western Moldavia. The Dragomirna Monastery is situated in this commune.

In the past, the commune was inhabited by a sizeable German minority, more specifically by Bukovina Germans, from the late 18th century up until the beginning of World War II. The Roman Catholic church they built still stands to this day.

== Administration and local politics ==
=== Communal council ===
The commune's current local council has the following political composition, according to the results of the 2020 Romanian local elections:

| Party | Seats | Current Council |
|---|---|---|
| People's Movement Party (PMP) | 5 | |
| National Liberal Party (PNL) | 4 | |
| Social Democratic Party (PSD) | 4 | |
| Community of the Lipovan Russians in Romania (CRL) | 1 | |
| Independent (Țibu Dumitru) | 1 | |

== Demographics ==
Historical population
| Year | Pop. | ±% |
|---|---|---|
| 1930 | 2,761 | — |
| 2002 | 3,998 | +44.8% |
| 2011 | 4,438 | +11.0% |
| 2021 | 5,230 | +17.8% |
Source: Census data

At the 2021 census, the commune had a population of 5,230, of which 70.38% were Romanians, 15.15% Roma, and 3.35% Lipovans.

== Natives ==
- Silvestru Morariu-Andrievici (1818–1895), Romanian Orthodox cleric

== Gallery ==
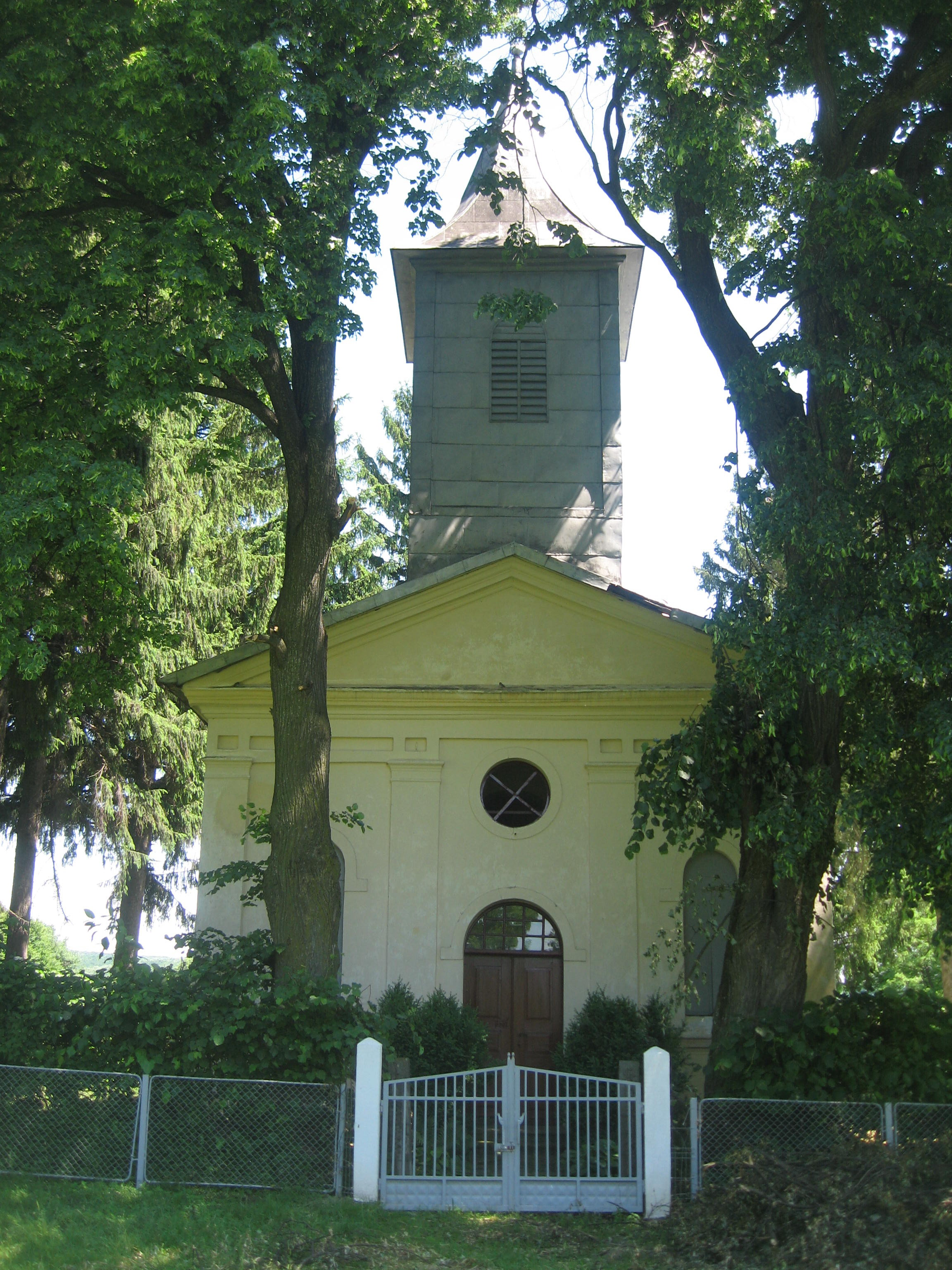
Roman Catholic church formerly used by local Bukovina Germans

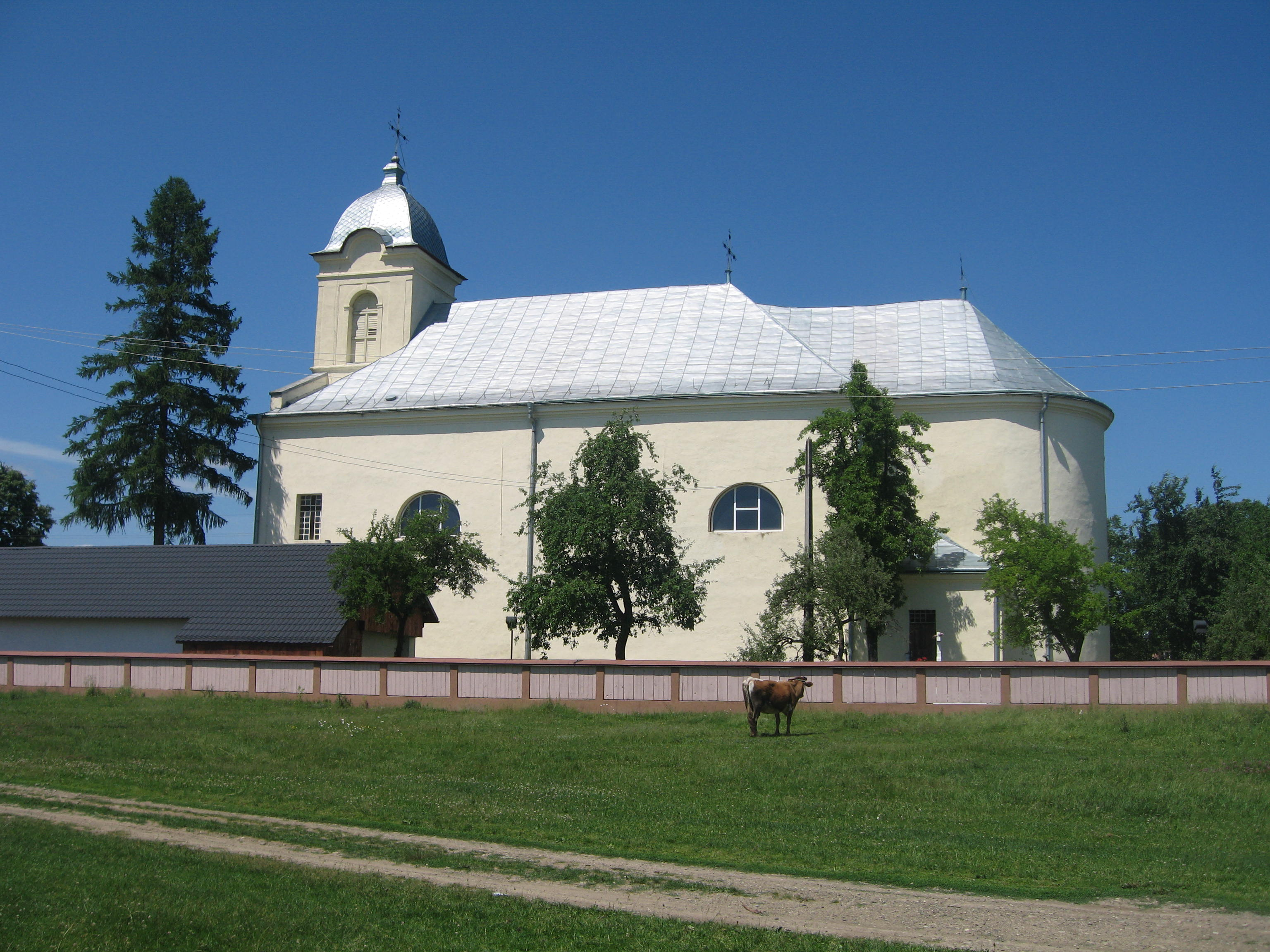
Dormition Orthodox church in Mitocu Dragomirnei
