= Dragomir Draganov (historian) =

Bulgarian historian (1948–2019)

Dragomir Draganov (29 October 1948 – 30 December 2019) was a Bulgarian historian, politician and professor at Sofia University.

== Biography ==
Draganov was born on 29 October 1948 in Pleven. In 1972 he graduated from history at the Faculty of History at Sofia University. Since 1974 he has been an assistant professor, in 1984 he was elected associate professor, and since 1996 he has been a professor in the Department of New and Contemporary History of the Faculty of History of Sofia University. From 1980 to 1983 he was a lecturer in Slavic history at the Autonomous University of Madrid, Spain.

Draganov He was elected MP in the 7th Grand National Assembly and the 38th National Assembly by the Euro-Left. In 2007, he was a candidate for mayor of Sofia, raised by the LIDER Party. He was also co-founder and active player of the Atlantic Club.

== Death ==
Draganov died while on holidays on December 30, 2019 in Sofia.
