= Dragomir Draganov (footballer) =

Bulgarian footballer

Personal information
- Full name: Dragomir Gueorguiev Draganov
- Date of birth: 27 September 1981 (age 45)
- Place of birth: Nova Zagora, Bulgaria
- Height: 1.89 m (6 ft 2 1/2 in)
- Position: Centre forward

Youth career
- Zagorets

Senior career*
| Years | Team | Apps | (Gls) |
| 2002–2003 | Senglea Athletic | | |
| 2003 | Balzan Youths | | |
| 2004 | Kerċem Ajax | | |
| 2004 | Marsaxlokk | 8 | (1) |
| 2005 | Żebbuġ Rovers | | |
| 2005–2006 | Västerås | 35 | (17) |
| 2007 | Enköping | 14 | (1) |
| 2008–2010 | Valsta Syrianska | 57 | (26) |
| 2010 | Syrianska Kerburan | 12 | (2) |
| 2011 | Floriana | 15 | (5) |
| 2011 | Flamurtari | 2 | (0) |
| 2012–2014 | Frej | 31 | (6) |
| 2015 2016–2017 = lärare | Vasalund | 0 | (0) |
- * Club domestic league appearances and goals

Dragomir Draganov (born 27 September 1981) is a Bulgarian footballer.
