= Dragoș (name) =

- Pronunciation: Romanian: [dra.ɡoʃ]
- Gender: Male
- Language: Romanian

Origin
- Origin: Slavic
- Region of origin: Romania, Moldavia

Other names
- Variant form: Drago
- Derived: drag (precious)
- Related names: Dragan, Dragomir, Dragoljub, Dragutin

Dragoș (Romanian: [dra.ɡoʃ]) is a Romanian given name of Slavic origin. It can also appear as a surname.

It is derived from the Slavic word root -drag, meaning "dear, beloved".

== Notable people with the name ==
=== Given name ===
- Dragoș (died c. 1353), Moldavian ruler
- Vlad Dragoș Aicoboae (born 1993), Romanian rower
- Dragoş Balauru (born 1989), Romanian footballer
- Dragoș Agache (born 1984), Romanian swimmer
- Dragoș Albu (born 2001), Romanian footballer
- Dragoș Benea (born 1975), Romanian politician
- Dragoș Bucurenci (born 1981), Romanian communication strategist
- Dragoș Bucur (born 1977), Romanian actor
- Dragoș Cereș (born 2004), Moldovan chess player
- Dragoș Coman (born 1980), Romanian swimmer
- Dragoș Dima (born 1992), Romanian tennis player
- Nicolae Dragoș Dima (born 1979), Romanian rugby union player
- Dragos Dolanescu Valenciano (born 1975), Romanian-Costa Rican psychologist and politician
- Dragoș-Nicolae Dumitrache (born 1964), Romanian chess player
- Dragoș Petre Dumitriu (1964–2021), Romanian politician and journalist
- Dragoș Firțulescu (born 1989), Romanian footballer
- Dragoș Gheorghe (born 1999), Romanian footballer
- Dragoș Grigore (born 1986), Romanian footballer
- Dragoș Huiban (born 1990), Romanian footballer
- Dragoș Iancu (born 2002), Romanian footballer
- Dragoș Iliescu (born 1974), Romanian psychologist and academic
- Adrian Dragoș Iordache (born 1981), Romanian footballer
- Dragoș Nicolae Mădăraș (born 1997), Romanian-Swedish tennis player
- Dragoș Mihalache (born 1975), Romanian footballer
- Dragoș Mihalcea (born 1977), Romanian dancer
- Aurel Dragoș Munteanu (1942–2005), Romanian author
- Dragoș Neagu (born 1967), Romanian rower
- Dragoș Nedelcu (born 1997), Romanian footballer
- Dragoș Penescu (born 2000), Romanian footballer
- Dragoș Plopeanu (born 1988), Romanian football player and coach
- Dragoș Protopopescu (1892–1948), Romanian writer, poet, and philosopher
- Dragoș Pîslaru (born 1976), Romanian economist and politician
- Dragoș Ser (born 1999), Romanian rugby union player
- Andrei Dragoș Șerban (born 2000), Romanian footballer
- Dragoș Staicu (born 1985), Romanian alpine skier
- Dragoș Stoenescu (born 1979), Romanian water polo player
- Dragoș Tescan (born 1999), Romanian footballer
- Dragoș Tudorache (born 1975), Romanian politician

=== Surname ===
- Adrian Dragoș (born 2008), Romanian footballer
- Moise Dragoș (1726–1787), Romanian Greek Catholic hierarch
- Vladimir Dragoș (born 1943), Moldovan operatic baritone

== See also ==
- Drahos
- Dragoš (disambiguation)
- Slavic influence on Romanian
