= Drago (given name) =

- Pronunciation: Serbo-Croatian: [drâːɡo]
- Gender: Male
- Language: Serbo-Croatian, Bulgarian, Macedonian

Origin
- Origin: Slavic
- Region of origin: Southeastern Europe

Other names
- Alternative spelling: Cyrillic: Драго
- Related names: Dragan, Dragutin; female form Draga
- See also: Dragoslav, Dragomir, Dragoljub, Dragoș

Drago (Cyrillic: Драго) is a South Slavic masculine given name. It is derived from the common Slavic element drag meaning "dear, beloved".

It can be used as a shortened form for other names derived from drag like Dragan, Dragutin, etc. The feminine version is Draga. A Romanian version is Dragoș.

== Notable people with the name ==
- Drago Bregar (1952–1977), Slovenian mountaineer
- Drago Marin Čerina (born 1949), Croatian sculpting artist
- Drago Došen (1943–2019), Serbian painter
- Drago Dumbović (born 1960), Croatian football player
- Drago Gabrić (born 1986), Croatian football player
- Drago Gervais (1904–1957), Croatian Istrian poet and playwright
- Drago Grdenić (1919–2018), Croatian chemist
- Drago Grubelnik (1976–2015), Slovenian alpine skier
- Drago Hedl (born 1950), Croatian journalist
- Drago Hmelina (1932–2004), Croatian football player
- Drago Horvat (born 1958), Slovenian ice hockey player
- Drago Husjak (1926–1987), Croatian rower
- Drago Ibler (1894–1964), Croatian architect
- Drago Jančar (born 1948), Slovenian writer
- Drago Jelić (1914–1990), Croatian gymnast
- Drago Jovanović (1916–1983), Serbian-American helicopter designer and inventor
- Drago Jovović (1954–2002), Serbian handball player
- Drago Jurak (1911–1994), Croatian painter
- Drago Karalić (born 1965), Bosnian Serb basketball coach
- Drago Kolar (1932–2000), Slovenian ceramics artist
- Drago Kovačević (1953–2019), Croatian Serb politician and writer
- Drago Lovrić (born 1961), Croatian general
- Drago Mamić (born 1954), Serbian-born Croatian football player and manager
- Drago Marušič (1884–1964), Slovenian and Yugoslav politician and jurist
- Drago Matanović, Slovenian electrical engineer
- Drago Matulaj (1911–1996), Croatian rower
- Drago Miličić, perpetrator of a 1992 mass shooting in Bosnia and Herzegovina
- Drago Milović (born 1994), Montenegrin football player
- Drago Mlinarec (ice hockey) (born 1960), Slovenian international hockey player
- Drago Mlinarec (musician) (born 1942), Croatian pop/rock scriptwriter and composer
- Drago Nikolić (1957–2015), Bosnian Serb war criminal
- Drago Papa (born 1984), Croatian football player
- Drago Pašalić (born 1984), Croatian basketball player
- Drago Pilsel (born 1962), Argentine Croatian journalist
- Drago Prgomet (born 1965), Croatian physician and politician
- Drago Pudgar (born 1949), Slovenian ski jumper
- Drago Savić (born 1949), Slovenian ice hockey player
- Drago Siliqi (1930–1963), Albanian poet, literary critic and publisher
- Drago Supančič (1903–1964), Slovene special-needs teacher
- Drago Šoštarić (born 1943), Slovenian gymnast
- Drago Štajnberger (1916–1942), Croatian Jewish war hero
- Drago Štambuk (born 1950), Croatian physician, writer and diplomat
- Drago Štritof (1923–2014), Croatian runner
- Drago Vabec (born 1950), Croatian football player
- Drago Vuković (born 1983), Croatian handball player
- Drago Žigman (1924–1983), Croatian football player
- Drago Žiljak (born 1960), Croatian handball player and coach

== See also ==
- Drago (disambiguation)
- Drago (surname)
- Dragović (surname)
