= Dragoș (disambiguation) =

Dragoș Vodă is a 14th-century ruler of Moldavia.

Dragoș may also refer to:

- Dragoș (name), list of people named Dragoș
- House of Dragoș, Moldavian noble family
- Dragoș Vodă, Călărași, Romanian commune
- Dragoș River, in Romania

== See also ==
- Dragoš (disambiguation)
- Drahos
