= Supraviețuitorul =

- Genre: Reality television
- Created by: Charlie Parsons
- Presented by: Dragoș Bucurenci
- Country of origin: Romania
- Original language: Romanian
- No. of series: 1
- No. of episodes: 25

Production
- Executive producer: Emilia Vlad
- Production locations: Caramoan, Philippines
- Camera setup: Multiple-camera setup
- Running time: 100 minutes
- Production companies: Pro TV; Zucchero Media

Original release
- Network: PRO TV
- Release: September 12 – November 22, 2016

Related
- Survivor; Expedition Robinson

Supraviețuitorul (lit. '"The survivor"') is the Romanian version of the Survivor reality competition franchise, itself derived from the Swedish television series Expedition Robinson, created by Charlie Parsons, which premiered in 1997. The series was announced on 23 December 2015, and aired on Pro TV from 12 September to 22 November 2016.

The show marooned a group of strangers in an isolated location, where they must provide food, water, fire, and shelter for themselves. The contestants competed in challenges for rewards and immunity from elimination. The contestants were progressively eliminated from the game, as they were voted out by their fellow contestants, until only one remained and was given the title of "Sole Survivor", and was awarded the grand prize of €100,000.

== Format and rules ==
The show follows the same general format as the other editions of the show. The players are split between two "tribes", are taken to a remote isolated location and are forced to live off the land with meager supplies for an extended period of time. Frequent physical and mental challenges are used to pit the teams against each other for rewards, such as food or luxuries, or for "immunity", forcing the other tribe to attend "Tribal Council", where they must vote off one of their players.

Once about half the players are remaining, the tribes are merged into a single tribe, and competitions are on an individual basis; winning immunity prevents that player from being voted out. Most players that are voted out at this stage form the "Tribal Council Jury". Once down to two people, a final Tribal Council is held where the remaining players plead their case to the Jury as to why they should win the game. The jury then votes for which player should be considered the "Sole Survivor" and be awarded the grand prize.

== Series overview ==
List of Survivor (Romania) seasons
No.	Name	Location	Days	Original tribes	Winner	Runners-up		Final vote
1	Supraviețuitorul: Filipine	Caramoan, Camarines Sur, Philippines	44	Hangin, Tubig, Exile	Lucian "Zapp" Lupu	Iulian Pîtea	Otniela Sandu	4–2–1

== Series ratings ==
Official ratings are taken from ARMA (Asociația Română pentru Măsurarea Audiențelor), the organisation that compiles audience measurement and television ratings in Romania.

Season	Timeslot (EEST)^{3}	Premiered		Ended			Episodes	TV season	Rank	Viewers (in millions)
Season	Timeslot (EEST)^{3}	Date	Premiere viewers (in millions)	Date	Finale viewers (in millions)	Reunion viewers (in millions)	Episodes	TV season	Rank	Viewers (in millions)
Supraviețuitorul: Filipine	Monday 8:30 pm Tuesday 8:00 pm	September 12, 2016	1.29	2016	1.2		25	2016		

== See also ==
- Expedition Robinson
- Survivor UK
- Survivor BG
- Survivor Philippines
- Australian Survivor
- Survivor South Africa
- Survivor Srbija
- Sunt celebru, scoate-mă de aici!
