= Supraviețuitorul: Filipine =

- Presented by: Dragoș Bucurenci
- No. of days: 44
- No. of castaways: 18
- Winner: Lucian "Zapp" Lupu
- Runner-up: Iulian Pîtea
- No. of episodes: 25

Release
- Original network: Pro TV
- Original release: 12 September – 22 November 2016

Additional information
- Filming dates: June 2016 – July 2016 and 22 November 2016

Supraviețuitorul: Filipine (lit. '"The survivor: Philippines"') was the first season of Supraviețuitorul, a Romanian television series based on the popular reality game show Survivor. This season was announced by Pro TV on 23 December 2015 and was filmed in Caramoan, Camarines Sur, Philippines from June to July 2016. It aired from 12 September to 22 November 2016 on Pro TV. Hosted by Romanian journalist Dragoș Bucurenci, the program featured 18 Romanian castaways competing for 44 days. The grand prize, won by Lucian "Zapp" Lupu, consisted of €100,000.

The 18 castaways were divided into two tribes of nine, each named after a beach in the Philippines: Hangin and Tubig.

== Contestants ==
There were eighteen contestants overall, sixteen of them divided into two tribes, Hangin and Tubig.

The tribes were switched when thirteen players were left in the game. After eight contestants were eliminated, the tribes were combined, or merged, to form one tribe: Araw.

After he returned in the game, winning the last duel of Exile Island, Lucian became the Sole Survivor.

List of Supraviețuitorul (season 1) contestants
Contestant	Original tribe	Switched tribe	Merged tribe	Status	Exile Island	Finish	Total votes
Aurelia Ardelean; 37, Zalău				Eliminated; Day 1	Lost 1st duel Day 6	18th	0
Alex Crețu; 27, Constanța	Hangin			Voted out Day 5	Lost 2nd duel Day 10	17th	4
Alexandra "Șniți" Matei; 25, Ploiești	Tubig	Tubig		3rd voted out Day 12	Lost 3rd duel Day 15	16th	4
Alin Munteanu; 35, Bucharest	Tubig	Tubig		4th voted out Day 16	Lost 4th duel Day 19	15th	4
Diana Burnaz; 26, Bucharest	Tubig	Hangin	Araw	Eliminated; Day 21	Lost 5th duel Day 26	14th	0
Maria Munteanu; 24, Bacău	Hangin	Tubig		5th voted out Day 20	Lost 6th duel Day 30	13th	4
Liviu Dolha; 40, Câmpia Turzii				Eliminated; Day 1	Lost 7th duel Day 34	12th	0
Ina Chira; 38, Cluj-Napoca	Hangin			2nd voted out Day 8	Lost 8th duel Day 38	11th	4
Lucian "Zapp" Lupu; 24, Ploiești	Hangin			1st voted out Day 4	Won 8th duel Day 38	Returned	6
Post Exile Island
Raisa Kadar; 28, Timișoara	Hangin	Tubig	Araw	6th voted out 1st Jury member Day 24		10th	1
Mircea "Musashy" Sărac; 38, Sibiu	Tubig	Hangin	Araw	7th voted out 2nd Jury member Day 28		9th	7
Mircea "Daddy" Amza; 48, Arad	Hangin	Tubig	Araw	8th voted out 3rd Jury member Day 32		8th	10
Andreea "Dudu" Costin; 24, Bucharest	Tubig	Hangin	Araw	9th voted out 4th Jury member Day 36		7th	8
Adina Popescu; 28, Bucharest	Tubig	Hangin	Araw	10th voted out 5th Jury member Day 40		6th	7
Robert Paul; 29, Cluj-Napoca	Hangin	Tubig	Araw	Eliminated; 6th/7th Jury member Day 43		4th/5th	4
Andrei Zamfir; 27, Bucharest	Tubig	Hangin	Araw	Eliminated; 6th/7th Jury member Day 43		4th/5th	0
Otniela Sandu; 27, Bucharest	Hangin	Hangin	Araw	2nd runner-up		3rd	8
Iulian Pîtea; 18, Râșnov	Tubig	Hangin	Araw	Runner-up		2nd	2
Lucian "Zapp" Lupu; 24, Ploiești	Hangin		Araw	Sole Survivor	Won 8th duel Day 38	1st	6

== Season summary ==
Challenge winners and eliminations by cycle
Episodes		Exile Island duel		Challenge winner(s)		Eliminated	Finish
No.	Original air dates	Winner(s)	Eliminated	Reward	Immunity	Eliminated	Finish
1 & 2	12 & 13 September 2016	None		-	Lucian	Aurelia	Eliminated; Day 1
1 & 2	12 & 13 September 2016	None		-	Diana	Liviu	Eliminated; Day 1
1 & 2	12 & 13 September 2016	None		Tubig	Tubig	Lucian	1st voted out Day 4
3 & 4	19 & 20 September 2016	Alex	Aurelia	Tubig	-	Alex	Voted out Day 5
3 & 4	19 & 20 September 2016	Lucian	Aurelia	Tubig	-	Alex	Voted out Day 5
3 & 4	19 & 20 September 2016	Liviu	Aurelia	-	Tubig	Ina	2nd voted out Day 8
Tribe Switch
5 & 6	26 & 27 September 2016	Ina	Alex	Hangin	Hangin	Alexandra	3rd voted out Day 12
7 & 8	3 & 4 October 2016	Lucian	Alexandra	Tubig	Hangin	Alin	4th voted out Day 16
9 & 10	10 & 11 October 2016	Lucian	Alin	Tubig	Hangin	Maria	5th voted out Day 20
9 & 10	10 & 11 October 2016	Liviu	Alin	Tubig	Hangin	Maria	5th voted out Day 20
9 & 10	10 & 11 October 2016	Ina	Alin	Tubig	Hangin	Maria	5th voted out Day 20
Merge
11	17 October 2016	None		Mircea (Adina, Andreea)	Mircea	Diana	Eliminated; Day 21
11	17 October 2016	None		Mircea (Adina, Andreea)	Mircea	Raisa	6th voted out 1st Jury Member; Day 24
12 & 13	24 & 25 October 2016	Liviu	Diana	Mircea, Robert, Andrei, Otniela	Andrei	Musashy	7th voted out 2nd Jury Member; Day 28
12 & 13	24 & 25 October 2016	Maria	Diana	Mircea, Robert, Andrei, Otniela	Andrei	Musashy	7th voted out 2nd Jury Member; Day 28
12 & 13	24 & 25 October 2016	Ina	Diana	Mircea, Robert, Andrei, Otniela	Andrei	Musashy	7th voted out 2nd Jury Member; Day 28
12 & 13	24 & 25 October 2016	Lucian	Diana	Mircea, Robert, Andrei, Otniela	Andrei	Musashy	7th voted out 2nd Jury Member; Day 28
14 & 15	31 October & 2 November 2016	Liviu	Maria	Survivor; Auction	Andrei	Mircea	8th voted out 3rd Jury Member; Day 32
16, 17, 18 & 19	7, 8, 9 & 10 November 2016	Ina	Liviu	Adina (Iulian)	Andrei	Andreea	9th voted out 4th Jury Member; Day 36
16, 17, 18 & 19	7, 8, 9 & 10 November 2016	Lucian	Liviu	Adina (Iulian)	Andrei	Andreea	9th voted out 4th Jury Member; Day 36
20, 21, 22 & 23	14, 15, 16 & 17 November 2016	Lucian	Ina	Robert (Andrei)	Andrei	Adina	10th voted out 5th Jury member Day 40
24	21 November 2016	None		Lucian		None	Eliminated; 6th/7th Jury members Day 44
24	21 November 2016	None		Otniela		None	Eliminated; 6th/7th Jury members Day 44
24	21 November 2016	None		Iulian		Robert	Eliminated; 6th/7th Jury members Day 44
24	21 November 2016	None		Iulian		Andrei	Eliminated; 6th/7th Jury members Day 44
25	22 November 2016	None		None		Jury vote	
25	22 November 2016	None		None		Otniela	2nd runner-up
25	22 November 2016	None		None		Iulian	Runner-up
25	22 November 2016	None		None		Lucian	Sole Survivor

=== Episodes ===
No. overall	No. in season	Title	Original release date
1	1	"Episode 1"	12 September 2016
Individual immunity challenge: The newly marooned castaways must jump off their platform, swim across the sea and reach the drop-off beach where two individual immunity necklaces, one for each gender, are waiting. In addition, the last male and female were eliminated from the game.; Reward challenge A designated swimmer would swim out into the ocean to retrieve a key and swim back. The swimmer would hand the key to the designated strong person to unlock a chain around two bundles of heavy logs. The logs would have to be carried to the next station where a designated agile person would use the log bundles to climb on top of a balance beam. The agile person would need to pull a second key along a rope twisted around the balance beam while remaining on top of the balance beam. At the final stage, a designated smart person would use the second key to unlock a bag of puzzle pieces and use them to assemble a statue.
2	2	"Episode 2"	13 September 2016

=== Voting history ===
Color key

Hangin tribe
Tubig tribe
Araw tribe
Exile Island

	No tribes		Original tribes			Switched tribes				Merged tribe												
Episode No.	1		2	3	4	6	8		10	11		13		15	17					19	24	
Day No.	1		4	5	8	12	16		20	21	24	28		32	36					40	43	
Voted out	Aurelia	Liviu	Lucian	Alex (Note: Alex wasn't eliminated at an official Tribal Council. Instead, an open vote was held on the beach after the Reward Challenge.)	Ina	Alexandra	Alin		Maria	Diana	Raisa	Musashy		Mircea	Andreea					Adina	Robert	Andrei
Votes	None (Note: For losing the initial challenge, Aurelia and Liviu were not assigned tribes and immediately sent to Exile Island.)		6–2	4–3	4–2	4–1–1	Tie (Note: The Tribal Council Vote resulted in a tie. Per the rules, a second vote was held where the castaways involved in the tie would not vote and the remaining castaways could only vote for those who tied.)	2–1	3–1	None (Note: For losing the first challenge after the merge, Diana was immediately sent to Exile Island.)	1–0 (Note: At Tribal Council, the contestants had to vote for one person who will choose the contestant that will be eliminated. Musashy won (3 votes) against Andrei (2 votes), Andreea (2 votes) and Adina (2 votes).)	7–3 (Note: At Tribal Council, the contestants had two options: they could either name a traitor of the tribe and get food, or they could name two traitors and get a double vote and no food. Everyone chose the food, except Mircea and Robert who obtained the power to cast two votes.)		4–2–1	5–5–2–1–1 (Note: The day before the Tribal Council, the contestants were tempted with three menus of food. For every menu of food they've chosen, they had to cast a vote against themselves at Tribal Council. If a contestant chose no menu, they had the power to cast two votes for whoever they want. Adina got three votes against her, Andreea and Iulian got two votes against each one respectively and Otniela and Robert obtained the power to cast two votes. Since Andrei won Immunity, if he gave up the power to cast a vote, the tribe would get extra food, which he did.)				3–0	4–1	None (Note: The finalists were chosen at three challenges. Lucian won the first challenge, Otniela won the second challenge and Iulian won the third and last challenge, resulting in Andrei and Robert's elimination.)	
Voter	Vote																					
Lucian			Otniela																			
Iulian												Mircea		Mircea	Iulian	Iulian	Andreea		Andreea	Adina		
Otniela			Lucian	Alex	Ina							Musashy		Mircea	Andreea		Andreea		Andreea	Adina		
Andrei												Mircea		Mircea	None					Adina		
Robert			Lucian	Alex	Ina	Mircea	Maria	Alin	Maria			Musashy	Musashy	Adina	Adina		Adina		Andreea	Adina		
Adina												Musashy		Robert	Adina	Adina	Adina	Robert	None (Note: Adina and Andreea were not eligible to vote in the second round of voting.)	Robert		
Andreea												Musashy		Mircea	Andreea	Andreea	Otniela		None			
Mircea			Lucian	Otniela	Otniela	Alexandra	Alin	None (Note: Alin and Mircea were not eligible to vote in the second round of voting.)	Maria			Musashy	Musashy	Adina								
Musashy											Raisa	Mircea										
Raisa			Lucian	Alex	Ina	Alexandra	Mircea	Mircea	Maria													
Diana																						
Maria			Otniela	Alex	Ina	Alexandra	Alin	Alin	Robert													
Alin						Alexandra	Mircea	None														
Alexandra						Robert																
Ina			Lucian	Otniela	Otniela																	
Alex			Lucian	Otniela																		
Liviu																						
Aurelia																						

Jury vote
Episode No.	25		
Day No.	44		
Finalist	Iulian	Otniela	Lucian
Votes	2-1-4		
Juror	Vote		
Andrei		Otniela	
Robert	Iulian		
Adina			Lucian
Andreea			Lucian
Mircea			Lucian
Musashy	Iulian		
Raisa			Lucian

== Ratings ==
No.	Original airdate	Timeslot (EEST)	National				Urban				18–49			Source
No.	Original airdate	Timeslot (EEST)	Rank	Viewers (in millions)	Rating (%)	Share (%)	Rank	Viewers (in millions)	Rating (%)	Share (%)	Rank	Viewers (in millions)	Rating (%)	Source
1	September 12, 2016	Monday 8:30 p.m.	1	1.29	7.2	16.5	1	0.76	7.8	17.3	1	0.38	8.7	
2	September 13, 2016	Tuesday 8:00 p.m.	1	1.12	6.3	15.1	1	0.59	6.1	14.4	1	0.32	7.3	
3	September 19, 2016	Monday 8:30 p.m.	2	1.14	6.4	13.8	2	0.64	6.6	13.8	2	0.38	8.7	
4	September 20, 2016	Tuesday 8:30 p.m.	2	1.14	6.4	13.1	2	0.6	6.2	12.8	2	0.34	7.8	
