= 2024–25 Moldovan Women's Basketball League =

Women's basketball league in Moldova

Moldovan Women's Basketball League
- Season: 2024–25
- Dates: Regular season: 5 October 2024 – 22 March 2025; Play Offs and Classification Round: 30 March – 15 June 2025

Regular season
- Season MVP: (Moldova) Irina Nebesnaia

Finals
- Champions: CS Asem (5th title)
- Runners-up: SS Balti
- Finals MVP: (Moldova) Ksenia Alfiorova

Statistical leaders
Points	(Moldova) Ecaterina Tcacenco	22.8
Rebounds	(Moldova) Irina Nebesnaia	16.5
Assists	(Moldova) Olga Tugui	5.6
Steals	(Moldova) Ecaterina Tcacenco	4.0
Blocks	(Moldova) Valeria Lisii	1.5

The 2024–25 Moldovan Women's Basketball League is the top division women's basketball league in Moldova. It starts in October 2024 with the first round of the regular season and ends in May 2025.

SS Balti are the defending champions.

CS Asem won their fifth title after beating SS Balti in the final.

== Format ==
Each team plays each other twice. The top four teams qualify for the play offs where every round is held as a best of three series.

== Regular season ==
Pos	Team	Pld	W	L	PF	PA	PD	Pts	Qualification
1	SS Balti	10	10	0	919	507	+412	20	Play Offs
2	CS Asem	10	8	2	810	548	+262	18	Play Offs
3	Pirania	10	5	5	678	573	+105	15 (Note: Pirania 129–103 CS UTM)	Play Offs
4	CS UTM	10	5	5	704	690	+14	15	Play Offs
5	Basarabeasca	10	2	8	467	667	−200	12	5–6 Classification
6	SS Causeni	10	0	10	372	965	−593	10	5–6 Classification

Source: Moldovan Women's Basketball League
Rules for classification: 1) Points; 2) Points difference; 3) Points scored.

== Play offs ==
=== 5–6 Classification ===
Semifinal play in
Basarabeasca	87	105	192
SS Causeni	34	49	83

=== Main bracket ===
Semifinals	Final
1	SS Balti	83	75	2
4	CS UTM	64	47	0
1	SS Balti	50	47	53	0
2	CS Asem	91	88	72	3
2	CS Asem	77	63	77	2
3	Pirania	56	75	39	1	Third place
4	CS UTM	68	54	40	42	1
3	Pirania	72	47	41	67	3

Champions of Moldova

CS Asem
Fifth title
