= Dragoš (disambiguation) =

Dragoš was a magnate in the service of Serbian King Stefan Milutin

Dragoš (Serbian Cyrillic: Драгош) may also refer to:

- Dragoš Kalajić, Serbian painter, philosopher, art critic, writer and politician
- Dragoš, North Macedonia, village in North Macedonia

== See also ==
- Drahos
- Dragoș (disambiguation)
