= Xenia Deli =

Moldovan-American model

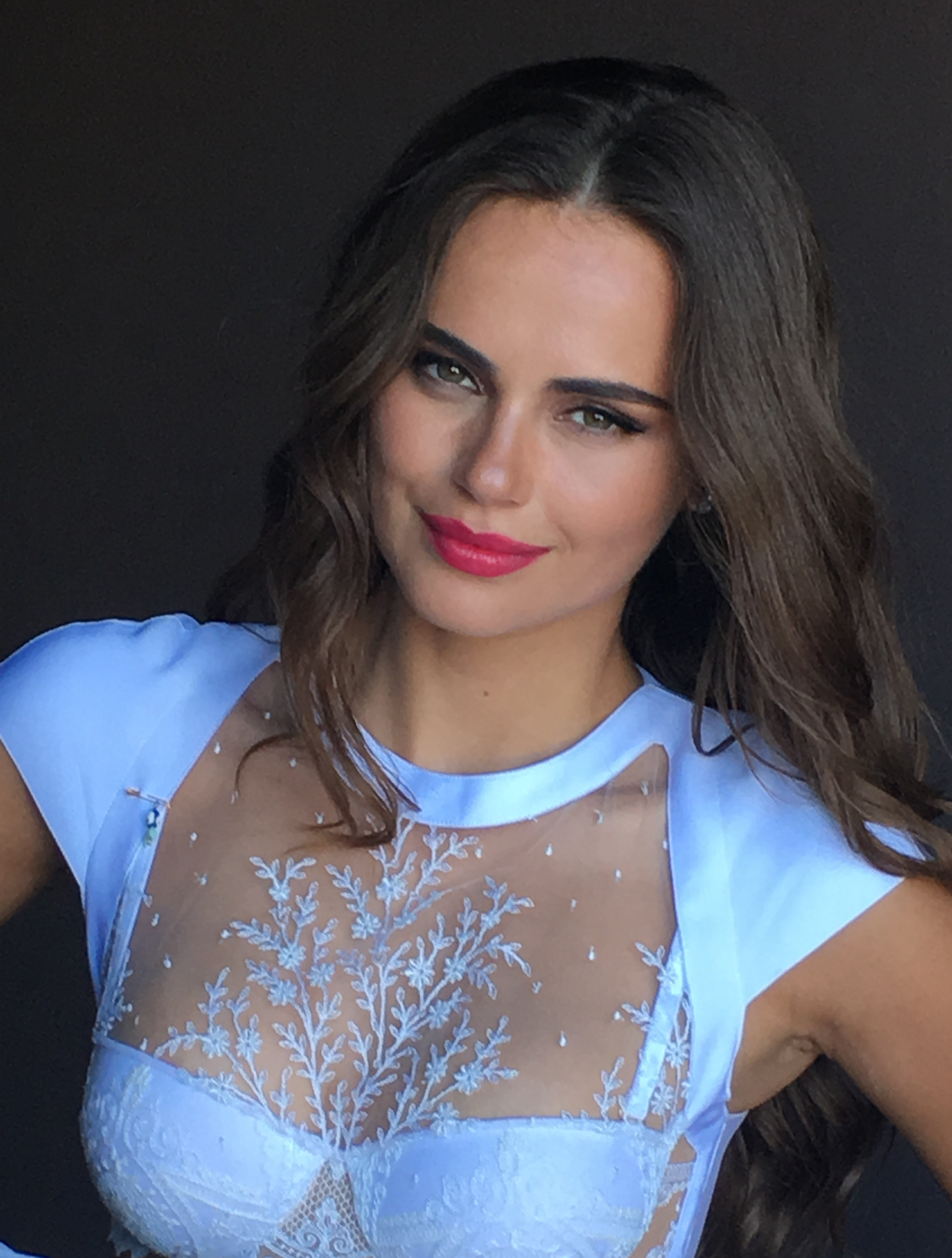
- Deli in 2016
- Born: 27 October 1989 (age 36); Basarabeasca, Moldavian SSR, Soviet Union (now Moldova)
- Occupation: Model
- Years active: 2011–present
- Spouse: Ossama Fathi Rabah Al-Sharif (m. 2016)
- Modeling information
- Height: 1.70 m (5 ft 7 in)
- Hair color: Light Brown
- Eye color: Green
- Agency: Elite Model Management (New York, Los Angeles, Miami)

Xenia Deli (born 27 October 1989) is a Moldovan-American model. She lives in Los Angeles, California. She has been featured on several fashion magazine covers, including Elle, FMD Magazine and Sport Illustrated of South Africa. She also starred in music videos, including "Thinking About You" and Justin Bieber's "What Do You Mean?" in 2015.

== Biography ==
Xenia Deli was born in Basarabeasca, Moldova. She is ethnically Gagauz. She began studying literature and planned on becoming a teacher, but graduated from the first course of the Moldova State University. She also attended modeling school. She went on an exchange program to the United States from Moldova and worked as a waitress. During her time as a waitress she met her first husband, American photographer Patrick Cox, and through their marriage she gained American citizenship It is unclear when the marriage ended. Later, she attended a program for modeling students, Deli competed in a 'Beach Bunny' contest and was one of three finalists. The brand invited her to represent them in their advertising campaign.

Soon after that, Deli met photographer Gavin O'Neill, who invited her to shoot. His submission of her photos to a modeling agency resulted in an interview and a contract. In 2010 she moved to South Carolina. Now she divides her time between New York City and Los Angeles.

On 4 June 2016 Deli married 62-year-old Egyptian (of Palestinian origin) millionaire Ossama Fathi Rabah Al-Sharif, on the island Santorini, in Greece. Her husband has three children of approximately the same age as Deli.

Deli is of Eastern Orthodox Christian faith, while her husband is of Muslim faith. She speaks Russian (native), English, and Romanian.

== Career ==
=== Modeling ===
Deli started her career with photographs taken by Gavin O'Neill, a fashion photographer, who showed his work to an agency. She got a contract as a model. Deli signed to Elite Model Management in Miami in 2011 and New York City in 2014. Deli picked up a modeling contract with Victoria's Secret after its representatives saw a poster with her picture from another campaign at a store across from their offices. They invited her for an interview and the parties reached a contract.

Deli has been featured on numerous magazine covers, such as Playboy, Love FMD Magazine, Elle Romania, and Sport Illustrated of South Africa. She has also been featured in magazines, including FHM, GQ, Sports Illustrated, Vogue, Harper's Bazaar, and Maxim. In 2012 Deli appeared nude in Lovecat Magazine.

=== Music videos ===
Deli has starred in music videos, including Ionel Istrati's "Wake Me Up" and Calvin Harris's "Thinking About You". In 2015 Deli co-starred in Justin Bieber's video "What Do You Mean?," gaining widespread press attention because of the singer's popularity, after the video was released on August 28, 2015.

This was Bieber's first No. 1 hit, according to New York Magazine. After the release of the video, Deli said, Bieber's fans were not happy to see her with their idol. There was widespread speculation about whether she was dating the singing star.

Deli played a minor role in The Mindy Project. She has said that she likes to watch movies and she loves acting. She is taking acting classes, and her future plans include to play in movies.
