= Bijeljina and Modran shootings =

1992 mass shooting in Yugoslavia

- Location: Bijeljina and Modran, Socialist Republic of Bosnia and Herzegovina, Yugoslavia
- Date: 2 February 1992
- Attack type: Mass shooting
- Weapons: Assault rifle, grenades
- Deaths: 6
- Perpetrator: Drago Miličić

The Bijeljina and Modran shootings was a mass shooting event that occurred on 2 February 1992 at Bijeljina and Modran, in then Yugoslavia. Drago Miličić shot and killed six people.

== Shooting ==
In the night of 2 February 1992, Yugoslav People's Army conscript Drago Miličić, 20, got drunk in a cafe in Modran, where he smashed several ashtrays with a knife before returning to his barracks. There, he seized a rifle and shot his commander and two privates as they slept. He then threw grenades at security posts, stole a car, and returned to Modran, where he shot his girlfriend's mother, her father, and her brother. He proceeded to barricade himself in their house before surrendering to police a few hours later.

== Perpetrator ==
Four and a half months before the shooting, Miličić had been drafted into the army. During a medical examination before conscription, the psychiatrist noted that he was emotionally immature, and that he had an anxiety-depression disorder, but that this was not a sufficient reason to prevent his enrollment in the army. Lieutenant Dragoslav Radovanovic, Miličić's superior and subsequent victim, had tried in early October 1991 to inform his superiors that Miličić should be released due to mental issues. His claims were ignored at the time, and Miličić remained in the army.

== See also ==
- List of rampage killers in Europe
