= Drago (surname) =

Drago is a surname typically of Italian origin, meaning "dragon". Historically, Drago can be observed as an Italian Jewish (Italkim) habitational name. It may also be of Mixed heritage, possibly French, Croatian, Albanian and Spanish origin. It is another spelling of the last name "Dragaud" or "Dragoo". Notable people with the surname include:

- Ana Drago (born 1975), Portuguese politician
- Billy Drago (1945–2019), stage name of American actor William Eugene Burrows
- Dick Drago (born 1945), American baseball player
- Filippo Drago (pharmacologist) (born 1954), Italian pharmacologist
- Jaime Drago (born 1959), Peruvian footballer
- Luis María Drago (1859–1921), Argentine politician
- Massimo Drago (born 1971), Italian football player and coach
- Roberto Drago (1923–2014), Peruvian footballer and manager
- Titín Drago (born 1951), Peruvian footballer and manager
- Russell S. Drago (1928–1997), American chemist
- Tony Drago (born 1965), Maltese snooker and pool player

== Fictional persons ==
- Blackie Drago, a Marvel Comics super-villain known as the Vulture
- Ivan Drago, a fictional professional boxer from the Rocky film series

== See also ==
- Drago (given name)
- Gago Drago (born 1985), stage name of Armenian kickboxer Gagik Harutyunyan
- Prince del Drago, 1860–1956, Italian noble and New York socialite
