= Dragutinović =

Dragutinović (Serbian: Драгутиновић) is a Serbian patronymic surname derived from the masculine given name Dragutin. Notable people with the surname include:

- Branko Dragutinović (born 1961), Serbian football player
- Diana Dragutinović (born 1958), Serbian economist and politician
- Dragan Dragutinović (born 1980), Serbian footballer
- Ivica Dragutinović (born 1975), Serbian footballer
- Nikola Dragutinović (born 1991), Serbian actor
- Vladimir Dragutinović (born 1967), Serbian basketball player

== See also ==
- Dragutin
