= Dragutin =

- Pronunciation: Serbo-Croatian: [draɡǔtin]
- Gender: Male
- Language: Serbo-Croatian

Origin
- Origin: South Slavic

Other names
- Alternative spelling: Serbian Cyrillic: Драгутин
- Derived: drag (precious)
- Related names: Drago, Dragan, Dragomir, Dragoljub

Dragutin (Cyrillic: Драгутин) is a Croatian and Serbian masculine given name. It is derived from the common Slavic element drag meaning "dear, beloved".

== Notable people with the name ==
- Stefan Dragutin of Serbia (died 1316), King of Serbia
- Dragutin Aleksić (1947–2011), Serbian sculptor
- Dragutin Anastasijević (1877–1950), Serbian byzantinist and philologist
- Dragutin Babić (1897–1945), Croatian footballer
- Dragutin Brahm (1909–1938), Croatian mountain climber
- Dragutin Čelić (born 1962), Croatian footballer
- Dragutin Čermak (1944–2021), Serbian basketball player and coach
- Dragutin Ciotti (1905–1974), Croatian gymnast
- Dragutin Čolić (1907–1987), Serbian composer, publicist and pedagogue
- Dragutin Dimitrijević (1876–1917), Serbian army officer
- Dragutin Domjanić (1875–1933), Croatian poet
- Dragutin Đorđević (1866–1933), Serbian architect and university professor
- Dragutin Esser, French racing driver
- Dragutin Franasović (1842–1914), Serbian army general and politician
- Dragutin Friedrich (1897–1980), Croatian footballer
- Dragutin Gavrilović (1882–1945), Serbian military officer
- Dragutin Golub (born 1987), Croatian footballer
- Dragutin Gorjanović-Kramberger (1856–1936), Croatian geologist, paleontologist, and archeologist
- Dragutin Gostuški (1923–1998), Serbian composer and musicologist
- Dragutin Haramija (1923–2012), Croatian politician
- Dragutin Horvat (born 1976), German darts player
- Dragutin Hrastović, Croatian singer and composer
- Dragutin Ilić (1858–1926), Serbian playwright, poet, and novelist
- Dragutin Inkiostri Medenjak (1866–1942), Serbian painter
- Dragutin Jovanović-Lune (1892–1932), Serbian guerrilla fighter and politician
- Dragutin Kamber (1901–1969), Croatian Jesuit priest
- Dragutin Keserović (1896–1945), Serbian military commander
- Dragutin Karoly Khuen-Héderváry (1849–1918), Hungarian politician
- Dragutin Kosovac (1924–2012), Bosnian politician
- Dragutin Lerman (1863–1918), Croatian explorer
- Dragutin Lesar (born 1956), Croatian politician
- Dragutin Mate (born 1963), Slovenian diplomat and politician
- Dragutin Matić (1888–1970), Serbian military scout
- Dragutin Mitić (1917–1986), Croatian tennis player
- Dragutin Najdanović (1908–1981), Serbian footballer
- Dragutin Novak (1892–1978), Croatian aviator
- Dragutin Petrovečki (1914–?), Croatian rower
- Dragutin Pećić (1871–1948), Serbian politician and lawyer
- Dragutin Prica (1867–1960), Croatian admiral
- Dragutin Radimir (1889–1983), Yugoslav forestry expert
- Dragutin Rakovac (1813–1854), Croatian writer, translator and journalist
- Dragutin Ristić (born 1964), Croatian footballer
- Dragutin Šahović (1940–2005), Serbian chess player
- Dragutin Spasojević (1934–2016), Montenegrin football player and manager
- Dragutin Stević-Ranković (born 1979), Serbian footballer
- Dragutin Štritof (1923–2014), Croatian middle-distance runner
- Dragutin Šurbek (1946–2018), Croatian table tennis player
- Dragutin Tadijanović (1905–2007), Croatian poet
- Dragutin Tomašević (1890–1915), Serbian athlete and gymnast
- Dragutin Topić (born 1971), Serbian high jumper
- Drago Vabec (born 1950), Croatian footballer
- Dragutin Vragović (1897–1973), Croatian footballer
- Dragutin Vrđuka (1895–1948), Croatian footballer
- Dragutin Wolf (1866–1927), Croatian industrialist
- Dragutin Zelenović (1928–2020), Serbian politician

== See also ==
- Dragutinovo, former village
- Dragutinović, surname
