= Drago Žigman =

Yugoslav footballer

Personal information
- Date of birth: 12 June 1924
- Place of birth: Zagreb, Kingdom of Serbs, Croats and Slovenes
- Date of death: 8 November 1983 (aged 59)
- Place of death: Zagreb, SR Croatia, SFR Yugoslavia
- Position: Forward

Senior career*
Years	Team	Apps	(Gls)
1942–1944	NK Mesarski	63	(22)
1944–1949	Lokomotiva Zagreb	89	(31)
1949–1951	FK Sarajevo	41	(25)

Managerial career
- 1953–1961: Borac Zagreb
- * Club domestic league appearances and goals

Drago Žigman (12 June 1924 – 8 November 1983) was a Croatian and Yugoslav professional footballer.

== Career ==
Žigman played the position of forward for local Zagreb sides NK Mesarski and Lokomotiva Zagreb, as well as for FK Sarajevo. He was the latter's top scorer during the 1950–51 season. After retiring from professional football, Žigman managed Borac Zagreb for a few years.
