= Sorin Iulian Pîtea =

Romanian ski jumper

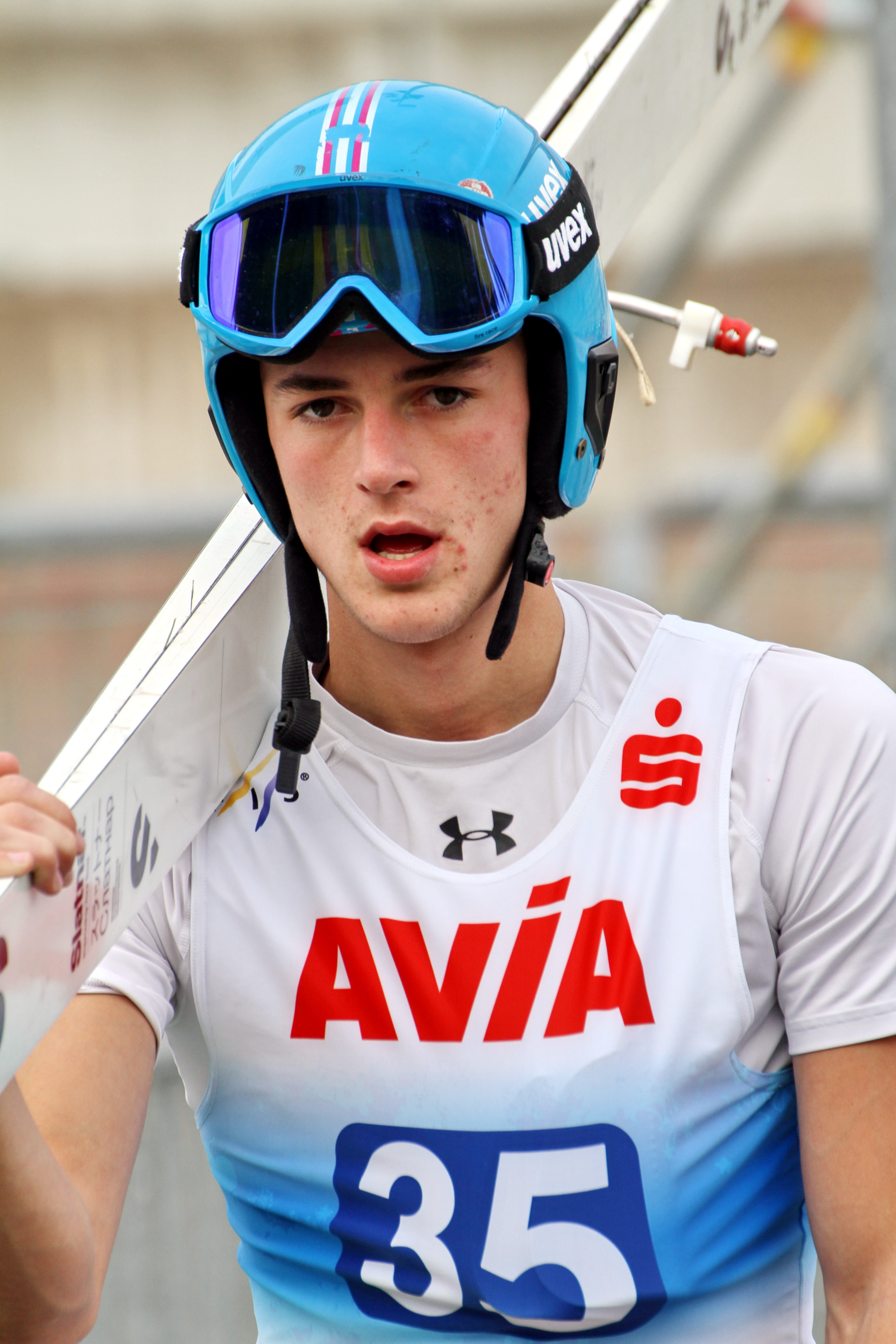
- Pîtea in 2017

Personal information
- Full name: Sorin Iulian Pîtea
- Born: 9 July 1997 (age 28) Brașov, Romania

Sport
- Sport: Skiing
- Club: CSS Dinamo Râșnov

Sorin Iulian Pîtea (born 9 July 1997) is a Romanian ski jumper who competed in the 2013–14 FIS Ski Jumping World Cup. He competed for Romania at the 2014 Winter Olympics in Men's normal hill individual. He came second in the reality survival show Supraviețuitorul: Filipine.
