= Basarabeasca =

- City
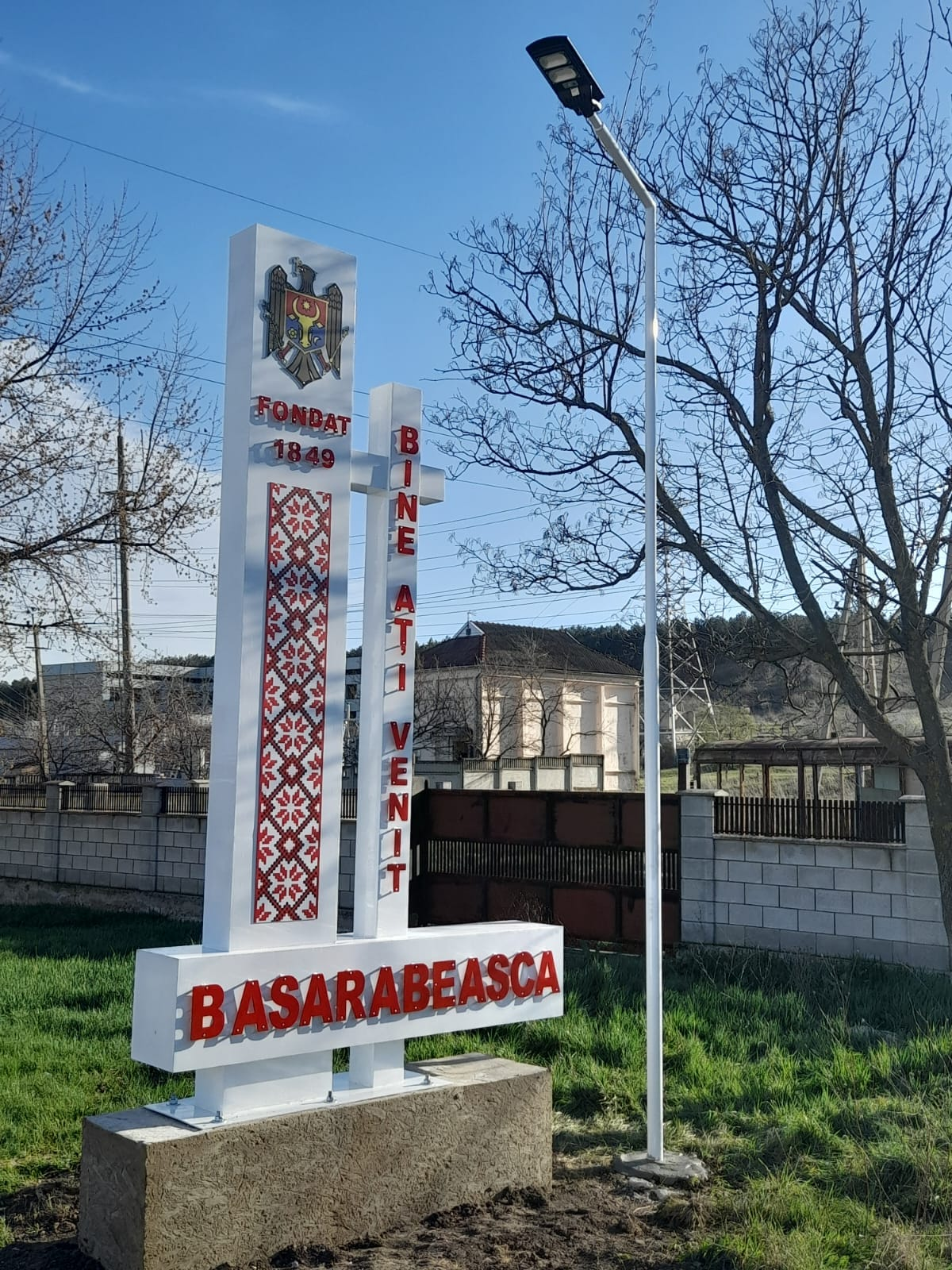
- City entrance monument

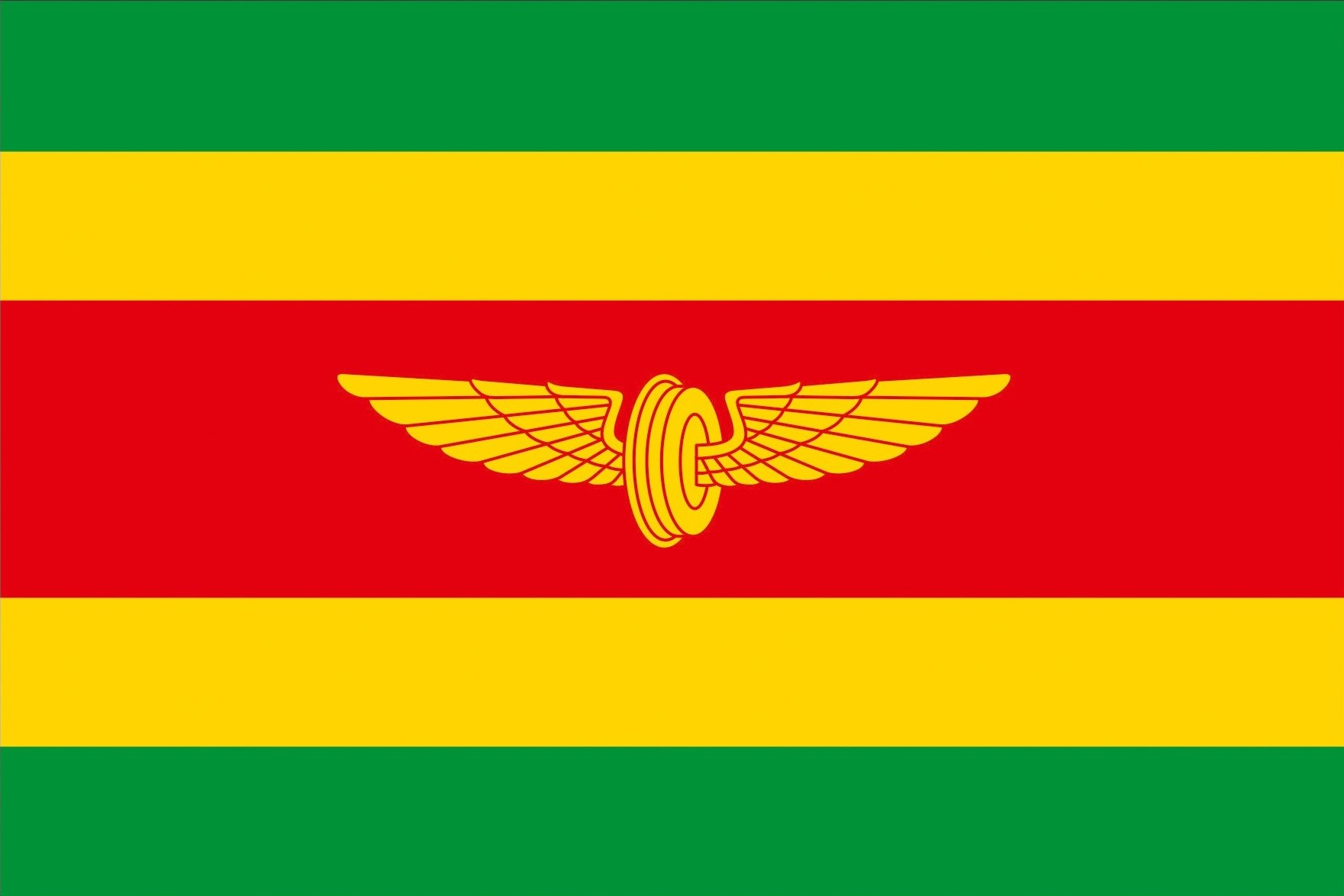
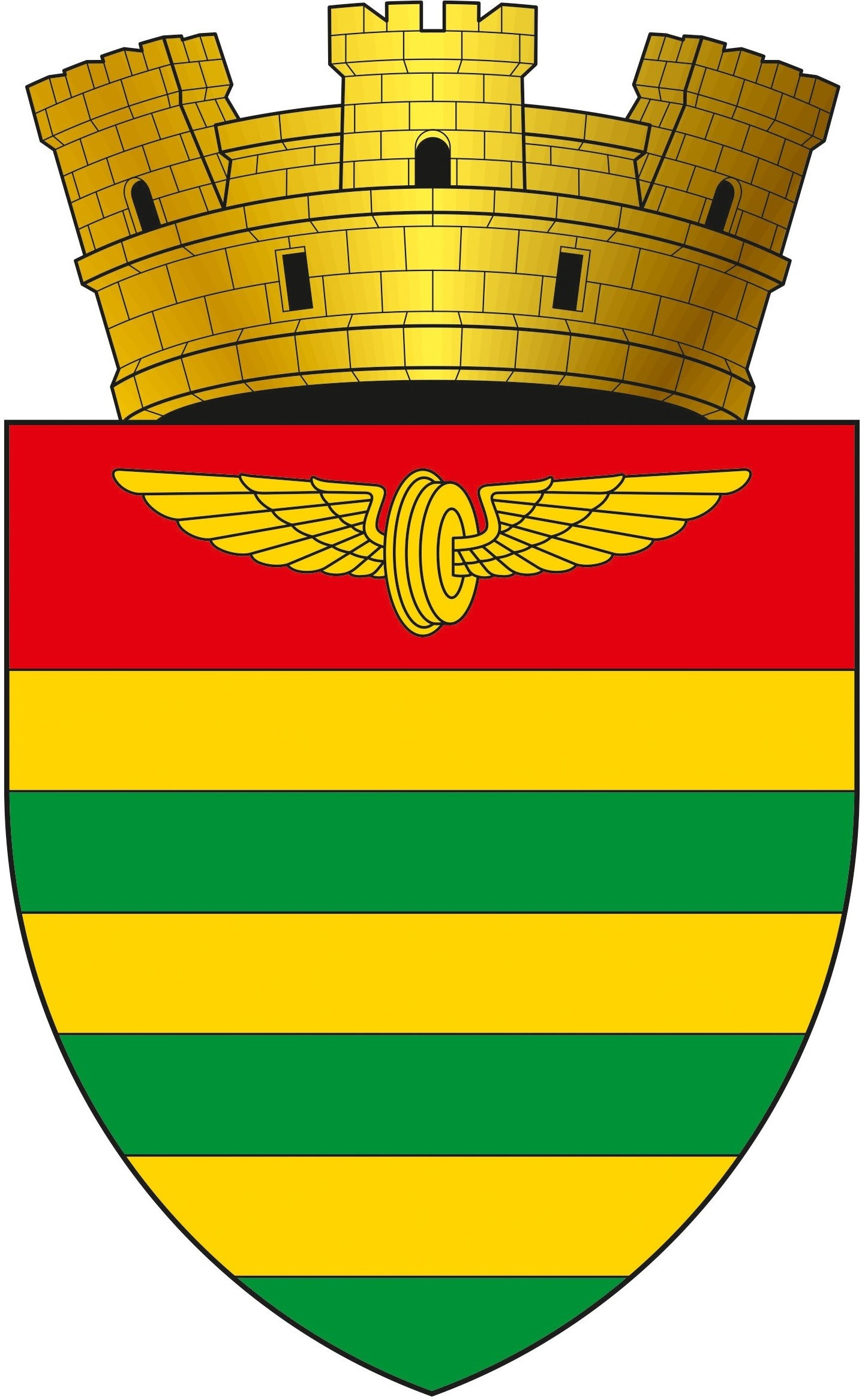
- Flag Coat of arms

- Location within Moldova
- Coordinates: 46°20′01″N 28°57′41″E
- Country: Moldova
- County: Basarabeasca District

Population (2014)
  - Total: 8,471
- Time zone: UTC+2 (EET)
  - Summer (DST): UTC+3 (EEST)
- Climate: Cfb

Basarabeasca (Romanian pronunciation: [basaraˈbe̯aska]) is a city in Moldova. It is the capital of Basarabeasca District.

== Geography ==
The city, formerly an urban-type settlement, is located on the border with Ukraine. It is 94 km to the south of the national capital Chişinău, 25 km from Cimislia, and 25 km from Comrat. The river Cogâlnic flows through the city from northwest to southeast, continuing on to the Black Sea. The main populated areas are in the lowlands. These are effectively divided into several areas, such as Romanovka and Flemynda.

== History ==
A Jewish settlement at the site of Basarabeasca was started in 1846; it was originally named Romanovka in honor of the Russian imperial family of the Romanovs. In 1859 there were 86 resident Jewish families who worked the land, 263 men and 249 women. They owned 1750 desyatinas of farmland. At the time of the abolition of Jewish land tenure in 1866, 57 families were occupied in farming – 209 men and 183 women. They shifted primarily to the business of wine production, working in its sales and trade. In order to improve the lot of the colonists, the Zemstvo of Bender instituted market days weekly on Wednesday. This was done at the request of Captain Fyodor Oleynikov on October 29, 1876.

In 1897, 597 settlers lived in Romanovka (293 men and 304 women). They had established a synagogue and a prayer school (Cheder). According to the Russian census of 1897, 1625 people lived in Romanovka, with 71% (1150 people) being Jewish. The first secular school, where there was only one class, opened in 1899 thanks to Georgiy Gimishli, who helped with the facilities. The class was taught by Anna Shidlovskaya, who worked there for many years. For his support of the school, Gimishli was awarded a silver medal of zeal on December 6, 1904. In the 1905–1906 school year, 12 boys and two girls studied at the school.

The beginning of the 20th century was a time of rapid development of the village; the construction of the Bessarabka railway station began nearby. In 1910 some residents gained telephone service - the Merimshi, Okulish, Andelman, Tsuker, and Imasha families. On December 5, 1912, a new synagogue opened, with Doctor Boris Sverdlov as rabbi. Grigoriy and Vasiliy Gemyushliev traveled to the Russian Tsar to request money for a church, but returned with only 500 rubles; the money was collected primarily from the faithful. In October 1913 the population was 1741, whose property was valued at 346,826 rubles. Two steam mills, belonging to Lemke Adama and Semke Khristian, were valued at 9,420 rubles. The village had a mutual aid fund to help families or persons in need. By 1923 it had become a large village: there were 690 homes, with 1520 men and 1597 women, with a mill, a slaughterhouse, a pharmacy, a primary school, and 15 stores.

On September 11, 1957, while part of the USSR, the village of Romanovka was unified with the former German colony of Heinrichsdorff (in which 273 Germans lived, according to 1943 data). It was renamed Basarabeasca (Bessarabka). In 1968 the population of Basarabeasca was 13,300. There were a working machine repair shop, and rail transport enterprises.

== Demographics ==
According to the 2014 census, the population of Basarabeasca amounted to 8,471 inhabitants, a decrease compared to the previous census in 2004, when 11,192 inhabitants were registered. Of these, 3,959 were men and 4,512 were women.

Ethnic composition of Basarabeasca (2024)
1. Moldovans/Romanians (39.8%)
2. Gagauz (17.3%)
3. Russians (16.3%)
4. Ukrainians (11.1%)
5. Bulgarians (9.31%)
6. Roma (2.32%)
7. Other (3.93%)
Linguistic composition of Basarabeasca (2024)
1. Russian (78.3%)
2. Romanian (18.8%)
3. Gagauz (0.93%)
4. Romani (0.68%)
5. Ukrainian (0.63%)
6. Bulgarian (0.45%)
7. Other (0.06%)

Historical population
Year	Pop.	±%
1959	12,548	—
1970	11,694	−6.8%
1979	13,083	+11.9%
1989	14,517	+11.0%
2004	11,192	−22.9%
2014	8,471	−24.3%

Footnotes:

* There is an ongoing controversy regarding the ethnic identification of Moldovans and Romanians.

* Moldovan language is one of the two local names for the Romanian language in Moldova. In 2013, the Constitutional Court of Moldova interpreted that Article 13 of the constitution is superseded by the Declaration of Independence, thus giving official status to the name Romanian.

== Notable persons ==
- Xenia Deli, 1989 Lingerie Model
- Vladimir Dragoș
- Naum Prokupets, sprint canoer, Olympic bronze in C-2 1,000-meter event, gold in C-2 10,000-meter event at ICF Canoe Sprint World Championships
