= Drago Kolar =

Professor and department head (1932-2000)

Professor Drago Kolar (1932–2000) was a head of the Ceramics Department at the Jozef Stefan Institute (Ljubljana, Slovenia) from 1965 until 1997.

Kolar was one of the world leading scientists in the field of ceramic materials. His main scientific interest was in sintering mechanisms and microstructure development in ceramics, high-temperature phase equilibria and functional ceramics.

He published, together with his co-workers, over 200 publications in international periodicals, over 200 publications in the proceedings of international conferences and co-authored nine patents. Besides his research activities he taught at the University of Ljubljana. He supervised 36 doctoral theses, 54 master's theses and 146 B.Sc. theses.

Among his honours and awards the most distinguished are: "Ambassador of Science of the Republic of Slovenia" (1995), "Honorary Diploma of the International Institute for the Science of Sintering" (1979), "Niobium Medal of the Max-Planck Institute" (1987), "Two Particle Man" recognition, German Powder Met. Soc. (1997).

The IJS magazine No. 79 (February 2000) was dedicated to Kolar (see articles in English by Guenter Petzow from MPI Stuttgart and by J.P. Guha from IJS).

== Awards and honours ==
- Boris Kidrič Award for Highest Scientific Achievements (1982)
- Boris Kidrič Fund Award for Scientific Achievements (1972)
- Boris Kidrič Fund Awards for Innovations and Patents (1974, 1977, 1978 (2x), 1980, 1985, 1986, 1990)
- Ambassador of Science of Republic of Slovenia (1995)
- Iskra Award (1979)
- Fellow of the American Ceramic Society (1989)
- Member of Academia Europaea (London) (1989)
- Member of Academy of Ceramics (Faenza) (1989)
- Titular Member of IUPAC Commission for High Temperature and Solid State Chemistry (1994)
- Member of Sigma Xi Society (1983)
- Honorary Diploma of the International Institute for Science of Sintering (1979)
- Recognition of the Serbian Chemical Society (1973)
- Recognition of Yugoslavian ETAN Society (1979)
- Special Recognition of Iskra Factory for Hybrid Circuits (1975)
- Golden Badge of Jožef Stefan Institute (1985)
- Niobium Medal of Max-Planck Institute (1987)
- "Two Particle Man" recognition, German Powder Met. Soc. (1997)

== Meetings and symposia organised ==
- 3rd Yugoslav Symposium on Modern Inorganic Materials, Ljubljana 1974 (with M. Drofenik)
- 2nd Yugoslav-German Meeting on Materials Science and Technology, Bled 1976 (with M. Komac)
- 5th International Round Table Conference on Sintering, Portorož 1981 (with S. Pejovnik and M.M. Ristić)
- 5th International Conference on Sintering and Related Phenomena, Notre Dame, Indiana, USA 1983 (with G.C. Kuczynski and G. Sargent)
- 8th Yugoslav-German Meeting on Materials Science and Technology, Brdo at Kranj 1987 (with M. Kosec)
- 1st Slovene-German Seminar on Joint Projects in Materials Science and Technology, Portorož 1994 (with D. Suvorov)
