= Adrian Dragoș =

Romanian footballer (born 2007)

Personal information
- Full name: Adrian Cristian Dragoș
- Date of birth: 9 April 2007 (age 19)
- Place of birth: Arad, Romania
- Height: 1.80 m (5 ft 11 in)
- Position: Forward

Team information
- Current team: Progresul Pecica (on loan from UTA Arad)

Youth career
- 2011–2012: Viitorul Arad
- 2012–2022: Atletico Arad
- 2022–: UTA Arad

Senior career*
Years	Team	Apps	(Gls)
2025–	UTA Arad	7	(0)
2026–	→ Progresul Pecica (loan)	1	(0)
- * Club domestic league appearances and goals as of 8 December 2025

Adrian Cristian Dragoș (born 9 April 2007) is a Romanian professional footballer who plays as a forward for Liga III club Progresul Pecica, on loan from Liga I club UTA Arad.
