= Modran =

Settlement in Bosnia and Herzegovina

Modran Модран
Location	BijeljinaBiH
Population – (2013) – (1991 census)	1,044; 1,411
Coordinates	44°40′N 19°11′E
Area code	+387 55
Time zone	CET (UTC +1); CEST (UTC +2)
Website	www.modran.com

Modran (Serbian Cyrillic: Модран) is a settlement in Bijeljina, Republika Srpska, Bosnia and Herzegovina.
