= Vladimir Dragoș =

Moldovan operatic baritone

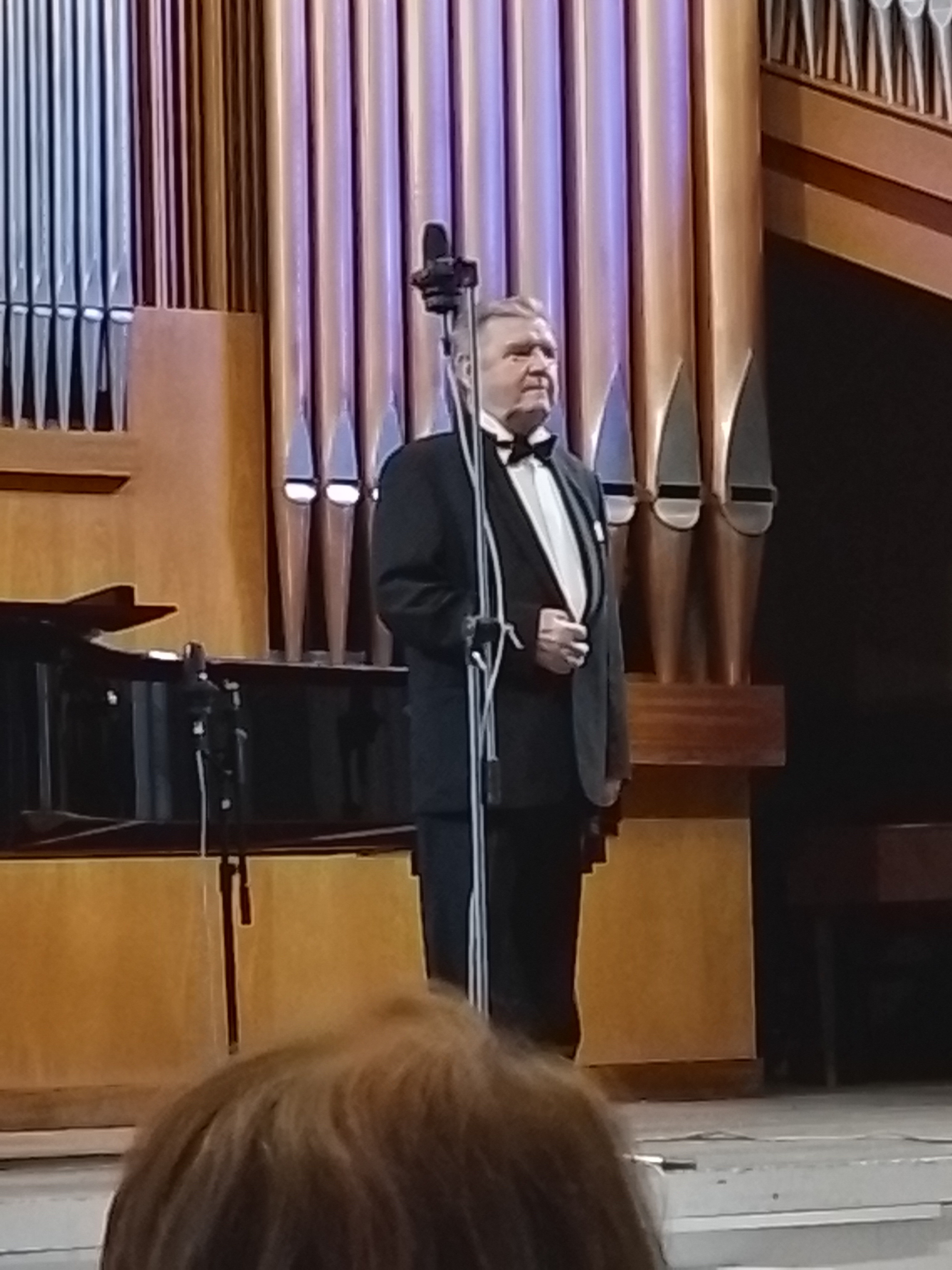
- Vladimir Dragoș in the Organ Hall of Chișinău
- Born: 1 March 1943 (age 83); Basarabeasca, Romania
- Occupation: Operatic baritone
- Years active: 1972 to present

Vladimir Dragoș (born 1 March 1943) is a Soviet and Moldovan operatic baritone.

== Biography ==
Vladimir Dragoș was born on 1 March 1943 in the town of Basarabeasca (at that time, the territory of Romania). Outstanding talent and brilliant vocal skills helped the young singer to enter the Chișinău Institute of Arts named after Gavriil Musicescu, bypassing the music college. After graduating from the Conservatory in 1970, Dragoș first appeared on the opera stage in 1972, singing the role of Rigoletto in Giuseppe Verdi's opera of the same name in Komsomolsk-on-Amur. He began his opera career in Buryatia, at the Ulan-Ude Opera House. Since 1976, he has returned to Moldova, where he has become a soloist of the Chișinău Opera and Ballet Theater. In 1986, he was awarded the medal "For Labor Valor". In 1988, Vladimir Dragoș was awarded the title of People's Artist of the Moldavian Soviet Socialist Republic.

After the collapse of the USSR, he continued to live and work in the Republic of Moldova, where he became a Laureate of the State Prize of Moldova, as well as a Knight of the Order "Gloria Muncii". For many years he worked as the Artistic Director of the National Opera and Ballet Theater of the Republic of Moldova named after Maria Bieșu.

Currently, Vladimir Dragoș teaches vocal art at the Exemplary Art Education Center "Ștefan Neaga" (Chișinău). Dragoș brought up a whole galaxy of opera stars, including Natalia Gavrilan, Petru Racovița, Liliya Sholomey and many others.

On 5 March 2023, Vladimir Dragoș celebrated his eightieth birthday by singing his signature role — Rigoletto — on the stage of the National Opera and Ballet Theater of Moldova. The Moldovan newspaper Săptămână published an enthusiastic review of this performance, in which its author, journalist Aurelian Danilă, described Vladimir Dragoș as one of the most outstanding representatives of vocal art in Moldova. According to Danilă, who recalled the times when the great Soviet-era Moldovan singer Maria Bieșu performed on the stage of the National Opera and Ballet Theater, the Chisinau Opera Theater did not know such powerful ovations and shouts of "Bravo" yet. The article quotes the outstanding opera conductor Alexander Samoilă, who called Vladimir Dragoș a phenomenon of opera in general and Moldovan opera in particular, a genuine Verdi baritone, and the phenomenon of preserving Dragoș' voice, according to the conductor, is associated with a sacrificial attitude to the art that he serves. On 12 March 2023, Vladimir Dragoș's anniversary concert was held with great success in the Chișinău Organ Hall, at which the hero of the day himself, his students and associates performed.

A television film "Vladimir Dragoș Sings" was made about the performing art of Vladimir Dragoș.

== Roles in opera performances ==
- Rigoletto ("Rigoletto" by Giuseppe Verdi);
- Renato ("Un ballo in maschera" by Giuseppe Verdi);
- Nabucco ("Nabucco" by Giuseppe Verdi);
- Macbeth ("Macbeth" by Giuseppe Verdi);
- Iago ("Otello" by Giuseppe Verdi);
- Figaro ("The Barber of Seville" by Gioachino Rossini);
- Germont ("Traviata" by Giuseppe Verdi);
- Amonasro ("Aida" by Giuseppe Verdi);
- Escamillo ("Carmen" by Georges Bizet);
- Tonio ("Pagliacci" by Ruggero Leoncavallo);
- Scarpia ("Tosca" by Giacomo Puccini);
- Sharpless ("Madame Butterfly" by Giacomo Puccini);
- Marcello ("La bohème" by Giacomo Puccini);
- Alfio ("Cavalleria rusticana" by Pietro Mascagni)
- Gryaznoy ("The Tsar's Bride" by Nikolai Rimsky-Korsakov);
- Robert ("Iolanta" by Pyotr Ilyich Tchaikovsky).

== Awards ==
He is the Diploma winner of the Glinka Vocal Competition (1973).

== Touring and creative activities ==
Currently, Vladimir Dragoș goes on tour abroad. Among the countries he visited on tour: Italy, Netherlands, England, Germany, Belgium, Russia, Ukraine, Romania, Bulgaria and others. Especially a lot of reviews in the press about the art of Vladimir Dragoș were published in the UK, in which the singer toured repeatedly. The art of singing Dragoș was described in the British press as outstanding, his performance of the Rigoletto and Scarpia parts was recognized as strong and exceptional.

He performed in collaboration with various well-known performers, including Irina Arkhipova, Elena Obraztsova, Maria Bieșu, Anna Netrebko and others.
