= Dragutin Hrastović =

- Born: Dragutin Hrastović
- Era: Contemporary Christian music
- Works: 4 albums, more than 100 songs

Dragutin Hrastović is a Croatian singer, composer and arranger of contemporary Christian music. He is known for his nickname "Eucharistic Nightingale".

He wrote his first song at the age of 30. During the next fifteen years, he wrote more than 100 songs and published 4 albums: "Ljubav koja preobražava" (Love that transforms), "Dvije zlatne poluge" (Two bullions), "Suze moje majke" (My mother's tears) and "Kralj ljubavi" (King of love).

Among all the songs and arrangements, some compositions stands out, such as "Cijeno neprocjenjiva" (Priceless price; written for Alen Hržica), "Sva si lijepa Marijo" (Mary, you are beautiful at all) and "Mi smo novo nebo" (We are the new sky). Song "Cijeno neprocjenjiva" was included into Anthology of Croatian Christian music, album "Popularna duhovna glazba: 100 originalnih pjesama" (Popular spiritual music: 100 original songs) in edition of Croatia Records.

He collaborated with other Croatian spiritual music performers. He performed on many Christian music festivals, such as Krapinafest, Tonkafest and Karmelfest.
