= Dragoș Plopeanu =

Romanian footballer

Personal information
- Full name: Dragoș Plopeanu
- Date of birth: 9 November 1988 (age 38)
- Place of birth: Bucharest, Romania
- Height: 1.86 m (6 ft 1 in)
- Position: Goalkeeper

Team information
- Current team: Vacant

Youth career
- Dinamo București

Senior career*
Years	Team	Apps	(Gls)
2002–2004	Dinamo II București	6	(0)
2004–2005	Inter Gaz București	38	(0)
2007–2010	Politehnica Timișoara	0	(0)
2007–2008	→ Politehnica II Timișoara (loan)	20	(0)
2008–2010	→ CS Buftea (loan)	56	(0)
2010–2011	CS Buftea	30	(0)
2011–2012	Gloria Buzău	18	(0)
2012–2013	CS Buftea	28	(0)
2013–2014	Rapid București	10	(0)
2014	Oțelul Galați	16	(0)
Total		222	(0)

Managerial career
- 2015–2017: Steaua București (goalkeeping coach)
- 2017–2019: Mongolia (goalkeeping coach)
- 2019–2020: FC Voluntari (goalkeeping coach)
- 2020–2021: Chinese Taipei (goalkeeping coach)
- 2022: ATK Mohun Bagan (goalkeeping coach)
- * Club domestic league appearances and goals

Dragoș Mihai Plopeanu (born 9 November 1988 in Bucharest) is a Romanian former footballer who is a goalkeeping coach

== Club career ==
=== Dinamo București Youth ===
Dragos began his career at the age of 9 progressing through the ranks before leaving in 2004.

=== Inter Gaz București ===
After joining in the summer of 2004 Plopeanu was promoted to the 1st team where he went on to make 38 appearances.

=== Politehnica Timișoara ===
Plopeanu transferred to FC Politehnica Timișoara for a disclosed fee of €100,000. Primarily used in the reserve squad, Dragos went on to make 20 appearances for Politehnica II, before being sent on loan to Buftea.

== Coaching career ==
=== ATK Mohun Bagan FC ===
Dragos was appointed as the coach of ATK Mohun Bagan in January 2022. He has the experience of coaching in Romania, along several other countries.
