= Dragoș Bucurenci =

Romanian communications strategist

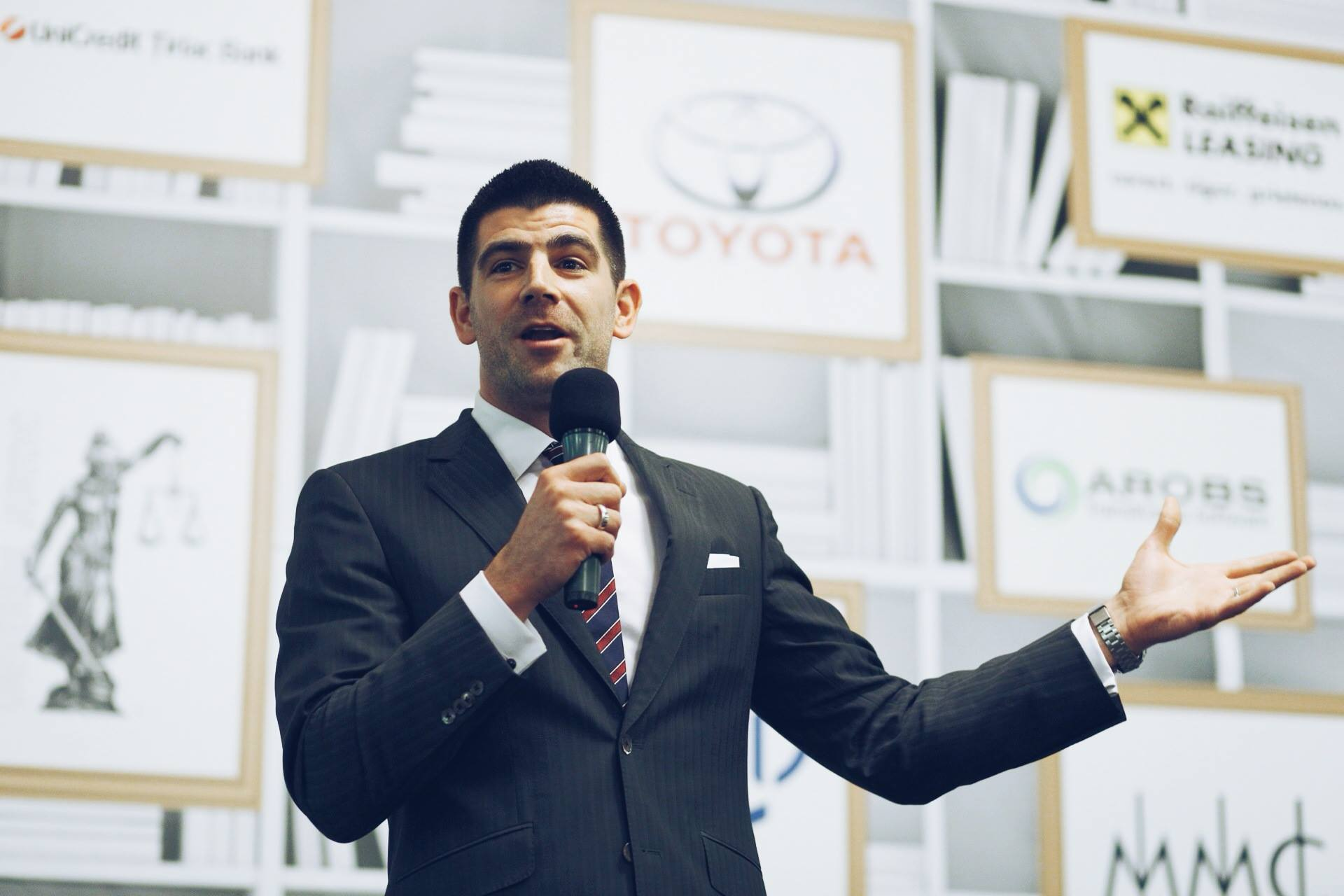
- Born: Dragoș Radu-Bucurenci; August 30, 1981 (age 45); Bucharest, Romania
- Education: Stanford Graduate School of Business; National University of Arts, Bucharest
- Occupations: Environmentalist, journalist

Dragoș Bucurenci (born August 30, 1981) is a Romanian communication strategist and coach, civic activist and television personality. He was named Manager of The Year 2021 by Capital magazine, having received the most number of votes expressed by the readers of the publication. In 2010, his Process Communication Model course was awarded Best Training of the Year Prize at the Romanian Business Edu Gala. In 2014 he joined the cabinet of the European Commissioner for Regional Policy as Communication Adviser, but left a year later citing "different work styles". In 2019, he became communications director for Philip Morris International Romania.

He founded MaiMultVerde, a well-known environmental organizations in Romania. He was featured on the cover of Esquire Romania October 2008 edition, among "15 people who innovate, challenge and change the world we live in".

In 2016, he hosted the Romanian edition of the Survivor television series on ProTV.

== Organizations ==
=== Save the Danube Delta ===
A group of Romanian environmentalists founded "Save the Danube Delta" Association in 2004 in response to the Ukrainian Government's plans to reopen navigation on the Bystroye Canal, which posed a severe threat to the biodiversity of the Danube Delta and sparked an international outcry. Dragoș Bucurenci was appointed Executive Director and coordinated the public campaign against the Ukrainian project.

Bucurenci also led advocacy campaigns for the protection of the wildlife in the Romanian part of the Danube Delta Biosphere Reserve and for the ecological restoration of the large areas of the Danube Delta that the Romanian Communist Government had drained and transformed into agro-industrial zones. The organization successfully enlisted the public support of Prime Minister Calin Popescu-Tariceanu and of President Traian Basescu. In 2006, the Romanian Government announced a plan to invest 37 million euros in the ecological reconstruction of the Danube Delta and issued a 10-year ban on the fishing of endangered species of sturgeons.

In 2007, "Save the Danube and the Delta" Association was awarded the Grand Trophy at the Civil Society Gala, the most prestigious award that a non-profit organization can get in Romania.

=== MaiMultVerde ===
In 2008, Bucurenci founded "MaiMultVerde" ("More Green") Association, under the high patronage of HRH Crown Princess Margareta of Romania, with the aim to increase youth participation in volunteer programs for the environment. "MaiMultVerde" developed partnerships between central and local authorities, private companies and mass-media that resulted in nationwide reforestation and environmental cleanup campaigns. By the end of 2010, the organization had worked with 14,000 volunteers, planted 450,000 saplings and collected 600,000 lbs of waste from natural areas.

A 2004 survey by The Gallup Organization revealed that only 13% of young urban people in Romania had volunteered for charities in the past 12 months and only 8% of volunteers had been involved in environmental programs. In 2010, a survey by GfK showed that the percentage of young urban Romanian who volunteered increased to 29%. Of them, 51% had been involved in environmental programs.

"MaiMultVerde" also created Bucharest's first rent-a-bike system, Cycloteque, in partnership with Unicredit Tiriac Bank.

In 2008, Esquire Romania featured Bucurenci on the cover of its October edition, among "15 people who innovate, challenge and change the world we live in". Later that year, on Romania's National Day, the Romanian Public Television presented Bucurenci with the "Romania in our Hearts" award for his work on promoting volunteerism. In 2009, Infomediu Europa magazine named him "Green Man of the Year".

== Media ==
Bucurenci was a columnist for Elle, Esquire, The One and Evenimentul Zilei, a national newspaper.

He produced and presented television programs on almost all mainstream Romanian TV channels:

- "Dependente" (cultural talk-show), "Puncte pe arta lumii" (infotainment, topic: arts & culture), "Cultura Libre" (cultural talk-show for the younger generation), "Linia verde" (infotainment, topic: ecology), "Buna ca viata" (infotainment, topic: healthy lifestyle), all broadcast by the Romanian Public Television
- "Romania verde" (infotainment, topic: ecology) on Realitatea TV
- "Voluntar de profesie" (reality-show promoting voluntarism) on Prima TV
- "Lectia de Prim Ajutor" (televised first-aid training) on ProTV

In 2006, he defended historian of religion Mircea Eliade in a documentary broadcast by the Romanian Public Television as part of the "Great Romanians" program (a licensed version of BBC's "Great Britons").

In 2010, he competed as a celebrity contestant in the Romanian version of the reality television series Dancing with the Stars.

In 2016, he hosted the Romanian edition of the Survivor television series on ProTV.

== Personal life ==
Bucurenci was one of the first public figures in Romania who spoke openly about their sexuality. In a May 2008 piece for Elle magazine, he came out as bisexual. Ten years later, on the stage of TEDx Baia Mare, he reflected on the "deafening silence" that accompanied his coming-out.

== Education ==
Bucurenci received his BA in Art History and Theory from the National University of Arts in Bucharest, Romania and his MBA from the Stanford Graduate School of Business. He is a certified NLP Coach by the Academy of Coaching and NLP.
