= Drahos =

Drahos or Drahoš is a surname and occasional given name. Notable people with the surname include:

- Béla Drahos (born 1955), Hungarian conductor and flautist
- Lajos Drahos (1895–1983), Hungarian communist politician
- Nick Drahos (1918–2018), American football player
- Peter Drahos, Australian academic
- Jiří Drahoš, Czech politician

== See also ==
- Jonathan Wade-Drahos, American actor
