= Dragon (disambiguation) =

A dragon is a mythical creature, typically with reptile-like traits.

(The) Dragon(s) may also refer to:

== Arts and entertainment ==
=== Characters and fictional entities ===
- Chinese dragon
- Dave Dragon, character played by Hulk Hogan in the 1998 American martial arts movie 3 Ninjas: High Noon at Mega Mountain
- The Dragon (Beowulf)
- Dragon (Dungeons & Dragons), a monstrous creature
- Dragon (Middle-earth), a type of fictional character in J. R. R. Tolkien's books
- Dragon (One Piece)
- Dragon (Shrek), a character in Shrek
- The Dragon, a title for the world's champion against the forces of darkness in Robert Jordan's The Wheel of Time series
- Dragon, a member of Gen13
- Dragon, the leading character in the Image Comics title Savage Dragon
- Dragon Shiryū, a Saint Seiya character
- Dragons (Dragon Prince), mythical beasts
- Dragons (Pern), by Anne McCaffrey
- Richard Dragon, a DC Comics character

=== Films ===
- The Dragon, a 1916 film directed by Harry A. Pollard
- Dragon (2006 film), an action/fantasy film
- Dragon (2011 film), a Hong Kong-Chinese martial arts film
- Dragon (2025 film), Indian Tamil-language coming-of-age film
- Dragon (2027 film), an upcoming Indian Telugu-language action drama film
- Dragon: The Bruce Lee Story, a 1993 biographical film
- Dragons: Fire and Ice (2004 film), animated film
- Dragons 3D, a 2013 film

=== Gaming ===
- Dragon, a version of the video game Mega Man Star Force
- Dragon by Komodo Chess, a chess engine
- Dragon tiles, a type of honor tile in mahjong
- Sicilian Defence, Dragon Variation, a chess opening
- Dragons (Varanae), a 1981 supplement for role-playing games
- Dragons (Mayfair Games), a 1986 supplement for role-playing games

=== Literature ===
==== Novels ====
- Dragon (Brust novel), a 1998 novel by Steven Brust
- Dragon (Cussler novel), a 1990 novel by Clive Cussler
- Dragon (fantasy series), fantasy novels by Laurence Yep (1982–1992)
- The Dragons (novel), a 1996 fantasy novel by Douglas Niles

==== Periodicals ====
- Dragon (magazine), a Dungeons & Dragons magazine
- Dragon Magazine (Fujimi Shobo), a Japanese light novel magazine (started 1988)

==== Short stories ====
- "Dragon" (Kalapugama short story), by Anandasiri Kalapugama (1975)
- "The Dragon" (short story), by Ray Bradbury (1955)
- "Dragon: the Old Potter's Tale", a short story by Ryūnosuke Akutagawa (1919)

==== Other literature ====
- The Dragon (fairy tale), an Italian fairy tale
- Dragon (poem), by Aleksey Tolstoy (1875)
- "The Dragon" (poem), by Abd al-Wahhab Al-Bayyati (1996)

=== Music ===
==== Groups ====
- Dragon (band), a New Zealand/Australian rock group
- Dragons (band), an English group
- The Dragons (band), an American rock group

==== Albums ====
- The Dragon (album), by Vangelis
- Dragon (Jake Shimabukuro album)
- Dragon (Loudness album)

==== Songs ====
- "Dragon" (song), a 2024 song by Liamoo
- "Dragon" by Lou Reed and Metallica from Lulu
- "Dragon" by King Gizzard & the Lizard Wizard from PetroDragonic Apocalypse
- "Dragon", by the Sugarcubes from Life's Too Good
- "Dragon", by Martin Garrix
- "Dragon", by Miriam Bryant
- "Dragons", by Caravan Palace from Caravan Palace

=== Roller coasters ===
- The Dragon (roller coaster), at Legoland
- The Dragon, Ocean Park Hong Kong, in Hong Kong, China
- Dragon (Adventureland), in Altoona, Iowa
- Dragon Challenge, in Orlando, Florida
- Dragon Coaster (Playland), in Rye, New York

=== Television ===
- "The Dragon" (Arrow), nineteenth episode of the 2018 sixth season of the TV show Arrow
- Dragon (Bluey), an episode of the Australian animated television series Bluey
- Dragon (TV series), a Canadian children's TV program
- Dragon Television, a Chinese provincial satellite TV station
- DreamWorks Dragons, a TV series based on How to Train Your Dragon

=== Other arts and entertainment ===
- Dragon (M. C. Escher), a 1952 wood-engraving print by M. C. Escher
- The Dragon (Schwarz), a 1944 fairytale play by Evgeny Schwartz
- Dragon, a 2013 play written by Oliver Emanuel

== Biology ==
=== Animals ===
- Agamidae, a family of lizards, of which many genera are known as dragons, especially in subfamilies Amphibolurinae and Draconinae
  - Amphibolurinae
    - Ctenophorus, an Australian genus of lizards, of which many species are known as dragons
    - Pogona, a genus of Australian lizards, commonly called "bearded dragons"
  - Draconinae
    - Acanthosaura, commonly named as "horned dragons," a genus of lizards, endemic to Southeast Asia
    - Draco, commonly known as "flying dragons," a genus of lizards, endemic to Southeast Asia
- Dragonfish (disambiguation) § Fish, many fish
- Dragonet, fish of the Callionymidae
- Komodo dragon, a large species of lizard found in the Indonesian islands of Komodo

=== Other uses in biology ===
- Antirrhinum, a genus of plants, known as "snap dragon"
- Dracaena, a genus of trees, also known as "dragon tree"
- DRAGON (protein), a membrane receptor protein
- Pitaya, also called "dragon fruit," fruit of several different cactus species
- Saururus cernuus, a species of plants, also called "water dragon"
- Tarragon, a species of perennial herbs, which is called dragon in several languages including its Latin name

== Brands and enterprises ==
- Cathay Dragon, an international airline based in Hong Kong, previously known as Dragonair
- Dragon Models Limited, a toy manufacturer
- Dragon Petroleum, a Welsh fuel company

== Education ==
- Dragon School, a British preparatory school in Oxford, England
- The Dragon Academy, a private school in Ontario, Canada

== Mathematics and computing ==
- Dragon (cipher)
- Dragon (remote sensing)
- AMD Dragon, a platform engineered for gamers
- Comodo Dragon, a freeware web browser
- Dragon chip, a line of Chinese CPUs
- Dragon curve, a family of fractal curves
- Dragon Data, a Welsh computer manufacturer
  - Dragon 32/64, the names of two 1980s home computers
- Dragon NaturallySpeaking, a speech recognition software package
- DRAKON (Russian: ДРАКОН, "dragon"), a programming language used in flight controllers for rockets and space vehicles

== Military ==
- Dragon (firearm), the short version of the blunderbuss
- "Dragons", a USMC helicopter squadron (see: VMM-265)
- BQM-147 Dragon, United States unmanned aerial vehicle
- Focke-Achgelis Fa 223, German World War II helicopter, known in English as Dragon
- HMS Dragon, the name of at least 14 ships (and a building) of the English/British Navy
- M47 Dragon, an American anti-tank missile system
- The Dragons, a display team consisting of 4 x Hawker Hunters of No. 4 Flying Training School RAF, during 1973
- USS Dragon (1861), a Union Navy steamer during the American Civil War
- Dragón, a Spanish development of the Mowag Piranha V Wheeled Infantry Fighting Vehicle

== Nobility and royalty ==
- Dragon Throne, the throne of the Emperor of China
- Order of the Dragon, a former monarchical chivalric order

== People ==
- Vlad II Dracul (1390–1447), duke of Wallachia, nicknamed "Vlad the Dragon"
- Goran Dragić (born 1986), Slovenian basketball player, nicknamed "The Dragon"
- G-Dragon (born 1988), South Korean rapper
- Carmen Dragon (1914–1984), American conductor and composer
- Daryl Dragon (1942–2019), American musician, one half of the duo Captain & Tennille; son of Carmen Dragon
- Tatsumi Fujinami (born 1953), Japanese professional wrestler, nicknamed "The Dragon"
- Bruce Lee (1940–1973), Chinese actor and martial artist, nicknamed "The Dragon"
- Lyoto Machida (born 1978), Brazilian martial artist, nicknamed "The Dragon"
- Ricky Steamboat (born 1953), American professional wrestler, nicknamed "The Dragon"
- Matthew Stevens, Welsh snooker player nicknamed "The Welsh Dragon"
- Don "The Dragon" Wilson (born 1954), American champion kickboxer and actor
- Ryuji Kumita (born 1967), Japanese racing driver who uses the pseudonym "Dragon"

== Places ==
=== Extraterrestrial ===
- Draco (constellation) (Latin for Dragon), a constellation in the far northern sky
- The Dragon, a grouping of galaxies in the field of Abell 370

=== Terrestrial ===
- Dragon, Utah, United States, a ghost town
- Dragon Cone, a volcano in British Columbia, Canada
- Dragon Hill, Uffington, a mountain in England
- "The Dragon", a section of U.S. Route 129 between Deals Gap, North Carolina and Punkin Center, Tennessee, in the United States

== Sports teams ==
=== Africa ===
- AS Dragons (Kinshasa), a soccer team in the Democratic Republic of the Congo
- AS Dragons FC de l'Ouémé, a soccer team in Benin
- ASK Dragão, a soccer team in Angola
- Dragón FC, a soccer team in Equatorial Guinea
- Drakensberg Dragons, South Africa field hockey club

=== Asia ===
- CEC Dragons, the sports teams of the Cebu Eastern College in the Philippines
- China Dragon, an ice hockey team in China
- Chunichi Dragons, a baseball team in Japan
- Jeonnam Dragons (formerly spelled as Chunnam Dragons), a football team in South Korea
- Jiangsu Dragons, a Chinese Basketball Association team
- Kuala Lumpur Dragons, a Malaysian basketball team
- Shanghai Dragons, an Overwatch eSports team in China
- Sichuan Dragons, a baseball team in China
- Team Dragon, nickname for China men's national basketball team
- Welcoat Dragons, a basketball team in the Philippines

=== Europe ===
- Artland Dragons, a German basketball team
- AS Dragon, an association football team from Guadeloupe
- Barcelona Dragons (NFL Europe), an American football team active in Spain from 1991 to 2003
- Barcelona Dragons (ELF), an American football team active in Spain since 2021
- Catalans Dragons, a rugby league club in France
- Celtic Dragons, a netball team in Wales, U.K.
- Delft Dragons, an American football team in the Netherlands
- Dragons (rugby union), a rugby union team in South East Wales, U.K.
- Dragons de Rouen, an ice hockey team in France
- Dragons Rhöndorf, a German basketball team
- Dragons (women's cricket), a women's cricket team in Ireland
- Dublin Dragons, a former American football team in Ireland
- Dudelange Dragons, an American football team in Luxembourg
- Glamorgan Dragons, a cricket team in the United Kingdom
- KHC Dragons, a field hockey club in Belgium
- RC Dragon Brno, a rugby union team in the Czech Republic
- Wrexham A.F.C., a Welsh association football team known as the Red Dragons

=== North America ===
- C.D. Dragón, a soccer team in El Salvador
- Chesapeake Dragons, a soccer team in the U.S.
- Dayton Dragons, a baseball team in the U.S.
- Dragon Racing, an American auto racing team
- Dragons, nickname of sports teams at Jefferson High School in Jefferson, Georgia in the U.S.
- Dragons, nickname of sports teams at Lake Orion High School in Lake Orion, Michigan in the U.S.
- Drexel Dragons, the sports teams of Drexel University in the U.S.
- Lane College Dragons, the sports teams of Lane College in the U.S.
- Los Angeles Dragons (American football), a former American football team in the U.S.
- Los Angeles Dragons, an Australian rules football team in the U.S.
- Moorhead Dragons, the sports teams of Minnesota State University Moorhead in the U.S.
- New York Dragons, an Arena Football League team in the U.S.
- Portland Forest Dragons, a former name of the Oklahoma Wranglers, an Arena Football team in the U.S.
- San Antonio Dragons, an ice hockey team in the U.S.
- San Francisco Dragons, a field lacrosse team in the U.S.
- Seattle Dragons, an American football team in the U.S.
- Shreveport Swamp Dragons, formerly the Shreveport Captains, a baseball team in the U.S.
- Thomasville Dragons, a women's soccer team in the U.S.
- Tiffin Dragons, the sports teams at Tiffin University in the U.S.
- Verdun Dragons, an ice hockey team in Canada
- Wisconsin Dragons, a women's tackle football team in the U.S.

=== Oceania ===
- A.S. Dragon (Tahiti), a soccer team
- Darwin Dragons SC, a soccer team
- Engadine Dragons, a junior rugby league team
- Northcote Football Club, aka the Northcote Dragons, an Australian rules Football team
- St. George Dragons, a rugby league team
- St. George Illawarra Dragons, a rugby league football club
- Shellharbour City Dragons, a rugby league team
- South Dragons, a former team in the Australasian National Basketball League (2006–2009)

== Transport ==
=== Air ===
- de Havilland Dragon, a small commercial aircraft
- Douglas B-23 Dragon, a twin-engined bomber aircraft
- Independence Dragon, a German paraglider design
- Sopwith Dragon, a British single-seat fighter biplane

=== Land ===
- Dennis Dragon, a bus
- Dragon Automobile Company, an American manufacturer (1906–1908)
- Kaiser Dragon, a 1950s American car
- Dragon (1848–1872), a GWR Iron Duke Class locomotive
- Dragon (1873–1892), a South Devon Railway Buffalo class locomotive
- Dragon (1880–1892), a GWR Rover class locomotive
- Dragon (1891–1915), a GWR 3031 Class locomotive
- Dragon (2009–present) Newag E6ACT, an electric freight locomotive

=== Space ===
- Dragon (rocket), a French research sounding rocket
- SpaceX Dragon capsule, used to transport cargo to and from the International Space Station
- SpaceX Dragon 2 capsule, also used to transport crew to and from the International Space Station

=== Water ===
- Dragon (keelboat), a sailing yacht, used in racing
- Dragon boat, a narrow canoe-style boat, used for the sport of dragon boat racing

== Other uses ==
- Dragon (Ninurta), a figure in Sumerian religion
- Dragon (zodiac), in the Chinese zodiac
- Dragon reactor, a gas-cooled nuclear reactor in England
- Satan, referred to several times in the Book of Revelation as the "Dragon"
- Welsh Dragon, the flag of Wales
- In the Japanese board game shogi, the rook and bishop promote to a "dragon (king)" and a "dragon horse"
- The 2020 Middle East storms of 23 March 2020 and following days are sometimes called the "Dragon storms"

== See also ==
- Draconian (disambiguation)
- Dracaena (disambiguation)
- Drache (disambiguation)
- Draco (disambiguation)
- Dragone (disambiguation)
- Dragon I (disambiguation)
- Dragon II (disambiguation)
- Red Dragon (disambiguation)
- Sea Dragon (disambiguation)
