= Dragon II =

Dragon II, Dragon-2, dragon two, or variation, may refer to:

== Space travel ==
- SpaceX Dragon 2, a class of space capsules manufactured by SpaceX
- Dragon C2+ (May 2012), the second SpaceX Dragon mission
- SpaceX CRS-2 (March 2013; a.k.a. SpX-2), the second SpaceX ISS resupply
- Crew Dragon Demo-2 (May 2020; a.k.a. DM-2), the second Dragon 2 flight and its first crewed flight
- SpaceX Crew-2 (April 2021), the second operational SpaceX ISS crew transport

== Other uses ==
- Dragon 2, a model of the biplane de Havilland Dragon
- Dragons II: The Metal Ages, a 2005 animated Mega-Blocks film and sequel to Dragons: Fire and Ice
- Issue No. 2 of Dragon magazine
- M47 Dragon II, a shoulder-fired anti-tank missile

== See also ==
- Dragon (disambiguation)
- Double Dragon (disambiguation)
- Twin Dragon (disambiguation)
