= Sunrunner (disambiguation) =

The Dragon Prince and Dragon Star trilogies comprise six connected fantasy novels written by Melanie Rawn.

Sunrunner may also refer to:

- Pontiac Sunrunner or Asüna Sunrunner, a mini SUV marketed by General Motors
- Sunrunner's Fire, the third book in the Dragon Prince trilogy by Melanie Rawn
- SunRunner, the bus rapid transit (BRT) service offered by the Pinellas Suncoast Transit Authority
- Sunrunner (Transformers), an autobot
- Sunrunner, the name of the University of Michigan Solar Car Team's first car
