= Dragoni (disambiguation) =

Dragoni is a comune in the Province of Caserta, Campania, Italy.

Dragoni may also refer to:

- Parco Dragoni in Forlì, a green area in the frazione Ronco of Forlì, Emilia-Romagna, Italy

== People with the name ==
- Gabriella Battaini-Dragoni (born 1950), Italian author, educator and politician
- Giovanni Dragoni (1540–1598), Italian composer
- Giulia Dragoni (born 2006), Italian footballer
- Maria Dragoni (born 1958), Italian operatic soprano

== See also ==
- Dragon (disambiguation)
- Dragone (disambiguation)
