= Dragon 1 (disambiguation) =

Dragon 1 was a class of fourteen partially reusable cargo spacecraft developed by SpaceX.

Dragon 1 or Dragon I may also refer to:

- Dragon1, a visual enterprise architecture
- deHavilland Dragon I, a model of the biplane de Havilland Dragon
- Dragons I: Fire and Ice (2004 film) animated Mega-Blocks film

== See also ==
- SpaceX COTS Demo Flight 1 (December 2010), the first SpaceX Dragon mission
- How to Train Your Dragon 1, first film in a film series
- Dragon (disambiguation)
