= Double Dragon (disambiguation) =

Double Dragon may refer to:

- Double Dragon, a 1987 video game series produced by Technōs Japan Corporation
  - Double Dragon (video game), 1987 video game, first game of the aforementioned series
  - Double Dragon (TV series), 1993 animated TV series, based on the aforementioned video game series
  - Double Dragon (film), 1994 film, based on the aforementioned video game series
  - Double Dragon (Neo Geo), 1995 fighting video game based on the 1994 film
- DoubleDragon Corporation, Philippine real estate development company
- Double Dragon Publishing, Canadian literary publisher founded in 2000, specializing in e-books
- Double Dragon (band), Australian heavy metal band from Adelaide, South Australia, formed 2003
- Double Dragon (music producer), Hip-Hop/R&B music production brothers
- Order of the Double Dragon (simplified Chinese: 双龙宝星; traditional Chinese: 雙龍寶星; pinyin: Shuānglóng Bǎoxīng; lit. 'Double Dragon Precious Star') an order awarded by Qing Dynasty Empire of China
- Double Dragon (hacking group)
- Double Dragon (restaurant), a restaurant and bar in Portland, Oregon, U.S.

== See also ==
- Dragon (disambiguation)
- Double (disambiguation)
- Hong (rainbow-dragon) (Chinese: 虹; pinyin: hóng or jiàng; Wade–Giles: hung or chiang; lit. 'rainbow') a two-headed dragon of Chinese mythology
- Twin Dragon (disambiguation)
- Dragon II (disambiguation)
