= Kate Elliott =

Kate Elliott may refer to:

- Kate Elliott (actress) (born 1981), New Zealand television and film actress
- Kate Elliott (writer), pen name of American fantasy and science fiction writer Alis A. Rasmussen (born 1958)
