= Mark Hudson (businessman) =

British farmer, retired company director and former chairman (born 1947)

Sir Mark Henry Hudson
- Born: 1947 (age 78–79)
- Occupation: Farmer

Sir Mark Henry Hudson, KCVO (born 1947) is a British farmer, retired company director and former chairman of the Council of the Duchy of Lancaster.

Born into a family of Yorkshire farmers and trawlers in 1947, Hudson was educated at Sedbergh School and studied agriculture at St Catharine's College, Cambridge, and Wye College near London. He subsequently worked in dairy farming and joined the board of the agricultural and distribution business NWF Group in 1985; he was the company's chairman from 2006 until he retired in 2017.

Hudson joined the Council of the Duchy of Lancaster in 2006, and in 2015 succeeded Lord Shuttleworth as Chairman of the council. He served for two years, before retiring in 2017. He was appointed a Knight Commander of the Royal Victorian Order in the 2017 Birthday Honours.
