= Stronghold (disambiguation) =

A stronghold or fortification is a military construction or building designed for defense.

Stronghold may also refer to:

== Computing and gaming ==
- Stronghold (1993 video game), a real-time strategy game by Stormfront Studios
- Stronghold (2001 video game), a real-time strategy game by Firefly Studios
- Stronghold, a 1998 expansion set for Magic: the Gathering from the Rath Cycle
- Stronghold, a warring faction in Heroes of Might and Magic V: Tribes of the East
- FIRST Stronghold, the 2016 FIRST Robotics Competition game
- Stronghold, a fictional location in the video game Minecraft

== Music ==
- Stronghold (Magnum album)
- Stronghold (Summoning album)
- Stronghold – The Collector's Hit Box, an album by Jennifer Rush
- "Strongholds", a 2022 song by Chris Tomlin from Always

== Places ==
- Stronghold (Washington, D.C.), a neighborhood in the District of Columbia, U.S.
- Stronghold Center or Stronghold Castle, a Tudor-style castle in Oregon, Illinois, built by newspaper publisher Walter Strong

== Other uses ==
- Stronghold (horse), an American thoroughbred horse
- Stronghold (novel), a novel by Melanie Rawn
- Stronghold, Edward Sedgewick, a character in the comic book series Harbinger
- "Stronghold", an episode of Stargate SG-1
- Stronghold (film), a 1951 movie starring Veronica Lake
- Stronghold (pet medicine) or Selamectin, a parasiticide and anthelmintic for cats and dogs
- HMS Stronghold, a Royal Navy S-class destroyer launched in 1919 and sunk in 1942

== See also ==
- The Stronghold (disambiguation)
- Safe seat, in politics, a seat in a legislative body that is regarded as fully secured by a particular political party
