= Double Dragon Three =

Double Dragon Three or variation, may refer to:

- Double Dragon 3: The Rosetta Stone (ダブルドラゴン 三 ザ・ロゼッタストーン, Daburu Doragon 3: Za Rozetta Sutōn), a 1990 arcade game
- Double Dragon III: The Sacred Stones (1991 video game) released on the Famicom-NES Nintendo Entertainment System

== See also ==
- Double Dragon (disambiguation)
