= The Dragon Token =

1992 novel by Melanie Rawn

- Author: Melanie Rawn
- Cover artist: Michael Whelan
- Language: English
- Series: Dragon Prince and Dragon Star trilogies
- Genre: Fantasy
- Publisher: DAW Books
- Publication date: 1992
- Publication place: United States
- Media type: Print (Hardcover & paperback)
- Pages: 656
- ISBN: 0-88677-542-6
- OCLC: 27392826
- Preceded by: Stronghold
- Followed by: Skybowl

The Dragon Token is a 1992 fantasy novel by American author Melanie Rawn. It is the second novel in the Dragon Star trilogy.

== Plot summary ==
Pol is torn between anger and guilt at his father's death and relief that he can finally act out against the invading Vellant'im. As he and his mother, Sioned, try to uncover more about the invaders, they discover hidden secrets within an ancient mirror that had belonged to Sioned's old friend, Camigwen. An ancient sorcerer, Lord Rosseyn, is trapped within the mirror. Rosseyn tells Pol of his past and teaches him more about his sorcerous heritage. Meanwhile, Pol's wife and daughters are attacked by the Vellant'im. High Princess Meiglan and Rislyn are taken captive, but Andry, who had been travelling from Goddess Keep, saves Jihan.

The southern princedoms are slowly being reclaimed, although many lives are lost, including Prince Kostas of Syr and Rihani of Ossetia. The Dorvali resistance mounts raids on the enemy, preventing them from joining the forces on the Continent, and Kierst-Isel remains secure. Goddess Keep is guarded by the Devr'im in Andry's absence.

Other princedoms, such as Grib and Fessenden, have so far remained neutral, but ambitious and/or devoted Princes try to rouse their fathers and their people.

In Firon the sorcerers capture the royal seat in Balarat and control the princedom through young Prince Tirel. Idalain, Tirel's squire in the absence of the boy's father, tries to protect the boy, but is forced to pretend he is unaware that the princedom is being overtaken. Yarin, a sorcerer and Tirel's uncle, names himself Regent of Firon. In order to keep Idalain busy, Yarin orders the squire to teach his kinsman, Aldiar, swordplay.

As the Vellanti War continues, Pol, his family, and allies must hurry to discover a weakness in their enemies and must overcome past hatreds in order to work together.
