= The Golden Key (novel) =

1996 novel

- Author: Melanie Rawn, Jennifer Roberson, Kate Elliott
- Cover artist: Michael Whelan
- Language: English
- Genre: Fantasy
- Publisher: DAW Books
- Publication date: 1996
- Publication place: United States
- Media type: Print (Hardcover)
- Pages: 784
- ISBN: 0-88677-691-0
- OCLC: 35268865
- Dewey Decimal: 813/.54 21
- LC Class: PS3568.A8553 G65 1996

The Golden Key is a 1996 fantasy novel co-written by authors Jennifer Roberson (first act), Melanie Rawn (second act), and Kate Elliott (third act).

Set in what might loosely be described as an alternative Spain, the novel traces a family of painters who, by nature of their Gifts, can influence events around them. In the Grijalva family, the Gifted males are usually sterile and short-lived; the women, who may have a talent for painting, but do not have the Gift for the particular type of painting that alters what it portrays, are generally kept within the family to produce children. However, one woman per generation is official mistress to the ruling Duke's Heir, so that the family maintains its influence at Court. The story develops when a particularly Gifted and unscrupulous Grijalva painter finds a way to continue living through successive generations. As the political and social climate changes, including revolutions in neighboring countries and democratic challenges to the ruling Dukes, this increasingly conservative painter seeks to hold on to the past, and especially his first love, whom he has imprisoned in a painting.

Throughout the book, special emphasis is placed on iconography and a set of possibly Arabic/Moorish spells that bend events to the will of the painter. The connection between the ruling Dukes and the Grijalva family is shown to be more far-reaching and subtle than at first appears. The development in painting styles is used as a metaphor for political changes that mirror western European history, especially in France and Italy from 1500 to (say) 1820. The succession of paintings in the ducal gallery (which turns into the national gallery) is the lens through which we see the historical and personal events that make up this fantasy history.

== Further plans ==
The original plan for The Golden Key was that it would lead to three more novels, one by each of the authors. Melanie Rawn would write The Diviner (or The Diviner's Key), Kate Elliott would write The Warrior, and Jennifer Roberson would write The Seeker. The Diviner has been published in August 2011, but plans for the other two books are respectively described as "cancelled" and "on indefinite hold."
