= Skybowl =

1993 novel by Melanie Rawn

- Author: Melanie Rawn
- Cover artist: Michael Whelan
- Language: English
- Series: Dragon Prince and Dragon Star trilogies
- Genre: Fantasy
- Publisher: DAW books
- Publication date: 1993
- Publication place: United States
- Media type: Print (Hardcover & paperback)
- Pages: 776
- ISBN: 0-88677-595-7
- OCLC: 29945005
- Preceded by: The Dragon Token

Skybowl is a 1993 fantasy novel by American author Melanie Rawn. It is the third novel of the Dragon Star trilogy.

== Plot introduction ==
The Vellanti War continues with the invading Vellant'im moving ever closer to their goal: conquering the High Prince. Pol, the High Prince, is forced to make his last stand at Skybowl with Andry, the Lord of Goddess Keep, by his side. Across the Continent, Pol's allies are starting to regain control of their lands. Tilal, Prince of Ossetia, is cutting a path through the southern princedoms, while Arlis, Prince of Kierst-Isel, and Laric, Prince of Firon, attempt to defeat the sorcerers controlling the North.

== Plot summary ==
As the death toll rises and Pol's list of allies grows ever thinner, he must work with people once thought enemies and join all the forces of the Continent together in order to defeat the Vellant'im.

Pol discovers allies in the Sorcerers of the Old Blood, who will help him defeat the invading Vellant'im. With this newfound strength and the knowledge gained from Lord Rosseyn in the mirror, Pol, Sioned, and the other Lords of the Desert begin to form a plan for their last stand. A ros'alath, much like the one used previously at Goddess Keep, would be constructed by Pol and Andry with the aide of the Sunrunners of Goddess Keep. The main difference between the two walls being that this one would not kill. The diarmadh'im would be woven into the wall in order to withstand the steel blades of the enemies and protect the faradh'im, though they refused to be wove by Andry due to the Lord of Goddess Keep's transgressions against them.

In Firon, Aldiar helps Idalian and Tirel escape. He then saves them and Prince Laric's entourage from a blizzard. During the journey to Balarat, Firon's royal seat, Aldiar discovers that Rohannon had become addicted to dranath. With Arlis' permission, Aldiar purges the drug from Rohannon's system. Rohannon then discovers that Aldiar is in fact a sorcerer and a woman, Aldiara. After Rohannon's recovery, the group makes their way North to reclaim Laric's princedom.

To the South, Ostvel is able to infiltrate Meadowlord and secure the princedom from both the traitorous Chiana and the Vellant'im. Tilal's army meets up with the remnants of his brother's army, now led by Saumer of Kierst-Isel, and together they head North into the Desert. Along the way they stop to retrieve the Dragon Tears, which were used to protect Faolain Riverport.

Prince Amiel of Gilad takes control of an army of physicians and aides whatever people he can. Prince Elsen of Grib, although crippled, rides to the aide of Goddess Keep, when it once again falls under attack. These Princes, along with other personages of power, joined the war at last, forsaking their Ruling Princes' stances of neutrality.

Back in The Desert, Sioned and the other ladies form a plan to diminish the Vellanti army and rid the invaders of their superstitious priests. The women pose as servants, while Ruala 'gives' Skybowl to the Vellanti High Warlord. The women then proceed to give the priests poisoned food. The priests die, but the women are caught and held captive.

The final battle begins. Pol is able to free Sioned, who is able to weave all the faradhi and diarmadhi minds that Pol calls together. Andry and his Sunrunners are also in the weaving. The ros'salath is formed, but a call for blood is heard and dragons enter the weaving. Andry wrests control from Pol, and the ros'salath begins to kill. Pol calls on more minds in an attempt to regain control. Aldiar (really Aldiara) offers Pol access to all the sorcerers' minds in Balarat - her kinsmen. With this new strength of diarmadhi minds, Pol is able to overpower Andry. The ros'salath stops killing; instead it renders nearly all the Vellant'im unconscious.

Seeing his army crumble, the High Warlord kills Meiglan. Pol, enraged, kills him. Andry, whose mind had been stretched between this weaving, Goddess Keep, and a dragon, is lost on the light. To the North, Aldiara, Rohannon, and her kinsmen are immobile. Prince Laric is easily able to reclaim his princedom.

In the end, the Vellant'im are all rounded up and shipped back to the Vellanti Islands, along with Chiana and her son, who had aided them. Ostvel is named Prince of Meadowlord and Chayla is named Lady of Goddess Keep. Pol is officially confirmed as High Prince, the Faradh'rei and the Diarmadh'rei.

== Awards and nominations ==
- 1994 - Locus Poll Award, Best Fantasy Novel (Place: 18)

== Critical reception ==
Kirkus Reviews criticized the length of the novel, describing the plot as being "padded out to more than 700 blubbery pages."
