= Dragone =

Dragone may refer to:

- Dragone (company), a Belgian creative company
- Dragone (river), a river of the Amalfi Coast, Italy

== People with the surname ==
Dragone (/drəˈɡoʊn/; Italian: [draˈɡoːne]; origin from within Italy. Notable people with the surname include:

- Franco Dragone (born 1952), Italian theatre director
- Giuseppe Cavo Dragone (born 1957), Italian naval officer
- Maureen Dragone (1920–2013), American journalist
- Corrado Dragone, an American engineer for whom the Crossed Dragone is named

== See also ==
- Dragon (disambiguation)
- Dragoni (disambiguation)
