= The Stronghold =

The Stronghold may refer to:

- The Stronghold (novel), a 1974 Scottish children's historical novel by Mollie Hunter
- The Stronghold (2017 film), a Ukrainian adventure/fantasy film
- The Stronghold, a 2021 French action thriller film also known as BAC Nord
- The Stronghold, a 1940 novel by Dino Buzzati also published as The Tartar Steppe
- The Stronghold, a 2015 novel by Albrecht Behmel

== See also ==
- Stronghold (disambiguation)
