= Drache =

Drache is a German word meaning "dragon". It may refer to:

== People ==
- Daniel Drache, contemporary scholar in Canadian and international political economy, globalization studies, communication studies
- Eric Drache, American professional poker player, cardroom manager and consultant for NBC
- Heinz Drache (1923–2002), German film actor
- Hiram Drache, American historian

== Ships ==
- SMS Drache, several ships
- Yugoslav minelayer Zmaj, renamed Drache after being captured by Germans in 1941

== See also ==
- Fa 223 Drache ("Dragon"), a helicopter developed by Germany during World War II
- Draché, a commune in the Indre-et-Loire department in central France
- Drachen Fire, an Arrow Dynamics roller coaster that operated from 1992 to 1998, at Busch Gardens Williamsburg
- Der Kampf mit dem Drachen ("The Battle with the Dragon"), a 300-verse ballad by Friedrich Schiller
