= The Mageborn Traitor =

1997 novel by Melanie Rawn

- Author: Melanie Rawn
- Original title: The Mageborn Traitor
- Cover artist: Michael Whelan
- Language: English
- Series: Exiles
- Genre: Fantasy
- Publisher: DAW
- Publication date: March 1, 1997
- Publication place: US
- Pages: 626
- ISBN: 0-88677-730-5
- OCLC: 36402324
- Dewey Decimal: 813/.54 21
- LC Class: PS3568.A8553 M34 1997
- Preceded by: The Ruins of Ambrai

The Mageborn Traitor is a 1997 fantasy novel written by American author Melanie Rawn. It is the second book in the Exiles Trilogy.

== Plot summary ==
The Mageborn Traitor continues the story of Glenin, Sarra, and Cailet. Divided into two parts, the first part is separated into three sections: 'Wraiths', 'Twins', 'Prentices'; as is the second part: 'The Hunt', 'The Chase', 'The Kill'.

Continuing from the end of 'The Ruins of Ambrai', the beginning sees little change in the characters' circumstance. However, this is quickly amended. After the first section, 'Wraiths', time lapses at a much faster pace. From Cailet's dreams of building the Mage Hall, this is quickly seen to be her reality. Similarly, Sarra's children become the focus of the story and the respective sections 'Twins', 'Prentices' sees their rapid maturation from children to young adults.

As characteristic of her works, Melanie Rawn deftly handles the multiple story lines. Whereas 'The Ruins of Ambrai' established her world-building, 'The Mageborn Traitor' extends it. It is difficult to pin down the exact main storyline of the story - there are many - or the true meaning of the title 'The Mageborn Traitor', though the obvious idea is that it is one of Cailets Mages who happens to betray them all near the end of the novel, unravelling all that Cailet has worked for.

However, the overriding plotline to the story is the battle between the Mage Guardians and the Malerrisi. The former is represented by Cailet and Sarra and the latter by the eldest sister, Glenin Feiran.

== Lenfell ==
As is typical of a Rawn novel, the planet Lenfell is thoroughly realized through the unfolding action of the two books. The first book hints at Lenfell's habitation being the result of humans fleeing Earth's demise (though this hint is very brief). Lenfell is a matriarchal society that is racially integrated. However, all the problems of social divides are still prevalent.

Rawn integrates the history with the plot. The reader is reminded throughout this and the previous novel of the Waste War between the Mage Guardians and Lords of Malerris which ravaged the planet, creating sparse areas of barren lifeless land and birth defects that continue throughout the generations. The social divides are due to a system where the families with most defects are classed as Fifth Tiers. This 'Tier system' ascends until those with lesser defects are classified as 'First Tiers' and those with little or no defects are classified as 'Bloods'.

Rawn spends much of her novels disputing this system, which may represent her concerns for issues in her contextual background. These views are mostly articulated through politically minded middle-child Sarra. In 'The Mageborn Traitor', Sarra attempts to right the wrongs of her society through her position of Councillor in Lenfell's ruling government, and she is an active voice of change. However, it is evident through the latter half of 'The Mageborn Traitor' that the rapid change of Lenfell is doing it more harm than good.
