= The Star Scroll =

1989 novel by Melanie Rawn

- Author: Melanie Rawn
- Cover artist: Michael Whelan
- Language: English
- Series: Dragon Prince and Dragon Star trilogies
- Genre: fantasy
- Publisher: DAW Books
- Publication date: 1989
- Publication place: United States
- Media type: Print (Hardcover & paperback)
- Pages: 582
- ISBN: 0-7564-0304-9
- OCLC: 60813533
- Preceded by: Dragon Prince
- Followed by: Sunrunner's Fire

The Star Scroll is a fantasy novel by American author Melanie Rawn. The second novel in the Dragon Prince trilogy, it begins fourteen years after the events in Dragon Prince.

== Plot summary ==
While on the island of Dorval, the Sunrunner Meath uncovers ancient scrolls in the ruins of an ancient Sunrunner keep. Concerned about the content and odd star symbols, Meath decides to these "Star Scrolls" to the leader of the Sunrunners, Andrade. Lady Andrade appoints Andry, nephew of High Prince Rohan, to translate the scrolls with the help of Hollis, his brother Maarken's unofficial betrothed. As Andry and Hollis work through the translation and the embedded code, they learn that the scrolls deal with ancient sorcerers and sorcery. They are unaware that the scrolls' existence and rediscovery is known to sorcerers in hiding. Mireva, a sorceress, forms a plan to retrieve the scrolls. One of her charges, Segev, Ianthe's youngest son, travels to Goddess Keep to pose as a young faradhi in order to steal the scrolls. He addicts Hollis to dranath as a cohort, but Andry disrupts Segev's plan.

Meanwhile, an arrogant upstart called Masul attempts to proclaim himself Roelstra's son and heir. The whispers of this heir lead to an assassination attempt on Pol's life. To proclaim Pol's position as Prince of Princemarch, Rohan and Pol travel through Princemarch. Pol meets the local Lords and earns his people's favor by participating in their traditions. Unfortunately, another assassination attempt is made, this time ending in the death of Maeta, one of Rohan's most favored guards.

At the Rialla, most of the discussion is over Masul, whether or not he is Roelstra's heir, and whether or not it even matters. As the Princes debate the issue, Segev continues to drug Hollis, who in turn draws away from Maarken. Then, Andrade claims that she can show the events of the past by using sorcery from the scrolls. Gleeful at the turn of events, Segev uses sorcery during her conjuring in order to kill her. Andry becomes Lord of Goddess Keep. Though saddened by Andrade's death, the debate of Masul continues; her conjure proved nothing. At last a duel is proposed between Masul and Pol. Maarken, first cousin to Pol, fights in Pol's place as Pol has yet to be knighted. During the battle, Segev uses sorcery against Maarken. Seeing Maarken in pain snaps Hollis out of her drugged state, and she kills Segev. Masul nearly kills Maarken, but at the last minute, Rohan intervenes and kills him with a pair of thrown daggers.

As the Desert entourage travels home, accompanied by Hollis, who is slowly recovering, a valley filled with dragons is discovered. The site will become Pol's palace, Dragon's Rest. Sioned, who had earlier 'bumped' into a dragon on sunlight, attempts to 'speak' with a dragon. This time she succeeds and a bond is formed between human and dragon.
