= Dragon Prince =

Fantasy novel by Melanie Rawn

- Author: Melanie Rawn
- Cover artist: Michael Whelan
- Language: English
- Series: Dragon Prince and Dragon Star trilogies
- Genre: Fantasy
- Publisher: DAW Books
- Publication date: 1988
- Publication place: United States
- Media type: Print (Hardcover & paperback)
- Pages: 576
- ISBN: 0-88677-450-0
- OCLC: 32462928
- Followed by: The Star Scroll

Dragon Prince is a fantasy novel by American author Melanie Rawn. It is the first book of the Dragon Prince trilogy.

== Plot summary ==
Rohan is heir to the throne of The Desert and its chief holding, Stronghold. His father, Prince Zehava, is unsure of his son's ability to rule, but is wounded in a dragon hunt and Rohan is suddenly the ruling Prince. He must solidify his right to rule by outwitting The Desert's antagonists, chiefly the High Prince Roelstra, in order to protect his lands and maintain peace throughout the world.

His aunt, Andrade, the Lady of Goddess Keep and highest ranking of the faradhi, or Sunrunners, gifted humans who can use light to communicate, warns that the High Prince will try to take over the Desert by marrying one of his daughters to Rohan and then killing him. To decline a royal marriage would in turn insult Roelstra, so she offers a marriage with Sioned, another of her Sunrunners. Marriage between a prince and a Sunrunner is unheard of, but Rohan is smitten by a vision of Sioned that Andrade conjures in fire for him.

Rohan persuades Sioned to help him trick High Prince Roelstra into signing various treaties while he pretends to choose between princesses. Sioned pretends to be unsure of Rohan as her groom, and the two have a merry time with their charade at the tri-annual Rialla (a fair and gathering of princes). Rohan pretends to be a foolish, ignorant young man. The other princes initially believe the masquerade. Roelstra, in turn, is interested in Sioned, both as a woman and a faradhi.

High Prince Roelstra is an evil, cunning man and the father of seventeen daughters. Despite a marriage and a series of mistresses, he never succeeds at conceiving a son and heir. His latest mistress, Lady Palila, is pregnant during the Rialla. Roelstra's eldest daughter, Princess Ianthe, schemes with her sister Pandsala to switch Palila's baby for a girl if it is a son. Pandsala, thinking Roelstra will marry her to Prince Rohan if Palila helps her, plans to turn the tables on Ianthe and help Palila switch another daughter for a boy. They bring four pregnant waiting-women along, planning to induce labor in them when Palila's begins.

Rohan and Roelstra ultimately spar over Sioned, and Roelstra is infuriated to discover Rohan played him for a fool. Ianthe betrays Palila and her sister, and gains her father's trust. In return, she is granted the castle of Feruche, an important outpost on the border between Roelstra's and Rohan's lands. Roelstra gives Pandsala and the new baby, named Chiana (for "treason" in an old language), to Andrade. He burns Palila alive in her bed.

Rohan and Sioned are married and return to the Desert, but Sioned fails to conceive a hoped-for heir. She suffers a series of miscarriages, and the entire realm is decimated by Plague in the ensuing years. Sioned is comforted by a vision of herself with Rohan's child at her breast, although she knows she cannot bear his baby.

Ianthe's men capture Rohan and bring him to her at Feruche castle, where she seduces him, convincing the drugged prince she is Sioned. Rohan discovers the truth and violently rapes Ianthe. Ianthe also captures Sioned, locks her in a lightless dungeon underneath Feruche and allows her castle guards to rape her. Sioned realizes the child in her vision is Ianthe's, and refrains from killing her when Ianthe finally releases them.

Rohan and Sioned return to find Stronghold besieged. Rohan goes to war with Roelstra while Sioned waits out Ianthe's pregnancy. Rohan doubts he can claim this child as his, although Sioned is confident they can defeat Roelstra and claim Ianthe's son as their own.

When Ianthe gives birth, Sioned returns to Feruche, steals Ianthe's newborn son, and burns Castle Feruche to the ground. Sioned names the child Pol, which means "star" in the Old Tongue. At the same time, Rohan kills Roelstra in a duel and becomes High Prince in his stead. The novel ends with the other princes proclaiming fealty to High Prince Rohan and High Princess Sioned, and accepting Prince Pol, the new Sunrunner heir.

== Reviews ==
Library journal said that "this first of a series ... should appeal to readers of fantasy and epic romance".

== Awards and nominations ==
- 1989 – Compton Crook Award, Compton Crook Award (Balticon – Best 1st Novel) (Nomination)
- 1989 – Locus Poll Award, Best First Novel (Place: 6)
