= The Ruins of Ambrai =

1994 novel by Melanie Rawn

- Author: Melanie Rawn
- Original title: The Mageborn Traitor
- Cover artist: Michael Whelan
- Language: English
- Series: Exiles
- Genre: Fantasy
- Publisher: DAW
- Publication date: 1994
- Publication place: US
- Pages: 848
- ISBN: 0-88677-668-6
- OCLC: 33499361
- Followed by: The Mageborn Traitor

The Ruins of Ambrai is a 1994 fantasy novel written by American author Melanie Rawn. It is the first novel in the Exiles Trilogy and is set in the fictional world of Lenfell.

== Plot summary ==
In Lenfell's far past, its population was decimated by the Waste Wars, and the ruling class has emerged based on the ability to have healthy children. This leads to a very matriarchal society in which many of the traditional gender roles are reversed, with women holding nominal power and men used as marriage tools with little autonomy.

The plot centers around a war between two rival magical and political factions, the Mage Guardians and the Lords of Malerris, one who seeks to guide and guard, and one that seeks to rule. In the midst of this war are the four primary characters, Glenin, Sarra, and Cailet Ambrai, sisters who were torn apart after the destruction of Ambrai, their home, and Collan Rosvenir, a Minstrel with no memory of his past.

The book starts with Collan, a young man with no memory of his life prior to being enslaved by Scraller Pelaris. Due to his beautiful singing voice, Col is set to be castrated in order to preserve it, an act from which he is rescued by Gorynel Desse, who then takes him to a cabin in the forest of Sheve Dark, where he serves as a nurse and student to Bard Falundir, the world's most famous Bard, who was crippled by the First Councillor Avira Anniyas when he wrote the Long Sun, a satire that would have exposed her as a Malerissi. Once he comes of age and is deemed sufficiently trained, Gorynel Desse appears to wipe his memory and send him out into the world as an itinerant Minstrel.

The three girls are descendants of the Ambrai line. After a political confrontation, the father, Auvry Feiran, takes Glenin to Ryka Court. The mother, Maichen Ambrai, takes Sarra to Ostinhold, where Maichen gives birth to Cailet, but then dies. Sarra is then taken to live in Roseguard with Lady Agatine and Orlin. Cailet stays in Ostinhold as a relative of the Ostins

== Reception ==
Dean Evans reviewed The Ruins of Ambrai for Arcane magazine in 1996, rating it a 5 out of 10 overall. Evans comments that "If you make it past the lengthy scene-setting, a sprawling tale of sibling rivalry unfolds, a political mud-bath that pits sister against sister against sister. It's neatly constructed and pacy, but lacks that certain something that would make it a fantasy 'must-have'. Ruins is a canned swords-and-sorcery tale and a fairly unremarkable one at that."

== Reviews ==
- Review by Carolyn Cushman (1994) in Locus, #406 November 1994
- Review by Penny L. Kenny (1995) in Starlog, January 1995
- Review by Dan Silver (1995) in Realms of Fantasy, April 1995
- Review by Lynne Bispham (1996) in Vector 188
