= Court of Fives =

Book by Kate Elliott

- Author: Kate Elliott
- Cover artist: Wes Youssi
- Language: English
- Series: Court of Fives
- Genre: Young adult, fantasy, adventure
- Publisher: Little, Brown Books for Young Readers
- Publication date: August 18, 2015
- Publication place: United States
- Media type: Print (hardback & paperback)
- Pages: 448 (hardback, first edition)
- ISBN: 978-0316364195

Court of Fives is the first high fantasy book in the Court of Fives series by Kate Elliott. It was released on August 18, 2015.

== Themes ==
- Racial inequality - In the novel, people are treated differently depending on their skin color. The light-colored Saroese people are seen to have an elevated status in society compared to the dark-colored and coiled haired Efeans. The Efean people are looked down upon and called "Commoners", they are overlooked, and often dispensable to the ruling class. In turn, many of the Efeans despise and do not trust the Saroese.
- Personal identity - The main character Jessamy comes from 2 backgrounds. Her father is an immigrant of old Saro who moved to Efea in search of a better life, and her Mother is a native from Efea. Due to this, Jessamy is labeled a "mule" referring to the fact that she contains the physical attributes of both the Saroese and Efean people. She is conflicted about where she fits into society. Jessamy is raised to be a "Patron" (Saroese) like her father, however the other Patrons will never accept her as she looks too Efean with her coiled hair and dark skin. However, she is not fully accepted by the Efeans either as she has lighter skin than them and acts like a Patron. Throughout the book she slowly reconnects with her Efean heritage and learns about the power she has about being of mixed race.
- Cultural differences - Many of the cultural differences in the novel are based on the Greco-Roman rule of Egypt. In Greece it was common practice to kill weak or excess female infants. However, in Egypt, all babies were often kept regardless of any physical condition. The author takes this same idea and puts it into the Saroese-Efean Society. By native Efean people, all female children are kept, and by Saroese people, excess female children are discarded.. This is seen in Jessamy's family, as she has 3 other sisters. All their Patron neighbors simply cannot comprehend why her father kept all of his daughters.

== Characters ==
- Jessamy "Jes" - Goes by Jes in a close family, she is strong and energetic, very smart and sharp-minded, with very flexible reflexes and power. Loves Court of fives very much. Has 1 older sister, 1 twin sister, and 1 younger sister listed below. Father is a Patron and works on a high position in the army, Mother is Commoner who hasn't ever had a male child, so Jes is considered as a 'mule' in society. Fights in the Court and makes friends with Kal. But problems arise in the family, and family is threatened by Lord Gargaron, so she has to join with Lord, to look after her families survival.
- Lord Kalliarkos "Kal" - Nephew of Lord Gargaron, he doesn't want to join the army, so he goes into Court. Is a Patron, and friend of Jes, helps Jes to save her family from certain death.
- Bettany "Bett" - Called Bet by close family, is the twin of Jes and called crazy at many times. Gets very angry and passionate at times, and hates with a passion. She hates how women are viewed in society and how she is confined, and can't do things males can do, she hates father for being mean to her mother, and she loves her mother dearly.
