= Crossroads (book series) =

High fantasy book series by Kate Elliott

- Spirit Gate, Shadow Gate, Traitor's Gate
- Author: Kate Elliott
- Country: United States
- Language: English
- Genre: High fantasy
- Publisher: Tor Books, New York
- Published: 2007–2010; 2015
- Preceded by: The Crown of Stars Series
- Followed by: The Spiritwalker Trilogy

The Crossroads series is a novel series of high fantasy by Kate Elliott. The story takes place in a land known as the Hundred as well as several neighbouring lands. The story revolves around a large cast of characters who struggle against a growing army that is slowly covering the land with its shadow. The army is led by a mysterious group of people known as Guardians and in particular by a woman. The ultimate goal of the Guardians is yet to be revealed.

== Book One: Spirit Gate ==
In the first book in the Crossroads series, we are introduced to Reeve Joss, a proud and vain man who searches for answers to the murder of his lover Marit. At the same time, newlywed couple Mai and Anji are sent into exile when political turmoil threatens their lives. They decide to go to the Hundred and start a new life with an entourage of servants and soldiers under Anji's command. The outlanders soon find that this new land that they thought would be a resting place has been thrown into turmoil as bands of brigands and thieves pillage small villages and a much larger army stands poised to attack the cities. Looming over the intersecting paths of each lead character is the question of where the Guardians have gone. Why did they abandon their people, and what has happened to them?

== Book Two: Shadow Gate ==
The second book focuses on the Guardians. We are introduced to Marit, the Reeve who died at the beginning of the series. Early in the book, it is revealed that somehow she was brought back from death before she could pass through the Spirit Gate and into an afterlife. As Marit searches for answers about who she has become, she encounters several other Guardians who were once ordinary people: a young woman named Kiriya who came from the plains beyond the Hundred, the long-lost brother Hari who outlanders Mai and Shai believe to be dead, and a man who dresses as an envoy of Ilu. Meanwhile, after the successful defence of the city of Olossi, the Qin have begun to settle down and build their own community around a new Reeve Hall nicknamed Naya Hall after the oil of naya that repelled the invaders. Bai accompanies a small band of men and a woman to infiltrate the army in the North, while her brother Kesh travels back to the southern lands to find out information about a group of assassins that has been sent to kill Anji and his men.

== Book Three: Traitor's Gate ==
The third book of the Crossroads trilogy recounts how the forces of the Hundred, under the command of Anji, defeat the army of the Star of Light led by the corrupted Guardians, and how in the aftermath Anji unexpectedly takes over the Hundred himself. The remaining faithful Guardians (Jothinin, the last of the original group other than Night; Kirit; Marit) reveal to Joss and others how to kill a Guardian, and one by one all the other Guardians are killed. Kesh and his Ri Amarah companions return from their trip south, and Kesh courts Mai's friend Maravia (to eventual success and Mai's chagrin). Shai and Bai travel through the army of the Star of Light and eventually kill Night, the leader of the corrupt Guardians. Mai discovers Indiyabu, where the Guardians were first created (though she and her allies never quite seem to make the explicit connection), and tries to shelter Hari there, but Anji eventually returns alone and kills him. Anji also later kills Joss, by killing Scar, but unknown to him both Joss and Scar return as Guardians, Joss wearing the gold cloak he had recently taken from Radas. In Indiyabu, Mai, who gave birth to a son, Atani, in the pool where the firelings are born, is later attacked by her servant Sheyshi, who turns out to be an agent of Anji's mother, who wants Mai dead in order to marry Anji to a Sirniakan princess. Mai appears to drown in the pool, and is believed dead. However, the firelings save not only her but her second child, growing in her womb, and when Mai emerges months later she has also discovered all the Guardian cloaks (including Hari's) which Anji and his men locked in chests and threw into that same pool. Realizing Anji's betrayal and learning of his intent to marry another wife, she rejects him, and keeps their daughter while Atani remains with Anji as his future heir. Much later, Mai is revealed to have taken the cloaks from Indiyabu and when the remaining cloaks surprise her with the help of reeves not under Anji's control, she willingly frees the cloaks so that they may jess new Guardians.

== Book Four: Black Wolves ==
Black Wolves (2015) is a novel by Elliott that takes place in the same universe as Crossroads, occurring several decades later and featuring a new cast of characters. The novel was intended to be the first installment of a trilogy but the publisher decided to cancel the subsequent volumes, rendering it a stand-alone spin-off. Elliott eventually regained the rights, but has stated that without a publisher, the future of the trilogy is uncertain.

== Novels ==
- Elliott, Kate (2006). Spirit Gate, Tor Books, New York. ISBN 978-0-7653-4930-9
- Elliott, Kate (2008). Shadow Gate, Tor Books, New York. ISBN 978-0-7653-4931-6
- Elliott, Kate (2010). Traitor's Gate, Tor Books, New York. ISBN 978-0-7653-4932-3
- Elliott, Kate (2015). Black Wolves, Tor Books, New York. ISBN 978-0-3163-6869-8
