= Ouroboros =

Symbolic serpent with its tail in its mouth

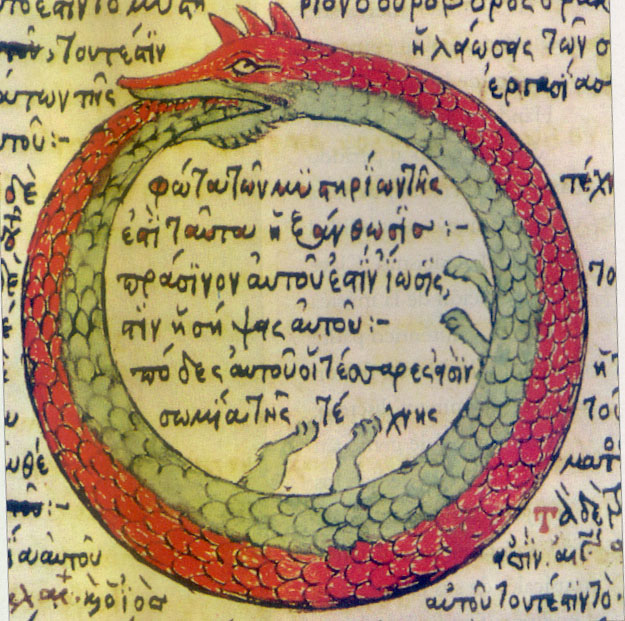
A dragon-like ouroboros in a 1478 drawing in an alchemical tract

The ouroboros (/ˌʊərəˈbɒrəs/) or uroboros (/ˌjʊərəˈbɒrəs/) is an ancient symbol often used to represent the eternal cycle of life which depicts a snake or dragon eating its own tail. The ouroboros entered Western tradition via ancient Egyptian iconography and the Greek magical tradition. It was adopted as a symbol in Gnosticism, Hermeticism, and alchemy. The symbol has appeared in various mythologies and fictional works.

== Name and interpretation ==
The term derives from Ancient Greek οὐροβόρος, from οὐρά oura 'tail' plus -βόρος -boros '-eating'.

The ouroboros is often interpreted as a symbol for eternal cyclic renewal or a cycle of life, death and rebirth; the snake's skin sloughing symbolises the transmigration of souls. The snake biting its own tail is a fertility symbol in some religions: the tail is a phallic symbol and the mouth is a yonic or womb-like symbol.

== Historical representations ==
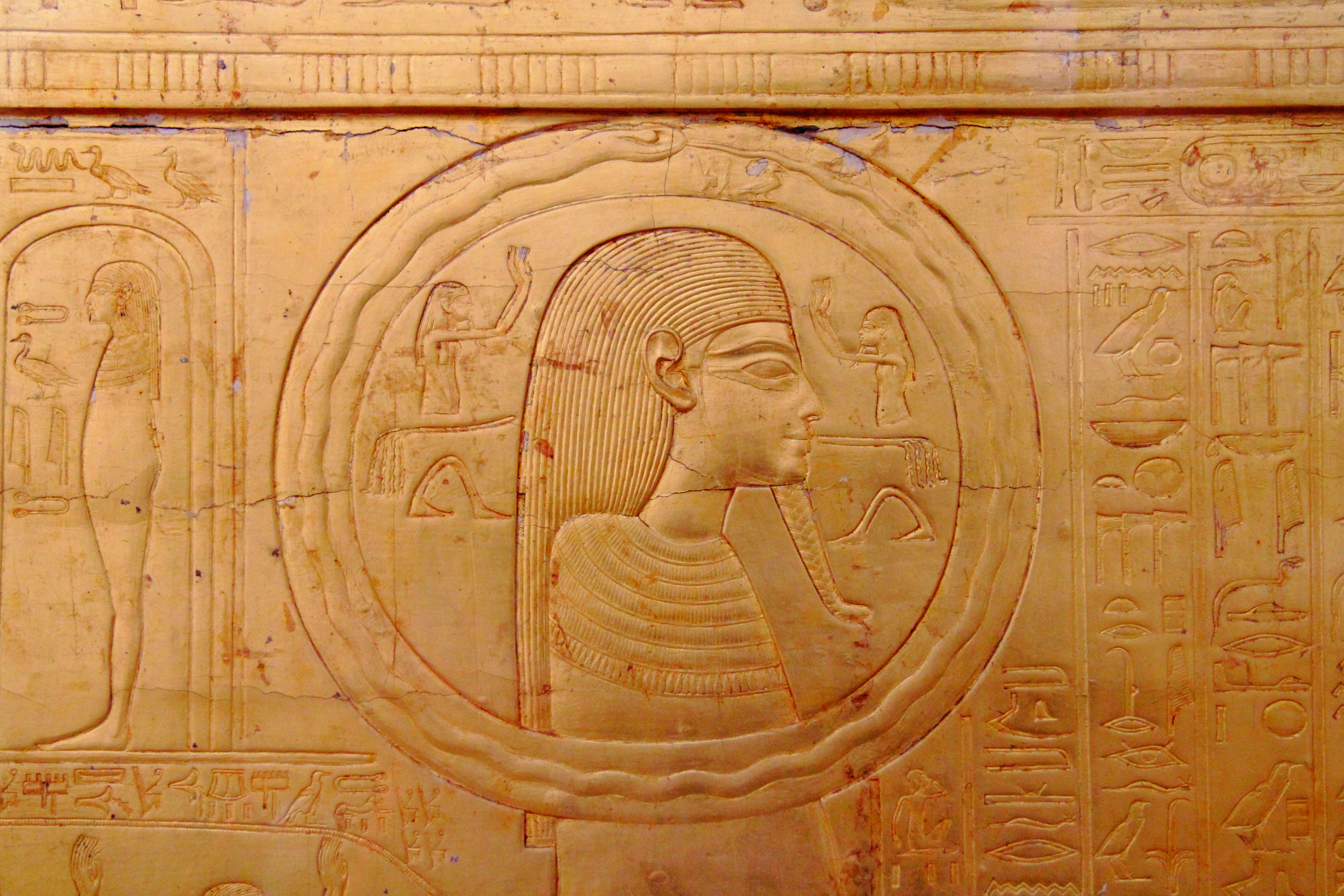
First known representation of the ouroboros, on one of the shrines enclosing the sarcophagus of Tutankhamun

=== Ancient Egypt ===
One of the earliest known ouroboros motifs is found in the Enigmatic Book of the Netherworld, an ancient Egyptian funerary text in KV62, the tomb of Tutankhamun, in the 14th century BCE. The text concerns the actions of Ra and his union with Osiris in the underworld. The ouroboros is depicted twice on the figure: holding their tails in their mouths, one encircling the head and upper chest, the other surrounding the feet of a large figure, which may represent the unified Ra-Osiris (Osiris born again as Ra). Both serpents are manifestations of the deity Mehen, who in other funerary texts protects Ra in his underworld journey. The whole divine figure represents the beginning and the end of time.

The ouroboros appears elsewhere in Egyptian sources, where, like many Egyptian serpent deities, it represents the formless disorder that surrounds the orderly world and is involved in that world's periodic renewal. The symbol persisted from Egyptian into Roman times, when it frequently appeared on magical talismans, sometimes in combination with other magical emblems. The 4th-century CE Latin commentator Servius was aware of the Egyptian use of the symbol, noting that the image of a snake biting its tail represents the cyclical nature of the year.

=== Gnosticism and alchemy ===
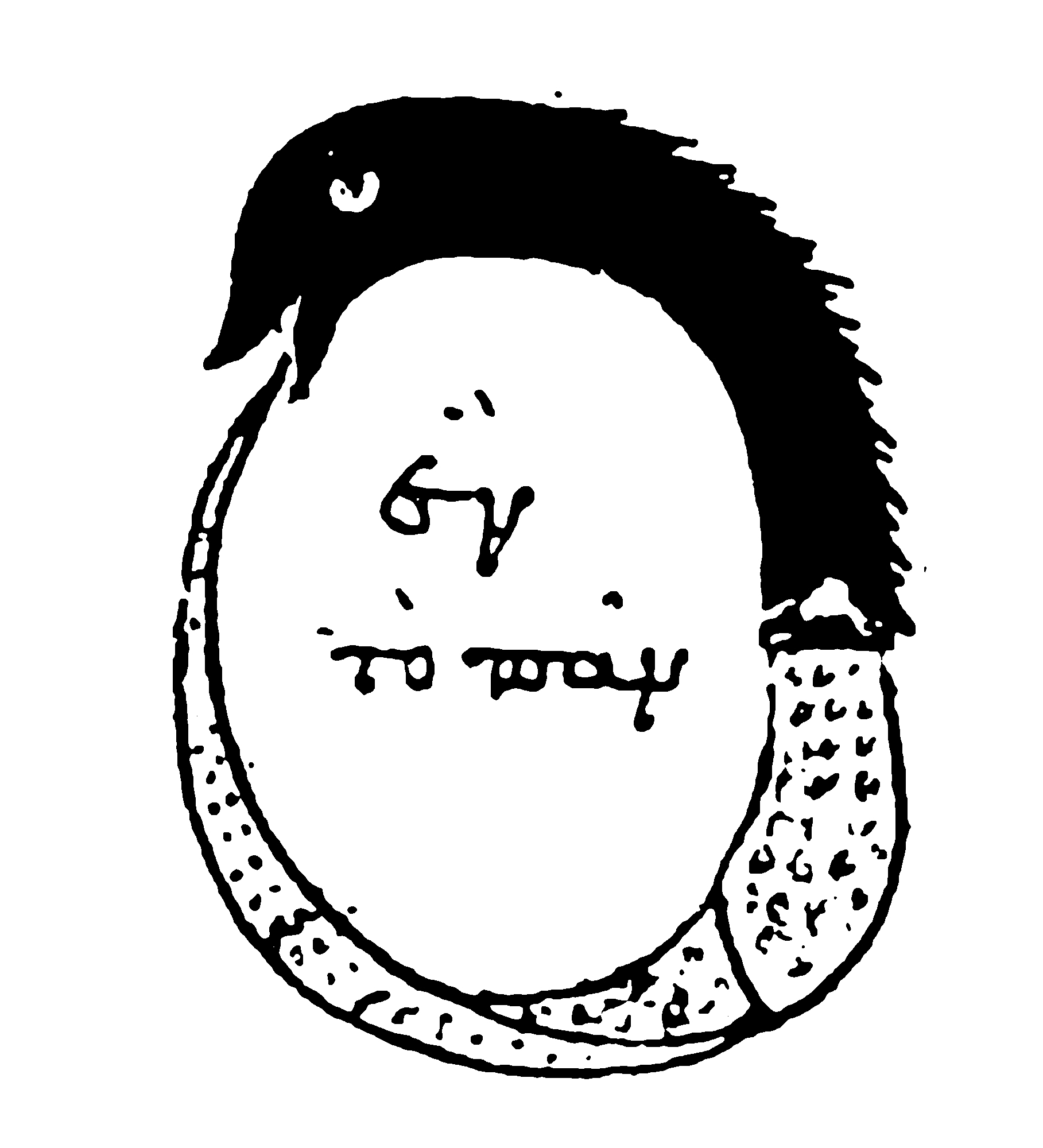
Early alchemical ouroboros illustration with the words ἓν τὸ πᾶν ("The All is One") from the work of Cleopatra the Alchemist in MS Marciana gr. Z. 299. (10th century)

In Gnosticism, a serpent biting its tail symbolised eternity and the soul of the world. The Gnostic Pistis Sophia (c. 400 CE) describes the ouroboros as a twelve-part dragon surrounding the world with its tail in its mouth.

The famous ouroboros drawing from the early alchemical text, The Chrysopoeia of Cleopatra (Κλεοπάτρας χρυσοποιία), probably originally dating to the 3rd century Alexandria, but first known in a 10th-century copy, encloses the words hen to pan (ἓν τὸ πᾶν), "the all is one". Its black and white halves may perhaps represent a Gnostic duality of existence, analogous to the Taoist yin and yang symbol. The chrysopoeia ouroboros of Cleopatra the Alchemist is one of the oldest images of the ouroboros to be linked with the legendary opus of the alchemists, the philosopher's stone.

A 15th-century alchemical manuscript, The Aurora Consurgens, features the ouroboros, where it is used among symbols of the sun, moon, and mercury.

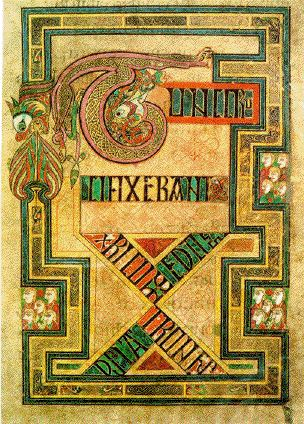
A highly stylised ouroboros from The Book of Kells, an illuminated Gospel Book (c. 800 CE)

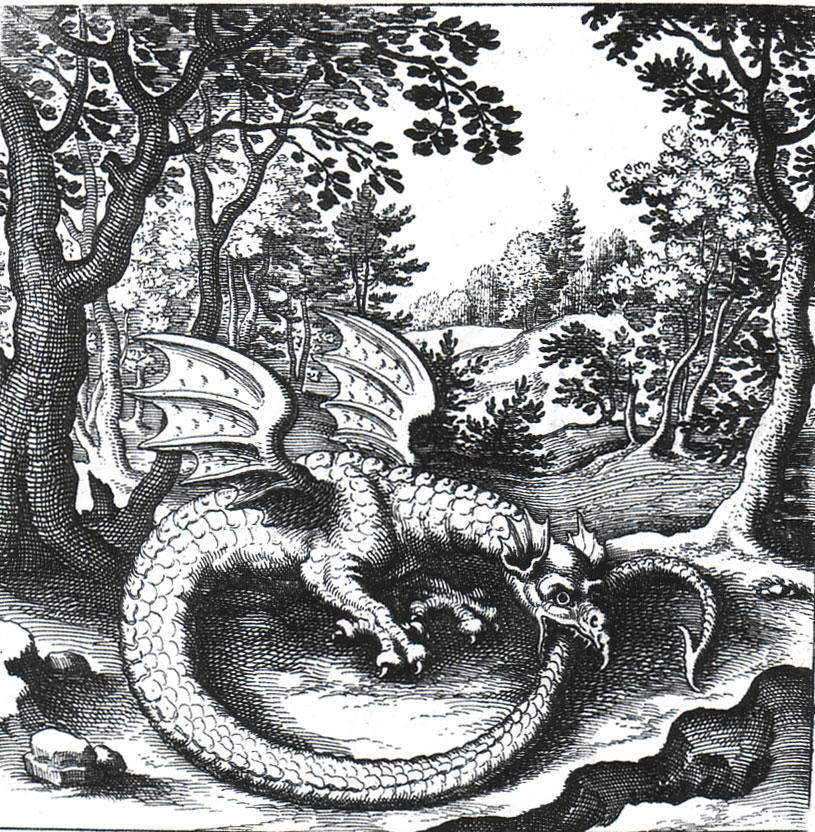
Engraving of a wyvern-type ouroboros by Lucas Jennis, in the 1625 alchemical tract De Lapide Philosophico. The figure serves as a symbol for mercury.

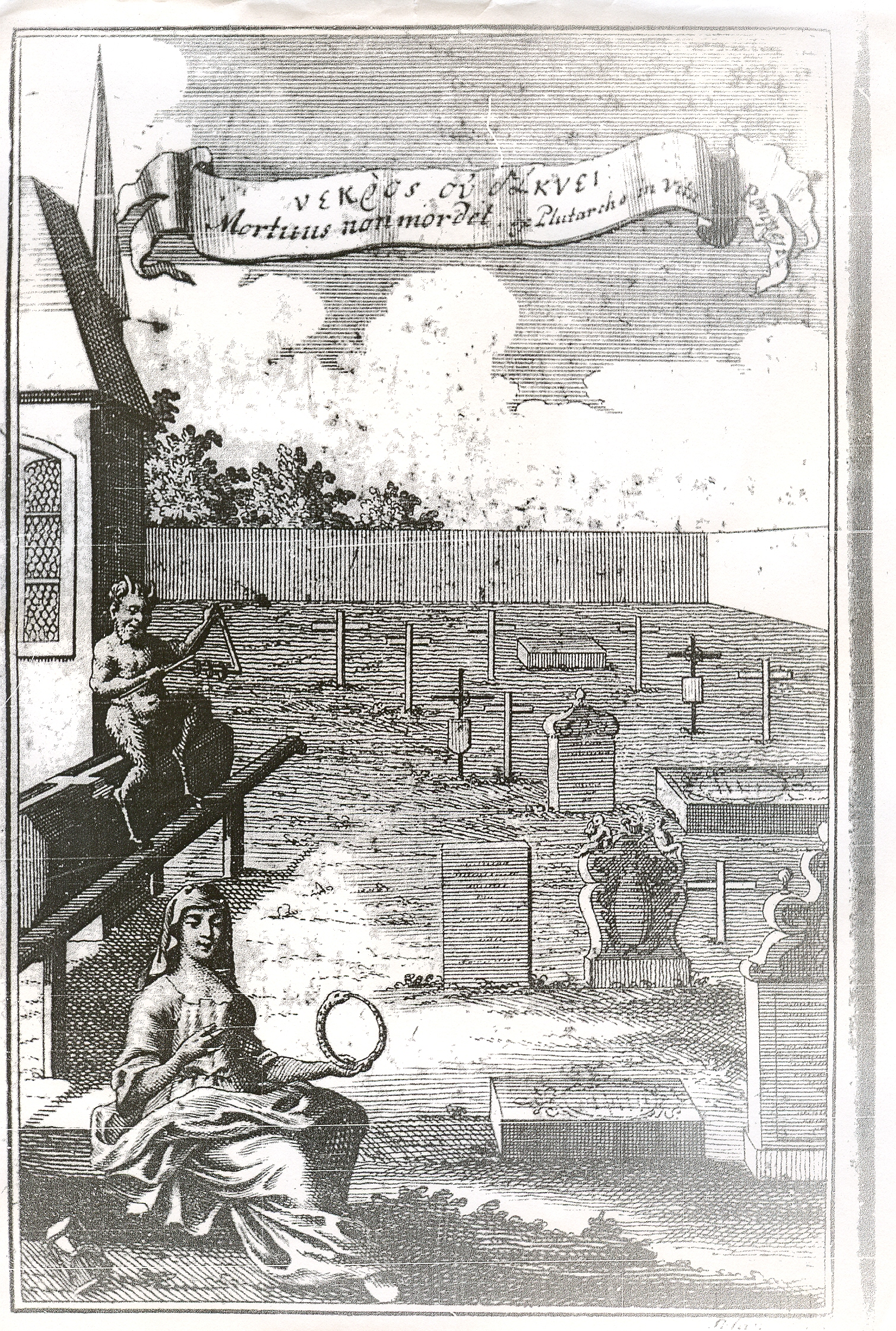
An engraving of a woman holding an ouroboros in Michael Ranft's 1734 treatise on vampires

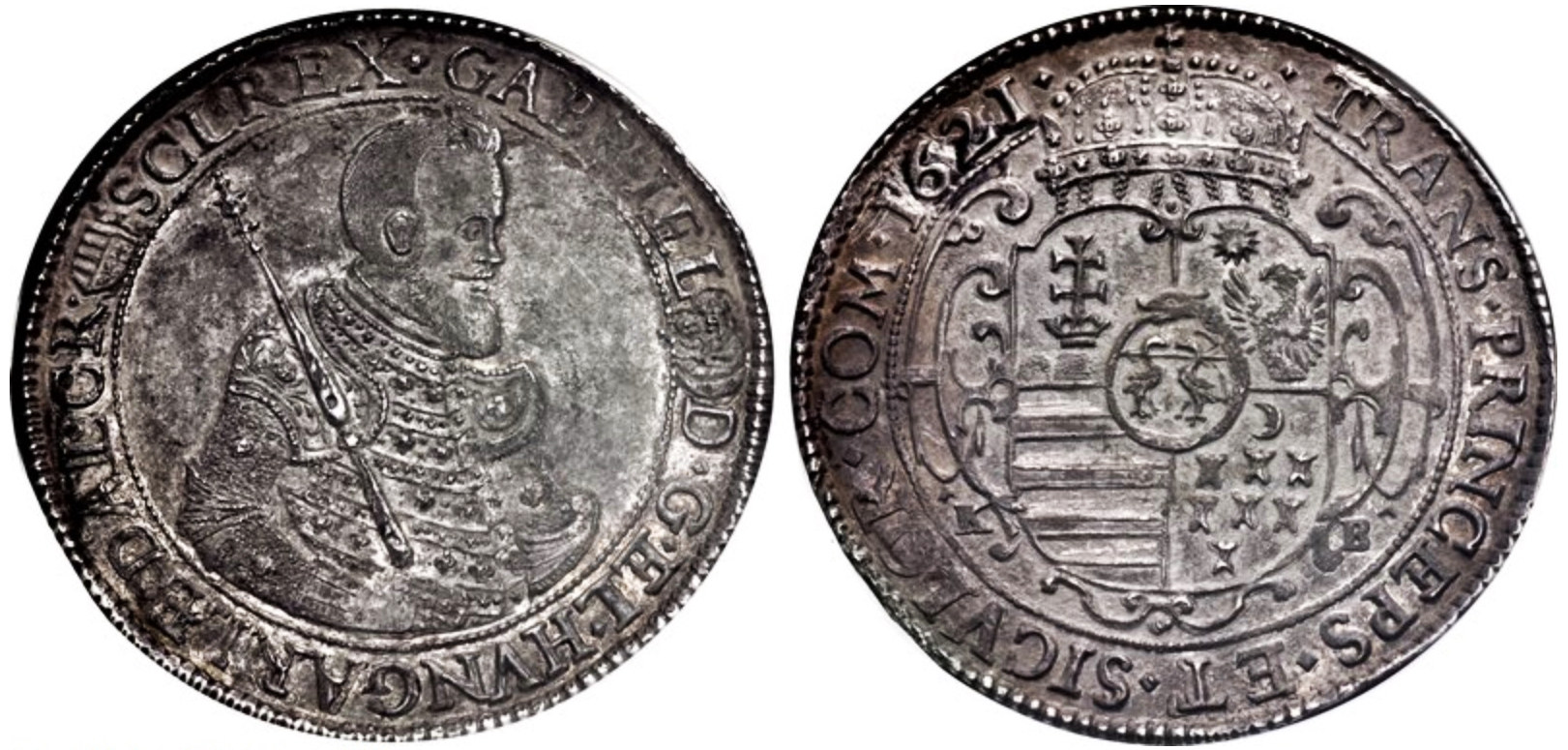
Transylvanian Thaler of Gabriel Bethlen showing his portrait and coat of arms including an ouroboros in the centre of the shield (1621)

Seal of the Theosophical Society, founded 1875

Flag of the short-lived Italian Regency of Carnaro at Fiume, bearing the snake Ouroborus

=== World serpent in mythology ===
In Norse mythology, the ouroboros appears as the serpent Jörmungandr, one of the three children of Loki and Angrboda, which grew so large that it could encircle the world and grasp its tail in its teeth. In the legends of Ragnar Lodbrok, such as Ragnarssona þáttr, the Geatish king Herraud gives a small lindworm as a gift to his daughter Þóra Town-Hart after which it grows into a large serpent which encircles the girl's bower and bites itself in the tail. The serpent is slain by Ragnar Lodbrok who marries Þóra. Ragnar later has a son with another woman named Kráka and this son is born with the image of a white snake in one eye. This snake encircled the iris and bit itself in the tail, and the son was named Sigurd Snake-in-the-Eye.

It is a common belief among indigenous people of the tropical lowlands of South America that waters at the edge of the world-disc are encircled by a snake, often an anaconda, biting its own tail.

The ouroboros has certain features in common with the Biblical Leviathan. According to the Zohar, the Leviathan is a singular creature with no mate, "its tail is placed in its mouth", while Rashi on Baba Batra 74b describes it as "twisting around and encompassing the entire world". The identification appears to go back as far as the poems of Kalir in the 6th–7th centuries.

=== Connection to Indian thought ===
In the Aitareya Brahmana, a Vedic text of the early 1st millennium BCE, the nature of the Vedic rituals is compared to "a snake biting its own tail."

Ouroboros symbolism has been used to describe the Kundalini. According to the medieval Yoga-kundalini Upanishad: "The divine power, Kundalini, shines like the stem of a young lotus; like a snake, coiled round upon herself she holds her tail in her mouth and lies resting half asleep as the base of the body" (1.82).

Storl (2004) also refers to the ouroboros image in reference to the "cycle of samsara".

== Modern references ==
=== Jungian psychology ===
Swiss psychiatrist Carl Jung saw the ouroboros as an archetype and the basic mandala of alchemy. Jung also defined the relationship of the ouroboros to alchemy: Carl Jung, Collected Works, Vol. 14 para. 513.

The alchemists, who in their own way knew more about the nature of the individuation process than we moderns do, expressed this paradox through the symbol of the Ouroboros, the snake that eats its own tail. The Ouroboros has been said to have a meaning of infinity or wholeness. In the age-old image of the Ouroboros lies the thought of devouring oneself and turning oneself into a circulatory process, for it was clear to the more astute alchemists that the prima materia of the art was man himself. The Ouroboros is a dramatic symbol for the integration and assimilation of the opposite, i.e. of the shadow. This 'feedback' process is at the same time a symbol of immortality since it is said of the Ouroboros that he slays himself and brings himself to life, fertilizes himself, and gives birth to himself. He symbolizes the One, who proceeds from the clash of opposites, and he, therefore, constitutes the secret of the prima materia which ... unquestionably stems from man's unconscious.

The Jungian psychologist Erich Neumann writes of it as a representation of the pre-ego "dawn state", depicting the undifferentiated infancy experience of both humankind and the individual child.

=== Kekulé and benzene ===
The ouroboros, Kekulé's inspiration for the structure of benzene

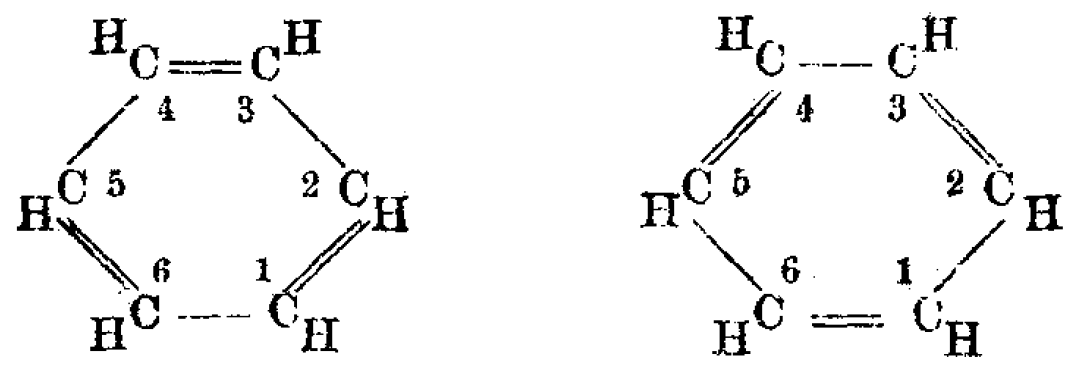
Kekulé's proposal for the structure of benzene (1872)

The German organic chemist August Kekulé described the eureka moment when he realised the structure of benzene, after he saw a vision of Ouroboros:

I was sitting, writing at my text-book; but the work did not progress; my thoughts were elsewhere. I turned my chair to the fire and dozed. Again the atoms were gamboling before my eyes. This time the smaller groups kept modestly in the background. My mental eye, rendered more acute by the repeated visions of the kind, could now distinguish larger structures of manifold conformation: long rows, sometimes more closely fitted together; all twining and twisting in snake-like motion. But look! What was that? One of the snakes had seized hold of its own tail, and the form whirled mockingly before my eyes. As if by a flash of lightning I awoke; and this time also I spent the rest of the night in working out the consequences of the hypothesis.

=== Cosmos ===
Martin Rees used the ouroboros to illustrate the various scales of the universe, ranging from 10^{−20} cm (subatomic) at the tail, up to 10^{25} cm (supragalactic) at the head. Rees stressed "the intimate links between the microworld and the cosmos, symbolised by the ouraborus", as tail and head meet to complete the circle.

=== Cybernetics ===
W. Ross Ashby applied ideas from biology to his own work as a psychiatrist in "Design for a Brain" (1952): that living things maintain essential variables of the body within critical limits with the brain as a regulator of the necessary feedback loops. Parmar contextualises his practices as an artist in applying the cybernetic Ouroboros principle to musical improvisation.

Hence the snake eating its tail is an accepted image or metaphor in the autopoietic calculus for self-reference, or self-indication, the logical processual notation for analysing and explaining self-producing autonomous systems and "the riddle of the living", developed by Francisco Varela. Reichel describes this as:

an abstract concept of a system whose structure is maintained through the self-production of and through that structure. In the words of Kauffman, is "the ancient mythological symbol of the worm ouroboros embedded in a mathematical, non-numerical calculus".

The calculus derives from the confluence of the cybernetic logic of feedback, the sub-disciplines of autopoiesis developed by Varela and Humberto Maturana, and calculus of indications of George Spencer Brown. In another related biological application:

It is remarkable, that Rosen's insight, that metabolism is just a mapping ..., which may be too cursory for a biologist, turns out to show us the way to construct recursively, by a limiting process, solutions of the self-referential Ouroborus equation f(f) = f, for an unknown function f, a way that mathematicians had not imagined before Rosen.

Second-order cybernetics, or the cybernetics of cybernetics, applies the principle of self-referentiality, or the participation of the observer in the observed, to explore observer involvement. including D. J. Stewart's domain of "observer valued imparities".

=== Armadillo girdled lizard ===
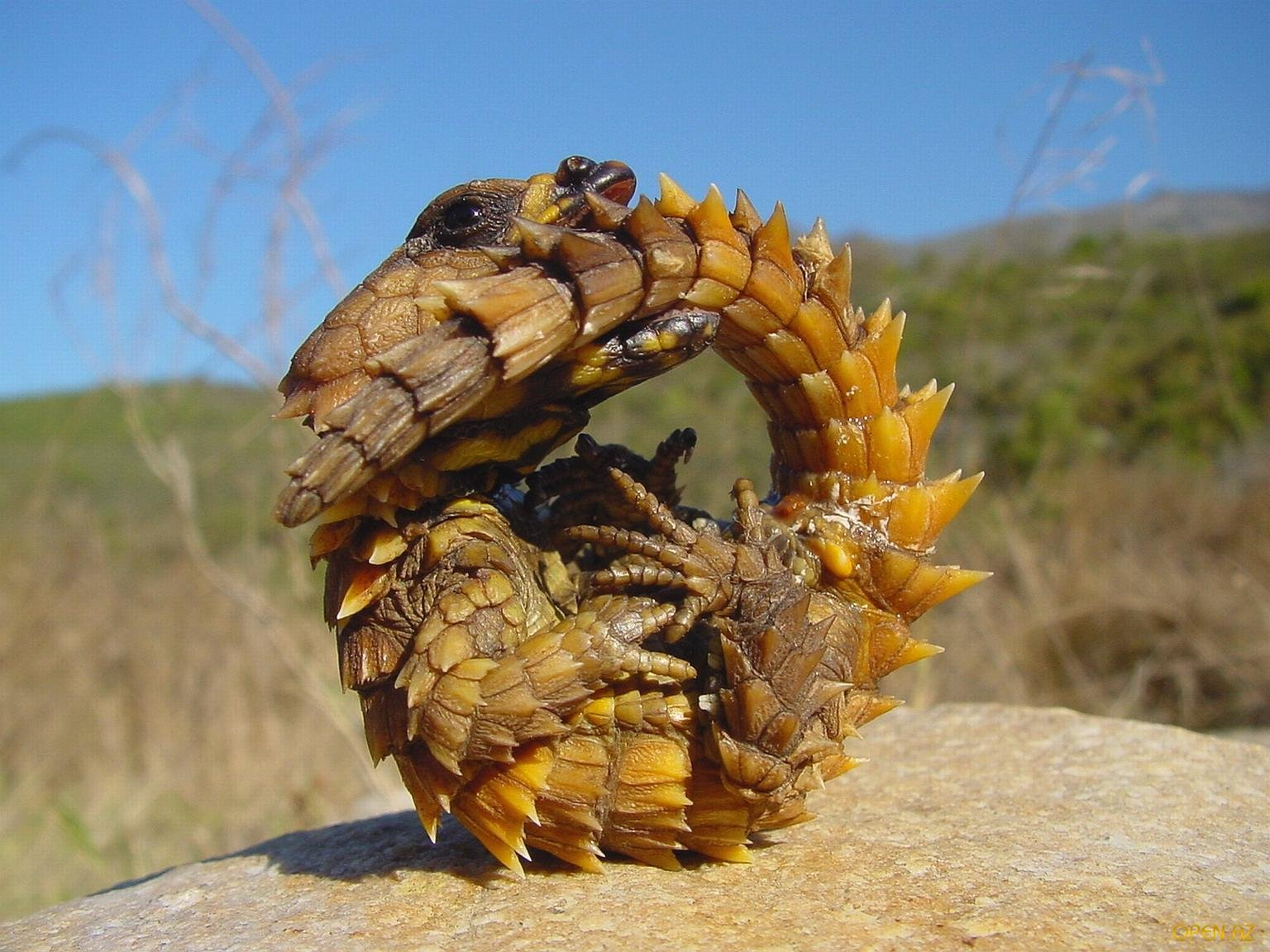
In its defensive position, the armadillo girdled lizard resembles an Ouroboros.

The scientific name of the armadillo girdled lizard (Ouroborus cataphractus) is derived from the animal's defensive posture: curling into a ball and holding its tail in its mouth.

=== In Iberian culture ===
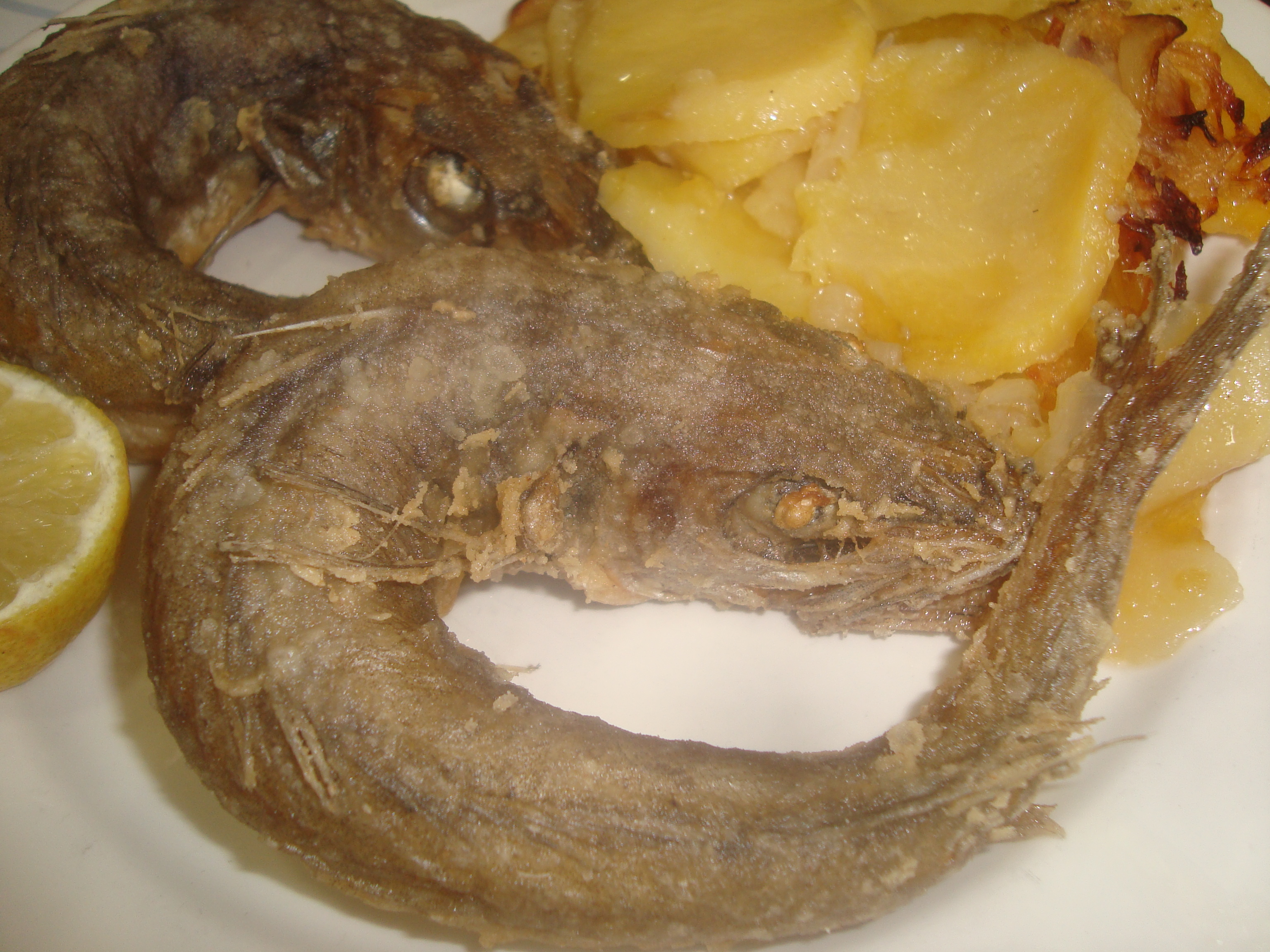
Pescadillas are often presented biting their tails.

A medium-sized European hake, known in Spanish as pescadilla and in Portuguese as pescada, is often presented with its mouth biting its tail. In Spanish it receives the name of pescadilla de rosca ("torus hake"). Both expressions Uma pescadinha de rabo na boca "tail-in mouth little hake" and La pescadilla que se muerde la cola, "the hake that bites its tail", are proverbial Portuguese and Spanish expressions for circular reasoning and vicious circles.

=== Dragon Gate Pro-Wrestling ===
The Kobe, Japan-based Dragon Gate Pro-Wrestling promotion used a stylised ouroboros as their logo for the first 20 years of the company's existence. The logo is a silhouetted dragon twisted into the shape of an infinity symbol, devouring its own tail. In 2019, the promotion dropped the infinity dragon logo in favour of a shield logo.

=== In fiction ===
==== Literature ====
A variation of the Ouroboros motif is an important symbol in the fantasy novel The Neverending Story by Michael Ende: featuring two snakes, one black and one white, biting the other's tail, this symbol represents the powerful AURYN and the infinite nature of the story. The symbol is also featured prominently on the cover of both the fictional book and the novel.

The Worm Ouroboros is a high-fantasy novel written by E. R. Eddison. Much like the cyclical symbol of the ouroboros eating its own tail, the novel ends as it begins. The main villain has a ring in the form of Ouroboros.

In Mexican Gothic the symbol is used throughout the story, portraying the immortality of the home and the family, as well as the persistence of outdated ideologies.

In The Wheel of Time and its 2021 television adaption, the Aes Sedai wear a "Great Serpent" ring, described as a snake consuming its own tail.

In the science fiction short story "All You Zombies" (1958) by American writer Robert A. Heinlein, the narrator wears an Ouroboros ring, "the worm Ouroboros, the world snake". The short story later inspired the movie Predestination (2014).

In the SCP Foundation universe, the proposal tale "The Ouroboros Cycle" spans the story of the SCP Foundation from its creation to its ending.

In the A Discovery of Witches novels and television adaptation, the crest of the de Clermont family is an ouroboros. The symbol plays a significant role in the alchemical plot of the story.

In the book series The Witcher by Andrzej Sapkowski, the Ouroboros and the "snake biting its own tail" is a recurring theme.

The protagonist of The First Fifteen Lives of Harry August by Claire North (Catherine Webb) is part of a group of people called the Ouroborans or Kalachakras: when they die they are born again in the same circumstances, with the knowledge of their previous lives.

In Jeff Smith's Bone comic book series, Mim, the dragon queen and creator of the valley, maintains balance in the world by revolving around the globe, tail in mouth, until being corrupted by the Lord of the Locusts.

==== Film and television ====
The Ouroboros is the adopted symbol of the End Times-obsessed Millennium Group in the TV series Millennium (1996−9). It also briefly appears when Dana Scully gets a tattoo of it in The X-Files Season 4 episode "Never Again" (1997). "Ouroboros" (1997) is an episode of the British science-fiction sitcom Red Dwarf, in which Dave Lister learns that he is his own father through time travel.

Season 2 episode 6 (2016) of Fear the Walking Dead is entitled "Ouroboros". The character of Alpha in The Walking Dead wears an ouroboros belt buckle. In Season 1 (2018) of the cyberpunk Netflix series Altered Carbon, the protagonist Takeshi Kovacs gets an ouroboros tattoo in shape of an infinity symbol, and it features in the show's title sequence, tying in to the themes of rebirth and the twisting of the natural cycle of life and death. Season 4 (2021) of The Sinner features it throughout.

In the season 2 premiere of the television series Loki, a character named Ouroboros (played by Ke Huy Quan) is introduced. He is an employee of the Time Variance Authority. In the fourth episode, he also references a snake biting its own tail.

In the anime Fullmetal Alchemist: Brotherhood, members of the homunculi race are identified by having the symbol carved/tattooed/branded/marked on them.

==== Gaming ====
Splatoon 3 has a serpent-like Salmonid creature named the Horrorboros.

In Xenoblade Chronicles 3, the main six characters wield a power named after the ouroboros, which is used to oppose the cycle of death and rebirth in Aionios rather than representing it.

The Trails series has a recurring society of antagonists called Ouroboros, whose emblem includes a snake biting its own tail.

==== Sculpture ====
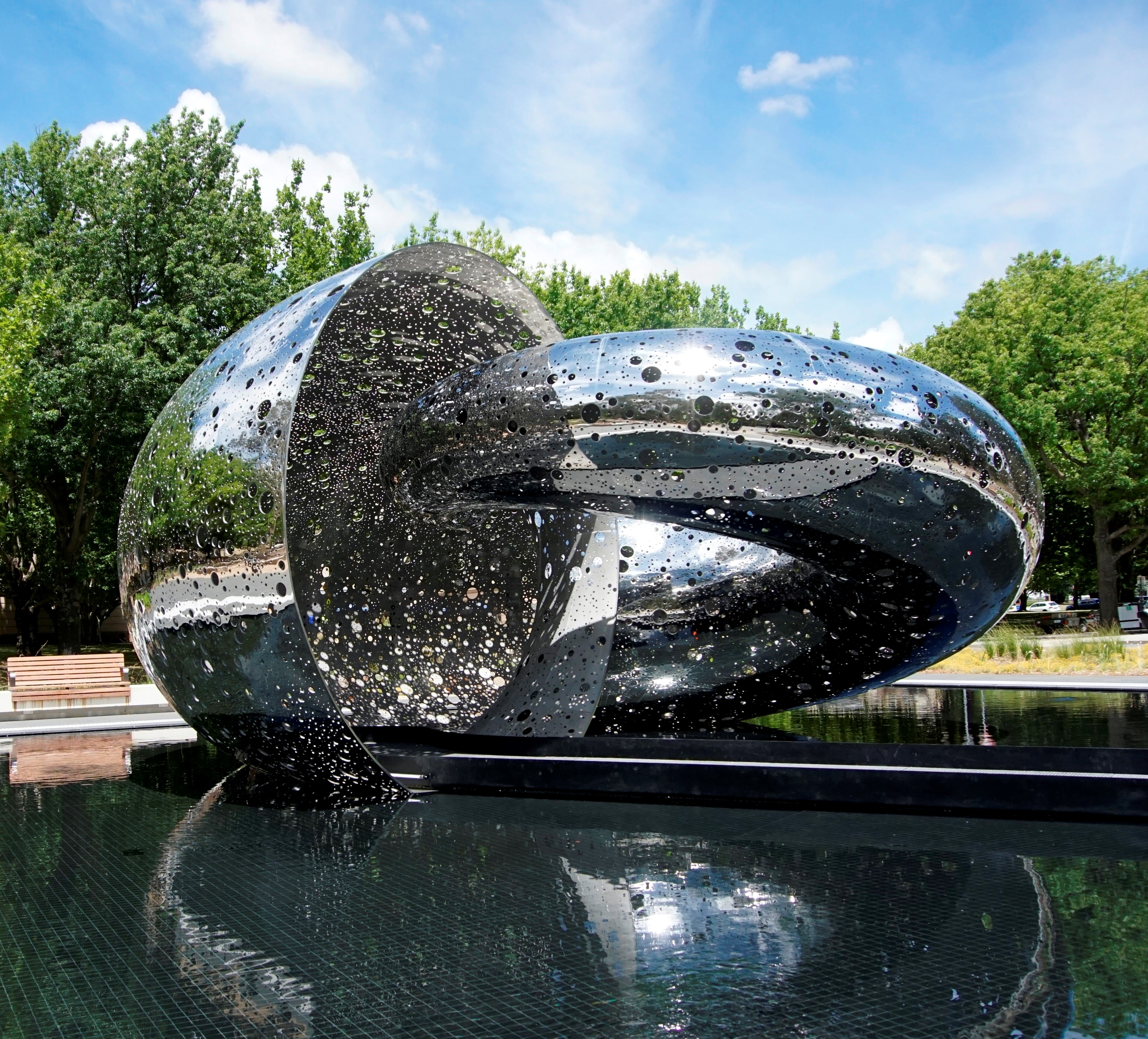
Ouroboros, Canberra

Ouroboros, a large public sculpture by Australian artist Lindy Lee at the National Gallery of Australia forecourt. Members of the public are free to enter its 4 m "mouth".

== See also ==
- Amphisbaena
- Autocannibalism
- Cyclic model
- Dragon (M. C. Escher)
- Endless knot
- Ensō
- Eternal return (Eliade)
- Eternalism (philosophy of time)
- Historic recurrence
- Hoop snake
- Infinite loop
- Kulshedra
- Möbius strip
- Quine (computing)
- Self-fulfilling prophecy
- Self-licking ice cream cone
- Self-reference
- Social cycle theory
- Strange loop
- Three hares
- Valknut
- The Worm Ouroboros
