= Dragon Prince and Dragon Star trilogies =

Fantasy novel trilogies by Melanie Rawn

The Dragon Prince and Dragon Star trilogies comprise six connected fantasy novels written by Melanie Rawn. The Dragon Prince trilogy focuses on Prince Rohan of the Desert and his Sunrunner wife, Sioned, while the Dragon Star trilogy focuses on their son, Pol. The Dragon Prince trilogy consists of novels Dragon Prince, The Star Scroll, and Sunrunner's Fire. The books in the Dragon Star trilogy are Stronghold, The Dragon Token, and Skybowl.

== Introduction ==
The Dragon Prince novels take place in a world of political intrigue, Sunrunners, Sorcerers, war, and dragons.

This world is known as the Continent. It is divided into thirteen Princedoms (Desert, Princemarch, Cunaxa, Dorval, Syr, Gilad, Ossetia, Meadowlord, Grib, Kierst, Isel, Fessenden, and Firon) all of which follow the rule of the High Prince, whose seat is Princemarch. During the Rialla the Princes gather to make new laws and alliances. The princedoms and titles usually pass down to the oldest son; however, women have acted as regents and have ruled their own Keeps.

Separate from any princedom is Goddess Keep, the home of the Sunrunners, or faradh'im, who are governed by the Lord or Lady of Goddess Keep. Sunrunners each have a unique pattern of colors – described by the jewels associated with the color – which they weave into the light.

Sorcerers, or diarmadhi, were thought to be extinct for many years. They were the old rulers of the world and of the Mérida – a race of assassins. Sorcerers use the starlight in addition to the moon and sun.

Dragons are the rulers of the sky. They live primarily in the Desert and Princemarch. These beasts are feared by most people of the Continent, but have a special connection to the Desertborn, who can sense when they are near.

=== Dragon Prince trilogy ===
- Dragon Prince
- The Star Scroll
- Sunrunner's Fire

This trilogy follows the life of Prince Rohan of the Desert as he tries to make his dreams of peace a reality.

The first book deals with Rohan's rise to power and how he deals with the Continental politics in a world where treaties are meant to be broken and High Prince Roelstra feasts on the greed and weakness of the other Princes. Throughout all of this, the Lady of Goddess Keep's plans for a Sunrunner Prince come ever closer to fruition as Rohan falls in love with the Sunrunner Sioned.

The second book takes place fourteen years later. Peace has reigned longer than ever in recent memory. New laws and treaties have been established; the Continent is slowly becoming a more civilized place. Then a threat rises: a young man claims to be High Prince Roelstra's heir. As Rohan walks the careful line between new civility and traditional barbarism, his son's claim on the throne of Princemarch must be defended.

The third book of the trilogy spans a good number of years, most of which are peaceful. Here, the deepest of Rohan's secrets must be revealed to his son, Pol, who is now a man grown. As the demons of the past grow more powerful and new, familial enemies arise, Rohan must maintain the peaceful order he has established throughout his world while watching his son and heir fight a battle that could cost him more than his life.

=== Dragon Star trilogy ===
- Stronghold
- The Dragon Token
- Skybowl

This trilogy tells the story of the Vellanti War and Pol's struggle to be his own man and his own Prince.

In the first book of the trilogy, the Vellant'im invade. It is unexpected and extremely brutal. They overtake nearly every princedom before the Princes can react. Only the Lord of Goddess Keep had any warning, but even he was too late to act. As the Vellant'im surge across the Continent their destination appears to be the Desert. Rohan and Pol struggle to repel the enemy while also leading their people and families to safety. Throughout this book the differences between Rohan and Pol become obvious, and clashes between the two abound.

In the next book of the trilogy, the Vellant'im have nearly conquered the Desert. Pol gathers his forces and what allies he can in order to resist the newly strengthened onslaught of the Vellant'im. As he struggles to repel the enemy, he also learns more about his ancestors, the ancient diarmadh'im. Pol realizes that he must look not only to his sword, but to sorcery in order to defeat the enemy.

In the final book of the trilogy, Pol stands to lose everything – his family, his land, his people, his very life. As the Vellanti War progresses, Pol must choose between his morals and sorcery, his pride and his people, and he must finally completely accept who and what he is: man, Prince, faradhi, and diarmadhi. Only if Pol comes into his own and unites the peoples of the Continent will he and his people have a chance at survival.

== Characters ==
=== Main ===
- Prince Rohan, the Dragon Prince, Prince of the Desert
- Sioned, the Sunrunner witch, Rohan's wife
- Pol, Rohan's son and heir

=== Major ===
- Tobin, Rohan's sister
- Chaynal, Rohan's brother-by-marriage and Battle Commander
- Maarken, Pol's cousin and Battle Commander
- Andry, Pol's cousin and rival
- Ostvel, Sioned's old friend and trusted ally

=== Other ===
- Lords of Radzyn Keep, Tobin and Chay's family
- Roelstra's Line, High Prince Roelstra, his daughters, his grandchildren, and his great-grandchildren
- Lords of River Run, Davvi (Sioned's brother) and his children
- Sunrunners of Goddess Keep
- Sorcerers of the Old Blood

== Continent ==
- Goddess Keep: Color: white, home of the Sunrunners

=== Princedoms ===
- Cunaxa: A northern princedom, where nothing really grows except the Merida's hatred and envy of the Desert. Known for its steel.
- The Desert: This is Prince Rohan's land. It is rich in dragons and gold and is the primary setting of the series.
- Dorval: A peaceful island princedom, where the Star Scrolls were found.
- Fessenden: A western princedom often at odds with the High Prince.
- Firon: The northernmost princedom, it is very mountainous and very cold. Diarmadh'im hide in these mountains.
- Gilad: The southernmost princedom, it is where the School of Physicians is located.
- Grib: An eastern princedom often at odds with the High Prince.
- Kierst/Isel: Kierst and Isel are two Princedoms that shared an island, but were great rivals and often on the brink of war. Under Prince Arlis's rule they unite and become the Princedom of Kierst-Isel.
- Meadowlord: The center most princedom, which traditionally hosted the Rialla.
- Ossetia: A southern princedom lush with rivers, trees, and farmlands. Goddess Keep is located here, but is not part of the princedom.
- Princemarch: A central princedom, it is the seat of the High Prince.
- Syr: A southern land famous for producing the best wines.

=== Other peoples ===
- Faradh'im: Sunrunners, can communicate and cast spells using the sunlight and moonlight
- Merida: Color: brown/yellow, assassins whose signature weapon is a poisoned glass blade
- Diarmadh'im: Sorcerers, use the starlight to commune and cast spells
- Isulk'im: Desert Tribesmen
- Vellant'im: Swordborn or Sword-Mountain, these are the invaders in the Dragon Star trilogy; they are not from the Continent

=== Religion ===
There are three gods worshipped by the peoples of the Continent: the Goddess, the Storm God, and the Nameless One. The Goddess is their primary deity; she created all life and is the patron god of the faradh'im. The peoples of the Continent have an easy, laid back relationship with their Goddess. She is benevolent and loving, a comforting figure with whom anyone can commune. The Storm God is the Goddess' consort. He has the reign of the seas, so he is worshiped more on the island princedoms. He is also the most warlike deity and the primary god of the Vellant'im. The Nameless One is the patron deity of the diarmadh'im. He is associated with the stars, but other than that very little is known about him.

In addition to the three main gods were Fire, Air, Earth, and Water, the elements from which all was made. Long ago the Goddess taught the first Sunrunners to weave light with Fire. Fire made deals with her brothers, Air and Earth, to ensure the Sunrunners safe passage with their domains. Water, Fire's sister and rival, did everything she could to hinder the Sunrunners, making their weavings impossible while travelling over her and generally making any Sunrunner on water miserably ill. Earth cared not about the faradh'im and focused on the concerns of the land. Air usually blew calmly for the Sunrunners, but occasionally would help his sister, Water, in causing them turmoil.

=== Dranath ===
Dranath is a fictional herb, grown only in the Veresch Mountains of Princemarch, the herb has several properties. When boiled, dried, and powdered, dranath can enhance the powers of a Sunrunner or sorcerer, while also helping Sunrunners cross water without illness. In this form the drug is very addicting; withdrawal will almost certainly kill the imbiber. Dranath can also cure the disease known as "The Plague", a malady which affects both humans and dragons. For non-gifted people this drug works as a hallucinogen.

Addiction is the strongest and most dangerous side-effect of dranath. As more of the drug is used, more of the drug is needed to satisfy the craving. Abstinance from the drug causes headaches, a swelling tongue, shaking limbs, aversion to brightness, and a chill as well as an overall ache and fatigue. In extreme cases of fighting the addiction, the victim is nearly insensible. Severe withdrawal causes unconsciousness, memory lapses, vivid and sexually explicit dreams, an itching sensation inside and out, vomiting, cramps, sweating, a foul smell, and deep, gut-twisting agony. The pain of withdrawal in these cases can drive the victim to injure themself in the attempt to get more dranath or to escape the pain. If tied down, the victim's flailing might pull their arms from their sockets. They might also bite their tongue off. The culmination of all the withdrawal effects eventually weakens the body to the point of total exhaustion. At this point the heart may give out; if it does, then unless the heart restarts (often by CPR) and the victim is able to breathe, they will die at long last.

Too much of the drug can kill a victim just as easily as withdrawal. The imbiber feels as if they are drowning, are unable to breathe, and become overwhelmed by the drug.

=== Rialla ===
The Rialla is a gathering of Lords and Princes, which takes place every three years. The High Prince oversees the Rialla along with the Lady or Lord of Goddess Keep. The Princes meet to establish laws, make treaties, and to trade. Lords often knight their charges and also marry. In addition to the political maneuverings, the Rialla is also a five-day fair. Merchants from all over the Continent come to trade, including horse breeders. There are great races at the Rialla which everyone attends no matter one's rank. Traditionally the Rialla was held near Waes of Meadowlord, but has been moved to Dragon's Rest in Princemarch.

- Day One: The gathering officially opens with the arrival of the High Prince. It is the main fair day and during it everyone is treated as equal rank insofar as walking the grounds.
- Day Two: The Princes meet individually with the High Prince as the Lords meet in the Athr'im Council, which is held separately.
- Day Three: Race day. There are about ten races, during which much betting and gambling ensues. Most races take place on the track, but one is cross country and very hazardous. Gold used to be the prize for these races, but in 698 gems were awarded at the suggestion of Princess Ianthe. This increased the jewelers' trade significantly and brought back the bejeweled style for Ladies.
- Day Four: The final day of political maneuverings, it is filled with Princely conferences, during which each meets with the High Prince.
- Day Five: The last day of the fair, it is when all official documents are signed and stamped by the Lady or Lord of Goddess Keep. The Lastday Ceremonies and weddings are also performed.

== Old Tongue ==
The Old Tongue is the language which was spoken in ancient times when the diarmadh'im ruled. Certain peoples still speak the language, such as the Desert Tribes and the mountainous people of Firon. Many of the terms or titles are still in use or resemble modern words.

== Merida ==
The Merida are a fictional people of assassins renowned for their silence and skill. They are a people without a home, without a Princedom or any known permanent Keep, though they currently hide within the borders of Cunaxa. Their colors are yellow and brown. If they have a banner it is not known to those not Merida. They have a hierarchy and nobles, the royals of which are called the Merida Blood. Those of the Blood bear a ritual chin scar to signify their station.

Much of the culture of the Merida – outside of the training of assassins – remains a mystery.

In the Old Tongue Merida means 'Gentle Glass.' This name is because these assassins' chosen weapon – and calling card – is a glass knife, which is also filled with poison. The green-glass blade is notched and shatters as it enters a body, poisoning the victim as well as making it impossible to remove the blade. If stabbed by a Merida knife there is no hope of survival. This makes the Merida very formidable assassins.
