= Sunrunner's Fire =

1990 novel by Melanie Rawn

- Author: Melanie Rawn
- Cover artist: Michael Whelan
- Language: English
- Series: Dragon Prince and Dragon Star trilogies
- Genre: Fantasy
- Publisher: DAW Books
- Publication date: 1990
- Publication place: United States
- Media type: Print (Hardcover & paperback)
- Pages: 320
- ISBN: 0-7564-0305-7
- Preceded by: The Star Scroll
- Followed by: Stronghold

Sunrunner's Fire is a fantasy novel by American author Melanie Rawn. It concludes the Dragon Prince trilogy.

== Plot summary ==
Part One: Andry, the new Lord of Goddess Keep, has visions of war and death. He sees the destruction of Radzyn, its proud towers ablaze. To prevent his visions, he reworks the teachings and rituals of Goddess Keep based on the findings of the Star Scroll. He also trains Sunrunners in sorcery. Meanwhile, true sorcerers ready themselves to challenge Pol's right to Princemarch. Ruval, Ianthe's oldest, undisputed son, prepared for the challenge by learning sorcery, while Marron infiltrates Chiana of Meadowlord's personal guards. When he gets close enough, he allows Mireva to enter Chiana's chamber and enspell the Princess with a mirror. Chiana then begins to amass an army, which will invade Princemarch.

Part Two: Year 728: Pol, now Ruling Prince of Princemarch, seeks to become the man and Prince that his parents, High Prince Rohan and High Princess Sioned raised him to be, but his spirit is impatient and restless. When word comes that dragons are being hunted, Pol follows Riyan and Sorin to Elktrap Manor. They find a dying dragon nearby, who shows them that men had attacked it using sorcery. The attackers were Ruval and Marron, who had been trying to get Pol's attention. A battle ensues. Sorin is killed.

As the Desert mourns, Ruval enlists Prince Miyon of Cunaxa's aid in overthrowing Pol. He and Marron hide in Miyon's entourage as the Prince travels to Stronghold on business before the Rialla, while Mireva becomes a servant of Miyon's illegitimate daughter, Meiglan. Miyon plans to use Meiglan to ensnare Pol. Pol has been raised among strong, intelligent, independent women all his life, while Meiglan is an innocent, shy, easily terrified young girl. Miyon has abused Meiglan all her life, and thinks Pol will be smitten by her innocence and need for protection.

As Pol prepares for the challenge Ruval will make, he begins to fall for Meiglan despite his suspicions of her. Before Ruval can make his challenge, however, Marron challenges Pol himself for Feruche, their birthplace. Riyan, who had only moments ago had been made Lord of Feruche, accepts Marron's challenge of sorcery. As Marron forms his first spell, Andry turns it back on the sorcerer by using his knowledge of the Star Scroll. He kills Marron in retribution for Sorin's death. This act results in Andry's banishment from the Desert.

When Ruval's challenge finally comes, on starlight, Rohan realizes that Pol needs to be told the truth about birth: that Ianthe bore him and he was a diarmadhi. Pol is horrified and angry, but uses his newfound knowledge to study the sorcery in the scrolls. He and Ruval meet at Rivernrock and the rabikor begins. During the battle, Ruval tries to pull a dragon from the sky, but Pol bonds with it. The dragon, Azhdeen, kills Ruval, ending the threat to Pol's claim on Princemarch.
