= Twin Dragon =

Twin Dragon, twinned-dragons, Dragon twins, or variation, may refer to:

- Twin Dragons (1992 film; Chinese: 雙龍會; Jyutping: Seong1 Lung4 Wui2), Hong Kong action comedy
- twindragon (fractal), a mathematical fractal pattern
- Shadow Warrior: Twin Dragon (1998 videogame), a 1998 expansion pack for the 1997 game Shadow Warrior

== See also ==
- Dragon (disambiguation)
