= Melanie Rawn =

American author of fantasy literature (born 1954)

- Born: 1954 (age 71–72)
- Occupation: Novelist
- Writing career
- Genre: Epic fantasy
- Notable work: The Dragon Prince trilogy

Melanie Rawn (born 1954) is an American author of fantasy literature. She received a BA in history from Scripps College and worked as a teacher and editor before becoming a writer.

She has been nominated for a Locus award on three occasions: in 1989 for Dragon Prince in the first novel category, in 1994 for Skybowl in the fantasy novel category, and again in 1995 for Ruins of Ambrai in the fantasy novel category. The third novel in the "Exiles" trilogy has now been "forthcoming" since the late 1990s due to the author suffering from clinical depression and moving on to other projects to facilitate her recovery. In 2014, Rawn stated via Kate Elliot's blog that she intended to complete the trilogy after finishing the fifth book of the Glass Thorns series.

== Bibliography ==
=== Dragon Prince trilogy ===
- Dragon Prince, 1988
- The Star Scroll, 1989
- Sunrunner's Fire, 1990

=== Dragon Star trilogy ===
- Stronghold, 1991
- The Dragon Token, 1993
- Skybowl, 1994

=== The Golden Key universe ===
- The Golden Key, 1996 (with Kate Elliott and Jennifer Roberson)
- The Diviner, 2011 (prequel to The Golden Key)

=== Exiles trilogy ===
- The Ruins of Ambrai, 1994
- The Mageborn Traitor, 1997
- The Captal's Tower (planned)

=== Spellbinder ===
- Spellbinder: A Love Story with Magical Interruptions, 2006
- Fire Raiser, 2009

=== Glass Thorns ===
- Touchstone, 2012
- Elsewhens, 2013
- Thornlost, 2014
- Window Wall, 2015
- Playing to the Gods, 2017

=== Stand-alone ===
- The Rushden Legacy, 1985 (as Ellen Randolph)
- Knights of the Morningstar, 1994, Quantum Leap tie-in novel

=== Short stories ===
- Salve, Regina in Return to Avalon (Roberson; 1995 DAW)
- The Lady's Gift in Ancient Enchantresses (Massie-Ferch, Greenberg, Gilliam; 1995 DAW)
- Of the Death of Kings in Warrior Enchantresses (Maisse-Ferch, Greenberg; 1996 DAW)
- The Abbot of Croxton in Highwaymen: Robbers & Rogues (Roberson; 1997 DAW)
- There Goes the Neighborhood in Return of the Dinosaurs (Resnick, Greenberg; 1997 DAW)
- The Sacrifice in Fantasy: DAW 30th Anniversary (Gilbert, Wollheim; 2002 DAW)
- Mother of All Russiya in Lightspeed, May 2012 (Adams; 2012 Lightspeed Magazine)
