= Kate Elliott (writer) =

American writer, the pen name of Alis A. Rasmussen

Alis A. Rasmussen
- Born: 1958 (age 67–68)
- Occupation: Novelist
- Spouse: Jay Silverstein
- Writing career
- Pen name: Kate Elliott
- Period: 1980s–present
- Genres: Fantasy; science fiction

Kate Elliott is the pen name of American fantasy and science fiction writer Alis A. Rasmussen (born 1958).

== Career ==
Although Rasmussen's first four novels, including The Labyrinth Gate (1988) and The Highroad (1990), were not bestsellers, additional publishers liked her manuscripts. However, they wanted a fresh name unconnected with the sales figures of the previous books. Starting in 1992 under the new name of Kate Elliott, her sales improved.

Elliott published the first of her Jaran series in 1992, although she began the first draft in 1980. Heather Massey's review of Jaran describes it as "a science fiction romance classic," while Todd Richmond in an SF Site review calls the series "an epic masterpiece." The previously published Highroad trilogy (written as Alis Rasmussen) is set in the same universe as the Jaran books.

The 1996 collaboration between Elliott, Melanie Rawn, and Jennifer Roberson on The Golden Key was coordinated primarily via fax machine. It was a finalist for the World Fantasy Award—Novel.

Her book King's Dragon was a finalist for the 1997 Nebula Award for Best Novel.

Her 2015 book Court of Fives was shortlisted for the Andre Norton Award. Also in 2015, she released Black Wolves, the first book in a planned sequel trilogy to the Crossroads series. The publisher, Orbit Books, cancelled the series while Elliott was writing the second book.

In 2020, Elliott published Unconquerable Sun, the first novel in a gender-bending space opera trilogy based on Alexander the Great.

== Personal life ==
A native of Junction City, Oregon, Rasmussen moved to Oakland, California, to attend Mills College. There she became active in the Society for Creative Anachronism, where she pursued medieval sword fighting.

Rasmussen, lives with her husband, archeologist Jay Silverstein, and their three children in Hawaii.

== Selected bibliography ==
=== As Alis A. Rasmussen ===
- The Labyrinth Gate, Baen Books (1988), ISBN 0-671-69793-5
- The Highroad Trilogy
  1. A Passage of Stars, Bantam Spectra (1990), ISBN 0-553-28372-3
  2. Revolution's Shore, Bantam Spectra (1990), ISBN 0-553-28544-0
  3. The Price of Ransom, Bantam Spectra (1990), ISBN 0-553-28788-5

=== As Kate Elliott ===
- The Spiritwalker Trilogy
  - Cold Magic, Orbit Books (2010), ISBN 9781841498812
  - Cold Fire, Orbit Books (2011), ISBN 9781841498836
  - Cold Steel, Orbit Books (2013), ISBN 978-0316080903
- Crossroads series
  - Spirit Gate, Tor Books (2007), ISBN 9780765310552
  - Shadow Gate, Tor Books (2008), ISBN 9780765310569
  - Traitors' Gate, Tor Books (2009), ISBN 9780765310576
- Crown of Stars series
  - King's Dragon, DAW Books (1997), ISBN 978-0886777272
  - Prince of Dogs, DAW Books (1998), ISBN 978-0886777708
  - The Burning Stone, DAW Books (1999), ISBN 978-0886778132
  - Child of Flame, DAW Books (2000), ISBN 9780886778927
  - The Gathering Storm, DAW Books (2003), ISBN 978-0756401191
  - In the Ruins, DAW Books (2005), ISBN 978-0756401924
  - The Crown of Stars, DAW Books (2006), ISBN 9780756411930
- The Golden Key, DAW Books (in collaboration with Melanie Rawn and Jennifer Roberson, 1996), ISBN 9780886776916
- The Novels of the Jaran
  - Jaran, DAW Books (1992), ISBN 9780886775131
  - An Earthly Crown, DAW Books (1993), ISBN 9780886775469
  - His Conquering Sword, DAW Books (1993), ISBN 9780886775513
  - The Law of Becoming, DAW Books (1994), ISBN 9780886775803
- The Very Best of Kate Elliott, Tachyon Publications (2015), ISBN 978-1616961794
- Court of Fives series
  - Court of Fives, Little, Brown Books for Young Readers (2015), ISBN 978-0316364195
  - Poisoned Blade, Little, Brown Books for Young Readers (2016), ISBN 9780316344364
  - Buried Heart, Little, Brown Books for Young Readers (2017), ISBN 9780316344401
- Black Wolves series (sequel to the Crossroads series)
  - Black Wolves, Orbit Books (2015), ISBN 9780316368698
- Magic: The Gathering novels
  - Throne of Eldraine: The Wildered Quest, Wizards of the Coast (2019), ISBN 9780786967087
- The Sun Chronicles
  - Unconquerable Sun, Head of Zeus (2020), ISBN 978-1800243200
  - Furious Heaven, Head of Zeus (2023), ISBN 978-1800243248
  - Lady Chaos, Head of Zeus (2026), ISBN 9781800243286
- The Keeper's Six, Tordotcom (2023), ISBN 978-1250769077

=== Short stories ===
- "My Voice Is in My Sword" in Weird Tales from Shakespeare (1994), reprinted in Apex Magazine (2015)
- "The Memory of Peace" in Enchanted Forests (ed. Katharine Kerr, 1995)
- "A Simple Act of Kindness" in The Shimmering Door (eds. Martin H. Greenberg and Katharine Kerr, 1996)
- "With God to Guard Her" in Return to Avalon (ed. Jennifer Roberson, 1996)
- "The Gates of Joriun" in Tarot Fantastic (ed. Martin H. Greenberg and Lawrence Schimel, 1997)
- "Making the World Live Again" in Zodiac Fantastic (ed. Martin H. Greenberg and A. R. Morlan, 1997)
- "Sunseeker" in 30th Anniversary DAW Books Science Fiction (ed. Betsy Wollheim and Sheila E. Gilbert, 2002)
- "Riding the Shore of the River of Death" in A Fantasy Medley (ed. Yanni Kuznia, 2009), reprinted in Epic: Legends of Fantasy (ed. John Joseph Adams, 2012)
- "Leaf and Branch and Grass and Vine" in Fearsome Journeys (ed. Jonathan Strahan, 2013)
- "Everything In The World Wants Something" in Book Smugglers (2017)
- "A Compendium of Architecture and the Science of Building" in Lightspeed (2018)
- "The Tinder Box" at Tor.com (2021)
