= Parco Dragoni in Forlì =

Coordinates: 44°13′00″N 12°03′48″E

Parco Dragoni in Forlì. Roller rink.

Parco Dragoni is a green area in the frazione Ronco of Forlì, Emilia-Romagna, northern Italy.

The park is equipped with a small arena for outdoor performances, bicycle and keep-fit paths, a roller rink, a skatepark with several ramps, a children playing area, volley and basket courts and a soccer pitch.

At the entrance stands the local music hall that bands can rent to rehearse and record their music.
