= Stronghold (novel) =

1991 American fantasy novel

- Author: Melanie Rawn
- Cover artist: Michael Whelan
- Language: English
- Series: Dragon Prince and Dragon Star trilogies
- Genre: Fantasy
- Publisher: DAW Books
- Publication date: 1991
- Publication place: United States
- Media type: Print (Hardcover & paperback)
- Pages: 592
- ISBN: 0-88677-482-9
- OCLC: 24291499
- Preceded by: Sunrunner's Fire
- Followed by: The Dragon Token

Stronghold is a 1991 fantasy novel by American author Melanie Rawn. It is the first book of the Dragon Star trilogy.

== Plot summary ==
After the trials and tribulations faced with the High Prince and others, Rohan, Sioned, Pol and Andry along with the rest of their families and friends, must defend their land against a large army of barbarians. No one knows where this army comes from or why they are attacking the Continent - or focusing on the Desert, High Prince Rohan's beloved homeland.

Rohan and Pol are forced to flee across the Desert as they are pursued by the invaders. The Dorvali are forced to flee their island, but Ludhill, Prince Chadric's heir, and his wife stay on the island and form a resistance. Prince Kostas of Syr revels in leading his army and manages to secure his princedom. Rohannon defends Kierst after the death of Prince Volog, and manages to fend off the invaders by having the army pad their armor to look like women. Andry protects Goddess Keep by using a ros'alath, a sorcerous wall, which terrorizes and kills those who touch it.

As Rohan and Pol retreat across the Desert, they discover the enemy's fear of dragons. For a while the Desert forces are able to outsmart the enemy, but at the Battle of Stronghold the High Warlord arrives with his elite forces. The defenders of the Desert lose the battle, and High Prince Rohan dies as his beloved Stronghold burns.

== Reviews ==
A short review by Jackie Cassada in Library Journal recommends the novel, praising its "vivid" settings and "compelling" characterizations. A critical review by Sybil Steinberg in Publishers Weekly questions whether the book stands alone from the Dragon Prince series, and describes the opening as "slow and confusing".
