= Dragon Petroleum =

Welsh Petroleum Company

- Type: Fuel company
- Headquarters: Dyserth, Clwyd, Wales
- Products: Petrol; Diesel
- Services: Convenience stores; Carwashes; Automobile repair shops
- Parent: NWF Group
- Website: www.dragonpetroleum.co.uk

Dragon Petroleum is a Welsh fuel company with headquarters at Dyserth in Clwyd. It is a subsidiary of NWF Fuels, itself a trading Division of the NWF Group plc of Nantwich in Cheshire. Dragon Petroleum operates a chain of petrol stations and garages across Wales. Its corporate logo is a stylised Welsh dragon, and in its most recent rebranding this logo has been superimposed upon green and white stripes, so as to resemble (but not precisely reproduce) the Welsh flag. The parent company (NWF) also supplies fuel and associated products across England (from petroleum companies Texaco and Jet), but the Dragon Petroleum brand is restricted exclusively to Wales.

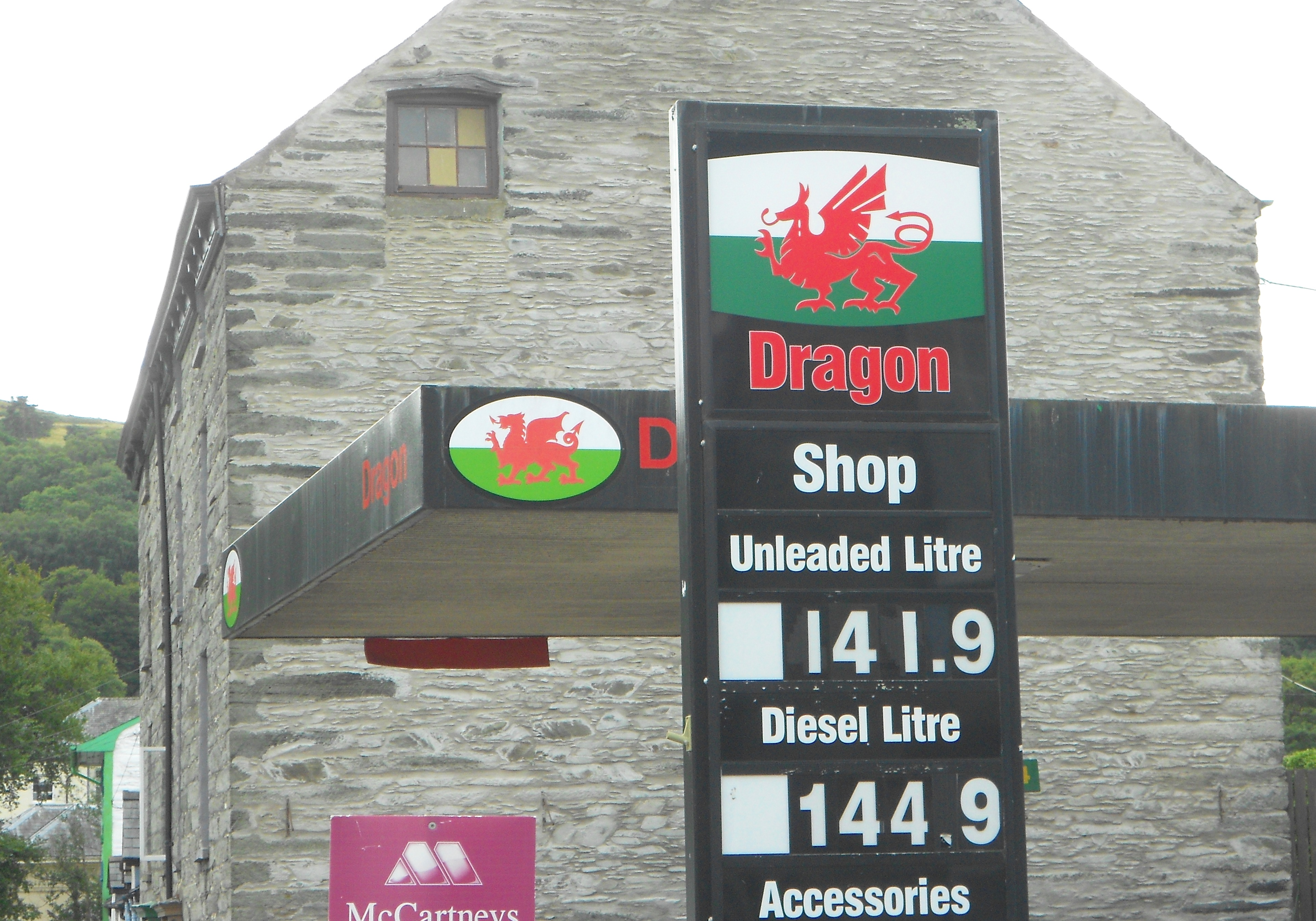
A Dragon petrol station in north Wales.
