= SMS Drache =

Several ships of the Prussian and Austrian/Austro-Hungarian Navies have been named SMS Drache (Dragon)

- SMS Drache (1861), an ironclad warship of the Austrian Navy
- SMS Drache (1865), a steam gunboat of the Prussian Navy
- SMS Drache (1907), a Kaiman-class torpedo boat of the Austro-Hungarian Navy
