= NWF Group =

British agricultural supplies company

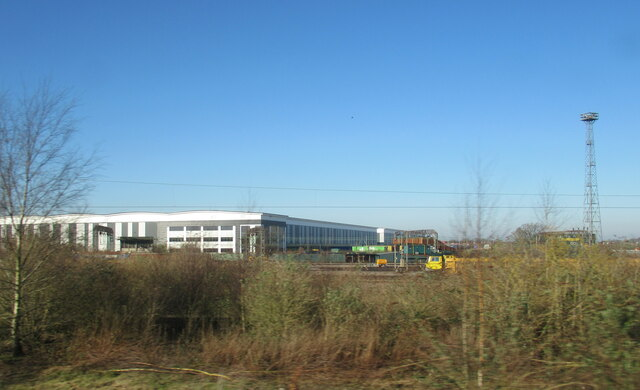
Premises in Cheshire, UK

NWF Group is a British logistics company that distributes fuels, farm supplies and foods. It is based in Wardle, near Nantwich in Cheshire.

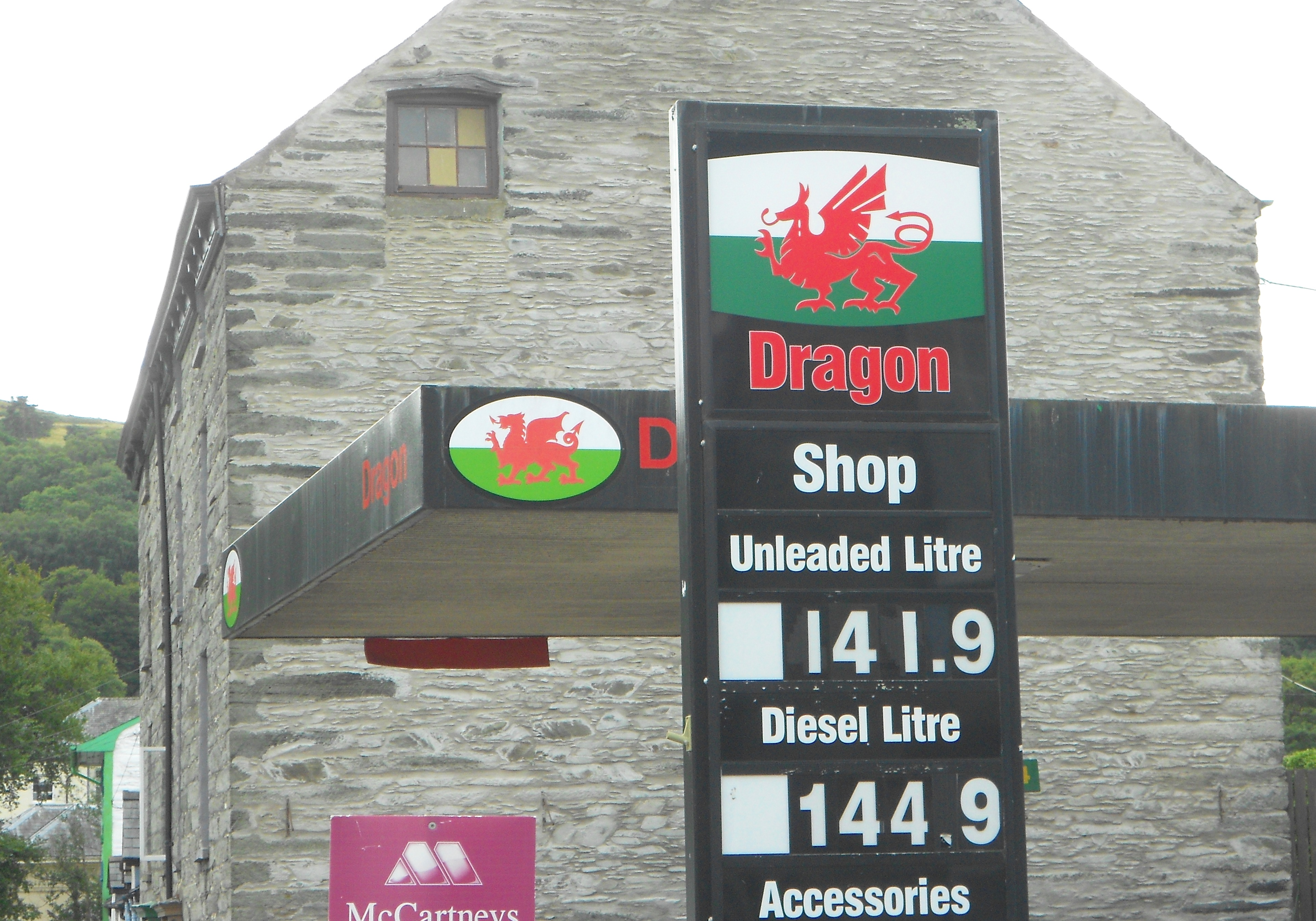
Dragon Petroleum petrol station in Wales

The company was established as the Cheshire Farmers Supply Association on 5 June 1871 and operated as an agricultural cooperative, later named North Western Farmers, before demutualising and becoming listed on the London Stock Exchange. It had 1529 employees in 2025.
