= Dragon (remote sensing) =

Dragon is a remote sensing image processing software package. This software provides capabilities for displaying, analyzing, and interpreting digital images from earth satellites and raster data files that represent spatially distributed data. All the Dragon packages are derived from the code created by Goldin-Rudahl.

- Open Dragon is free to educational users. It was intended to be free worldwide, as well as open source (hence the name) but due to funding problems, it is currently available only in Southeast Asia.
- Dragon Academic is functionally identical to Open Dragon.
- Dragon Professional is expanded to handle full-scene data sets from sensors such as Landsat TM, SPOT, and Aster.

== History ==
The initial version of Dragon was released in 1987 and ran on the MS-DOS operating system. Dragon was the first commercial remote sensing software package designed to use only the native capabilities of off-the-shelf personal computers. At the time Dragon was developed, other PC remote sensing products such as Erdas required expensive special purpose graphics devices. Dragon was intended to be used for education in geography, geology, forestry and other disciplines that use spatial information; thus it was very important to minimize the costs of required hardware. The first version of Dragon ran on a basic IBM-PC with two floppy disks and a four-color or gray-level graphics display. Alternatively, it could use any of several models of Japanese PC.

The MS-DOS phase of Dragon development focused on trying to squeeze functionality into very limited disk and memory space, and to get full-color image display using rapidly changing graphics hardware with no standardized drivers. The VESA display standard was a turning point in making full-color display functionality available in MS-DOS. This VESA/SVGA/MS-DOS version of Dragon can still be adapted for embedded systems use.

The move to Microsoft Windows 95/98 was painful because these operating systems did not provide true multitasking. Unfortunately this phase coincided with the publication of the well-known Gibson and Powers textbook (Gibson, 2000) which included a copy of the Windows 95 Dragon. With the advent of Windows NT and successors (Windows 2000, XP, Vista, etc.), it became possible to create a Windows version of Dragon that allowed simultaneous display of and interaction with multiple images.

In 2004, funding became available from Thailand to create a free educational version of the software which became known as OpenDragon. This project lasted for three years. The software is still available at no cost in Thailand, Laos, Cambodia and Vietnam (although it has only been translated into Thai).

After funding for OpenDragon was discontinued, Dragon Professional was developed to reach beyond the customary educational users. New personal computer capabilities, which by then extended to gigabytes of memory and hundreds of gigabytes of disk storage, all at low cost, made it possible to store and process the very large data sets produced by twenty-first-century high-resolution satellites.

Dragon Professional required major changes in the user interaction model, which previously had assumed a 1-to-1 relationship between the image on the screen and the sensor data. At the same time, image processing operations such as selection of ground control points require access to individual data elements (pixels) selected from the more than 30 million available in a typical full-scene image. Thus, the appearance and behavior of Dragon Professional are quite different from OpenDragon/Dragon Academic.

== The name ==
Asian dragons are considered symbolic of wisdom and knowledge, unlike the ferocious western dragons. Thus, the name Dragon/ips(r) or Dragon Image Processing System is intended to imply wisdom in the knowledge of and intelligent use of the world in which we live.

== The Software ==
Because the expected user is assumed to be relatively untrained, Dragon pays more attention to the user experience than to having a large selection of possibly obscure processing operations. Within the user interface, which has been translated into several languages, context-sensitive help explains every user choice, and reasonable defaults are provided where possible. The User Manual (English only) details all processing algorithms.

The software provides a fairly conventional set of remote sensing operations, which are intended to be those which a student of geography arguably ought to know. These include:

1. Single and multiband image display;
2. Filtering for image enhancement;
3. Band combinations such as sum and ratio;
4. Principal components analysis;
5. Image statistics and measurement;
6. A variety of supervised and unsupervised classification algorithms;
7. Registration and geometric correction;
8. Heads-up digitizing to capture vector data;
9. Some raster geographic information systems GIS operations such as slope, aspect, and buffer calculations;
10. Import from and export to various standard image file formats such as GeoTIFF.

In order to provide interoperability with other software packages, and to permit users to add their own custom processing operations, all important file formats are documented and an API called the Programmer's Toolkit is available.

== Problems ==
1. Dragon Academic and Dragon Professional use a USB dongle for copy protection. While this allows the license to permit unlimited copying, it is also sometimes inconvenient. Other protection methods are being considered.
2. Supervised and unsupervised classification operations in all versions of the software currently can process only four image bands at a time.
3. Dragon can measure length and area on any georeferenced image. However this assumes the image uses a distance-preserving projection. If the image uses latitude-longitude, the measurements will be incorrect in high latitudes.
4. The software runs only on Microsoft Windows, although three of its four components also build and run on Linux.
