= Makara (short story) =

Makara (Sinhala: මකරා) is a short story written in Sinhala by Sri Lankan writer Anandasiri Kalapugama. In 1975, this short story won the first prize of island-wide Novice Short Story Writing Competition conducted by Sri Lanka Board of Cultural Affairs under the Department of Cultural Affairs in the Government of Sri Lanka. It was published in 1975 special edition of “Art News” (Sinhala: කලා පුවත්) issued in line with 1975 Annual Literature Ceremony held in Galle and the winners were awarded by then President of Republic of Sri Lanka, Late Hon. William Gopallawa.

== Background ==
The story has been written few years after Sri Lankan young revolutionaries’ 1971 Uprising, a failed attempt to topple then regime. Therefore socialism has been the theme of the story.

== Plot ==
There are three characters – a farmer, his wife, and son. The farmer depends on a wealthy land owner's paddy fields he cultivates. At the end of each season, he gets a share of the harvest but not enough to continue living due to his dues to the landowner.

In common, it is believed that the dragon can swallow anyone or anything so the “Makara” symbolically portrays the rich in this story.
