= HMS Dragon =

Several ships of the Royal Navy have been named HMS Dragon.

- English ship Dragon (1512), a ship of 100 tons built in 1512 under Sir William Sidney in the war with France. Last mentioned 1514.
- English ship Dragon (1542), a 140-ton three-masted ship depicted in the Anthony Roll of 1546. Built 1542 or 1544 and rebuilt 1551. Last mentioned 1553
- English galleon Dragon (or Red Dragon), a galleon built in 1593 and last mentioned 1613.
- English ship Dragon (1647), a fourth-rate frigate launched in 1647, rebuilt in 1690 and 1707 and wrecked in 1711.
- HMS Ormonde (1711), a 50-gun fourth-rate ship of the line launched in 1711, renamed HMS Dragon in 1715, and broken up in 1733.
- HMS Dragon (1736), a 60-gun fourth-rate ship of the line launched in 1736, and scuttled as a breakwater in 1757.
- HMS Dragon (1760), a 74-gun third-rate ship of the line built in 1760 and sold in 1784.
- HMS Dragon (1798), a 74-gun third-rate ship of the line built in 1798 at Rotherhithe. Refitted in 1814, she served until 1815. She was broken up in 1850.
- HMS Dragon (1845), a 6-gun wooden paddle second-rate frigate built in 1845 and sold 1865, designed by Sir William Symonds, which served in the Baltic during the Crimean War.
- HMS Dragon (1878), a 6-gun Doterel-class screw sloop launched in 1878 and sold in 1892.
- HMS Dragon (1894), a twin-screw Banshee-class torpedo boat destroyer launched in 1894 and sold in 1912.
- HMS Lookout (1914), a Laforey-class destroyer laid down in 1913 as HMS Dragon but renamed before being launched in 1914.
- HMS Dragon (D46), a Danae-class light cruiser launched in 1917 and scuttled off Normandy in 1944 while serving in the Polish navy as ORP Dragon.
- HMS Dragon (1982) was a stone frigate of the Royal Naval Reserve in Swansea and acted as a Communications Training Centre. She was decommissioned in 1994.
- HMS Dragon (D35), is a Type 45 destroyer launched in November 2008

== Battle honours ==
Ships named Dragon have earned the following battle honours:

- Kentish Knock, 1652
- Portland, 1653
- Gabbard, 1653
- Scheveningen, 1653
- Lowestoft, 1665
- Four Days' Battle, 1666
- Orfordness, 1666
- Bugia, 1671
- Barfleur, 1692
- Belle Isle, 1761
- Martinique, 1762
- Havana, 1762
- Egypt, 1801
- Baltic, 1854–55
- Arctic, 1944
