= The Dragon Academy =

Location
- 35 Prince Arthur Avenue; Toronto, Ontario, M5R 1B2; Canada; 43.6692°N 79.3972°W

Information
- School type: Private school
- Established: 2000
- Founder: Dr. Meg Fox

The Dragon Academy was a former progressive private middle and high school located in Toronto, Ontario. It was founded by Dr. Meg Fox in the year 2000 and closed after the 2019–2020 school year, presumably due to pressures from the COVID-19 pandemic.
