= Dragon (M. C. Escher) =

Wood engraving print by M. C. Escher

- Artist: M. C. Escher
- Year: 1952
- Type: wood engraving
- Dimensions: 32 cm × 24 cm (13 in × 9.4 in)

Dragon (Dutch: Draak) is a wood engraving print created by Dutch artist M. C. Escher in April 1952, depicting a folded paper dragon perched on a pile of crystals. It is part of a sequence of images by Escher depicting objects of ambiguous dimension, including also Three Spheres I, Doric Columns, Drawing Hands and Print Gallery.

Escher wrote "this dragon is an obstinate beast, and in spite of his two-dimensions he persists in assuming that he has three". Two slits in the paper from which the dragon is folded open up like kirigami, forming holes that make the dragon's two-dimensional nature apparent. His head and neck pokes through one slit, and the tail through the other, with the head biting the tail in the manner of the ouroboros.

In Gödel, Escher, Bach, Douglas Hofstadter interprets the dragon's tail-bite as an image of self-reference, and his inability to become truly three-dimensional as a visual metaphor for a lack of transcendence, the inability to "jump out of the system". The same image has also been called out in the scientific literature as a warning about what can happen when one attempts to describe four-dimensional space-time using higher dimensions.

A copy of this print is in the collections of U.S. National Gallery of Art and the National Gallery of Canada.
