= Dragons: Fire and Ice =

- DVD cover
- Directed by: Craig Wilson
- Starring: Mark Hildreth; Richard Newman; Mark Oliver; Chiara Zanni
- Edited by: Donald Briggs
- Music by: Brian Carson; Ari Wise
- Production companies: Mega Bloks Inc. Bardel Entertainment
- Distributed by: Lions Gate Home Entertainment
- Release date: October 12, 2004
- Running time: 73 minutes
- Countries: United States; Canada
- Language: English

Dragons: Fire & Ice is a 2004 animated fantasy adventure film and the first of a two-part series based on the Mega Bloks toyline. The film was released directly to DVD in 2004, but also aired on Jetix in September 2005.

The story concerns two unlikely heroes, Prince Dev of the Norvagen and Princess Kyra of the Draigar. These two band together along with their dragons, Targon and Aurora, to help save Dragon World and their world from evil. A sequel, Dragons: Metal Ages, was released in 2005.

== Plot ==
In the past, the dragons and their crystals of power came to the human world through a portal. While the dragons brought knowledge and wanted only peace, the human kingdoms of Norvagen and Draigar wanted war and misused the knowledge brought by the dragons. Thoron, the Dragon King and holder of the legendary Aurathon crystal, appointed the wizard Xenoz as an ambassador for the dragons, giving him immortality and power over the dragons' crystals. After an evil force killed the Dragon Queen, Thoron and his followers returned to their world, vowing to return only after the war had ended.

In the present day, King Olsef of the Norvagen Kingdom is giving his eight-year-old son, Prince Dev, some practice for battle while expressing his hatred for the Draigar, who he believes hunted the remaining dragons to near-extinction. While Dev's practice shows him to be too impulsive, Olsef believes nevertheless that he is ready to begin riding on Targon, the only dragon that they have left. During this time, Xenoz arrives and gives Dev his blessing. Meanwhile, in the Draigar kingdom, King Siddari is training Princess Kyra in the same form and blames the Norvagen for the disappearances of the dragons. Xenoz comes by to give the same blessing he gave to Dev so that Kyra can begin flying on the Draigar's last dragon, Aurora. During the flight, a black dragon marks Dev and Kyra with his mystical teardrops before disappearing.

Eight years later, Dev and Kyra have developed mystical abilities and want the war to end, but their fathers object to their ideas on how it should. They both violate orders and continue with their ideas anyway, catching the attention of Xenoz. The two royals fight until their fathers and armies show up to fight to the death once and for all. Just before the battle commences, the Vorgans capture the kings. Xenoz rescues Dev and Kyra and instructs them to retrieve the Aurathon from a rogue dragon to rescue their fathers. Dev and Kyra confront the dragon, but are quickly overpowered. The dragon reveals that he is Thoron and that Xenoz previously conspired to kill the Dragon Queen with the help of Stendhal, a dragon with a grudge against Thoron. Stendhal was imprisoned, but broke free 1,000 years later and attacked Thoron. During the battle, the Aurathon was activated and Thoron was transported to the human world. Knowing he lacked the strength to fight Xenoz, Thoron used the Aurathon to empower Dev and Kyra. Knowing now where their elemental abilities came from, Dev and Kyra begin practicing their powers over fire and air, but tear a hole in the Ring of Oroborus, alerting Xenoz to their position. They escape the attack with Targon and Aurora's help and head for Xenoz's castle.

Dev and Kyra break into Xenoz's castle and quickly dispatch the Vorgan guards, but are captured by Xenoz, who finds out that the Aurathon is within them and extracts it from their bodies. Meanwhile, Thoron crashes through and falls to the base of the castle, where he discovers the skeleton of the Dragon Queen. With a new driving force, he heads off to fight Xenoz, who then betrays Gortaz, the Vorgan leader, and sends him falling to his doom. Dev and Kyra continue to fight despite losing their powers, and during the scuffle, Xenoz' face was revealed to have been eternally scarred by Thoron, making him seek revenge. Xenoz opens the portal to Dragon World and traps Thoron in ice, believing that Dev and Kyra are weak and cannot do anything. Thoron begs to differ, pointing out that Dev and Kyra were chosen by the dragons themselves. With this, Dev and Kyra use their elemental abilities to break free and reunite the Aurathon with Thoron, who drags Xenoz back to Dragon World.

The next day, both Norvagen and Draigar armies celebrate at Olsef's castle. During the celebration, the dragons return. Dev and Kyra jump on to Targon and Aurora to join the flight. As the celebration continues, Xenoz vows to escape his prison in Dragon World.

== Cast ==
- Mark Hildreth as Dev, the prince of the Norvagen. He was empowered by Thoron using the Aurathon, giving him power over wind. Dev is worried about his emotions and temper, which are connected to his powers, and fears what destiny may lie in wait if he is not able to subdue them.
  - Danny McKinnon as young Dev
- Chiara Zanni as Kyra, the princess of the Draigar. She was empowered by Thoron using the Aurathon, giving her power over fire. In addition, Kyra is proficient in martial arts and wields a Bō staff.
  - Britt Irvin as young Kyra
- Mark Oliver as Xenoz, a wizard with power over ice. Along with Stendhal, Xenoz killed the Dragon Queen and many other dragons, taking their crystals to empower himself. After he killed the Dragon Queen, Xenoz was attacked by Thoron, who scarred his face. Following this, Xenoz began using an ice mask which resembles his original face.
- Richard Newman as Thoron, the king of the dragons. Thoron can pass between both the human and dragon worlds and activate magical locations no others can. His crystal is the Aurathon, which he split into two pieces and used to empower Dev and Kyra.
- Ron Halder as Olsef, the king of the Norvagen.
- Brian Drummond as Siddari, the king of the Draigar.
- Brian Dobson as Gortaz, the leader of the Vorgan army and an ally of Xenoz. Gortaz is eventually betrayed by Xenoz, resulting in his death.
