= Dragovići =

Dragovići may refer to:

- Dragovići (Hadžići), a village near Hadžići, Bosnia and Herzegovina
- Dragovići (Novo Goražde), a village near Novo Goražde, Bosnia and Herzegovina
- Dragovići, Vareš, a village near Vareš, Bosnia and Herzegovina
- Dragovići, Croatia, a village near Vrbovsko, Croatia
- Dragovići, Donja Vrućica, a hamlet in Donja Vrućica, Croatia
- Dragovići, Podosoje, a hamlet in Podosoje, Runovići, Croatia
- Dragovići, Sonković, a hamlet in Sonković, Croatia
- Dragovići, Željezno Žumberačko, a hamlet of Željezno Žumberačko, Croatia

== See also ==
- Dragović (surname), a South Slavic surname
- Dragovic (disambiguation)
- Dragovich (disambiguation)
- Drago (disambiguation)
