= Drago =

Drago may refer to:

== People ==
- Drago (given name)
- Drago (surname)
- Drago (wrestler), Mexican professional wrestler Víctor Soto
- Drago Dumbovic, Croatian footballer known simply as Drago
- Drago, nickname of Alexander Volkov
- Prince del Drago, 1860–1956, Italian noble and New York socialite

== Fictional characters ==
- Ivan Drago, a boxer in the film Rocky IV
- Blackie Drago, a supervillain from Marvel Comics
- Drago, a character from Jackie Chan Adventures
- Dragos, dinosaur-like creatures in the video game Mother 3
- Drago, the Dragonoid from Bakugan series

== Other uses ==
- Drago (publisher), International publishing house of contemporary art
- Drago (river), Sicily
- Drago Doctrine, announced in 1902 by the Argentine Minister of Foreign Affairs, Luis María Drago
- Drago restaurants of California
- Drago, common name for the species Dracaena draco

== See also ==
- Proper names derived from Drag-
- Proper names derived from Draz-
- Dragon (disambiguation)
- Draco (disambiguation)
- Dracaena (disambiguation)
- Dragovići (disambiguation)
- Dragovich (disambiguation)
- Dragovic (disambiguation)
- Dragosloveni (disambiguation)
- Drăgoiești (disambiguation)
