= Draconic (disambiguation) =

Draconic is a Serbian heavy metal band.

Draconic may also refer to:

- Of or pertaining to a dragon
- Of or pertaining to the constellation Draco
- A harsh punishment, in reference to the Greek lawgiver Draco
- The fictional language used in the video game The Elder Scrolls V: Skyrim
- The fictional language used in the table top role-playing game franchise Dungeons & Dragons
- Draconic period, an orbital period

== See also ==
- Draco (disambiguation)
- Draconian (disambiguation)
