= Brian Sommer =

American voice actor

- Born: San Leandro, California
- Occupation: Voice actor
- Years active: 2001–present
- Website: www.briansommer.com

Brian Sommer is an American voice actor. He has provided the voice of characters in 81 video game titles including, Telltale Games' The Walking Dead and Wolf Among Us, Blizzard Entertainment's Diablo III and Hearthstone: The Grand Tournament, Arkane Studios' Prey, and Activisions' Bakugan: Defenders of the Core.

In addition to voicing characters, Brian has been the announcer for events at the Disneyland Hotel, The Walt Disney Family Museum, and the Anaheim Halloween Parade.

Brian is a voice acting instructor at the Voicetrax Academy in Sausalito, CA, and the on-line Global Voice Acting Academy.

== Filmography ==
=== Film ===
- The Addams Family 2 – Big Bad Ronny

=== Video games ===
- America's Army: Rise of a Soldier – Lead Southern Soldier
- Armored Core: Last Raven – Additional voices (credited as B. Sommer)
- Avenue Flo: Special Delivery - Bernie the Bookworm, Seymour the Senior
- Bakugan: Defenders of the Core – Drago, American Old Man
- Bone: Out from Boneville – Rat Creature 2
- Bone: The Great Cow Race – Dirk, Purple Rat Creature
- Chromehounds - Master Sergeant Jayrus Cole, Alexi Izmailov, Carlos Nadal
- CSI: Hard Evidence – Toby Hinkley
- Deadly Premonition – Keith Ingram
- Death Jr. 2: Root of Evil – Billy Galaxy, Louie Llama
- Diablo III – Monster voices
- Infinite Space – Pirate Valantin
- Kelvin and the Infamous Machine – Dr. Lupin, Gravedigger, Impresario, Librarian, Blacksmith
- League of Legends – Willump, Tryndamere, Warwick
- Phantasy Star Universe – Renvolt Magashi
- Psychonauts 2 – Bob Zanotto, Judge, Germ Crane Operator
- Sam & Max Beyond Time and Space – Monster, Brady Culture
- Sam & Max Save the World – Brady Culture, Drivers
- Sam & Max: The Devil's Playhouse – Frankie
- The Walking Dead – Danny St. John
- The Walking Dead: Season 2 – Pete
- The Wolf Among Us – Colin
- Manual Samuel – Narrator
- U.B. Funkeys – Jerry Pearl
- The Elder Scrolls Online - Mulaamnir, Yandir the Butcher
