= Dragosloveni =

Dragosloveni may refer to:

- Dragosloveni, a village in Dumbrăveni, Vrancea, Romania
- Dragosloveni, a village in Soveja Commune, Vrancea County, Romania

== See also ==
- Drăgoiești (disambiguation)
- Drago (disambiguation)
