= Drakon =

Drakon may refer to:

== Arts and entertainment ==
- Drakon Empire, a fictional group from Sonic the Comic
- Drakon (novel), a novel by S. M. Stirling
- Constantine Drakon, a fictional character from DC comics
- Lord Drakkon, Character in Mighty Morphin Power Rangers Shattered Grid

== Other uses ==
- Draco (lawgiver), an ancient Greek lawgiver infamous for his harsh penalties, source of the word "draconian"
- DRAKON, a programming language
- 3M7 Drakon, a Soviet missile tank
- INS Drakon, Israeli dolphin-class submarine
- Drakon (roller coaster), a roller coaster at Paultons Park, Hampshire, England

== See also ==
- Dragon (Ancient Greek drakôn δράκων)
- Draco (disambiguation)
