= Dragovic =

Dragovic, Dragović or Dragovič may refer to:

== People ==
- Dragović (surname), a South Slavic surname

== Places ==
- Dragovič, Juršinci, a village in Slovenia
- Dragović, Pakrac, a village in Croatia
- Dragović Monastery, a monastery in Croatia

== See also ==
- Dragovich (disambiguation)
- Dragovići (disambiguation)
- Drago (disambiguation)
