= Dracaena =

Dracaena (romanized form of the Greek δράκαινα - drakaina, "female dragon") can mean:

- Drakaina (mythology), a Greek mythological entity
- Dracaena (plant), a genus of plants
- Cordyline australis, a plant commonly known as the Dracaena palm
- Dracaena (lizard), a genus of lizard
- Dracena, a town in Brazil
- Dracaena, a fictional dragon-woman in Percy Jackson & the Olympians
- Drakaina (model) (born 1975), a French actress and model.

== See also ==
- Dragon (disambiguation)
- Draco (disambiguation)
- Drago (disambiguation)
