= Dragovich =

Dragovich may refer to:

== People ==
=== Fictional characters ===
- Lana Dragovich, a fictional character from the webseries Girltrash!
- Nikita Dragovich, a fictional character from the videogame Call of Duty: Black Ops
- Razlan Dragovich, a fictional character from the TV series The Unit, see List of The Unit characters

== Other uses ==
- Dragovich v. Department of the Treasury, No. 10-1564 (N.D. Cal.), see Defense of Marriage Act#Other cases

== See also ==
- Dragovic (disambiguation)
- Dragovići (disambiguation)
- Drago (disambiguation)
