= Draconian =

Draconian is an adjective meaning "of excessive severity", that derives from Athenian lawmaker Draco, who created a law code in 7th century BC and imposed severe punishments for offences against it.

Draconian may also refer to:

== Publications ==
- The Draconian, school magazine of the Dragon School in Oxford, England
- Draconian (Dragonlance), a fictional species in the Dragonlance novels

== Video games ==
- Draconian (video game), a computer game released in 1984
- Draconian, a race from Age of Wonders: Shadow Magic video game

== Television ==
- Draconian (Doctor Who), an extraterrestrial race from the Doctor Who television series
- Draconian Empire, a Humanoid Race in the Buck Rogers in the 25th Century TV series

== Other uses ==
- Draconian (band), a Gothic death/doom metal band from Sweden

== See also ==
- The Draconian Rage, an audio drama
- Draco (disambiguation)
- Draconia (disambiguation)
- Draconic (disambiguation)
