= Draconia =

Draconia may refer to:

== Taxonomy ==
- Draconia (moth), a moth genus in the family Thyrididae
- A synonym for the plant genus Artemisia

== Fiction ==
- Home planet of the Draconians in the television series Doctor Who
- An artificial planet in Menace (video game)
- An island in Tibia (video game)
- An alien ship in Buck Rogers in the 25th Century (film)
- A planet in Buck Rogers in the 25th Century (TV series)
- A family in Disney Twisted-Wonderland

== Other ==
- Racehorse, winner of 1926 Tremont Stakes

== See also ==
- Draconian (disambiguation)
