= Draco =

Draco is the Greco-Latin word for serpent, or dragon.

Draco or Drako most often refers to:

- Draco (constellation), a constellation in the northern part of the sky
- Draco (lawgiver) (from Greek: Δράκων; 7th century BC), the first lawgiver of ancient Athens, from whom the term draconian is derived

Draco or Drako may also refer to:

== Places ==
- Draco Peak, a summit in Alberta, Canada
- Draco (dwarf galaxy), a dwarf galaxy orbiting the Milky Way
- Draco Supercluster (SCL 114), a galaxy supercluster in the constellation Draco

== People ==
- Draco (physician) (from Greek: Δράκων), the name of several physicians in the family of Hippocrates
- Draco Rosa (born 1969), a Puerto Rican songwriter and former member of Puerto Rican boy band Menudo
- Dean Drako, American businessman

=== Fictional characters ===
- Draco Malfoy, a character in the Harry Potter series
- Drako, a character in the Teenage Mutant Ninja Turtles franchise
- Draco (Caminhos do Coração), a character from the 2008 Brazilian telenovela Os Mutantes - Caminhos do Coração
- Draco, the name of the last dragon in the film Dragonheart.
- Draco, a character from Hercules: The Legendary Journeys and Xena: Warrior Princess
- Antares Draco, an Imperial Knight from Star Wars: Legacy
- Jaq Draco, an Inquisitor who is the protagonist of Ian Watson's Inquisition War Trilogy
- Marc Ange Draco, head of European crime syndicate and James Bond's father-in-law in Ian Fleming's novels
- Draco, a character in the fictional opera The Dream Oath: Maria and Draco in Final Fantasy VI
- Draco, a dragon from the card game Magic: The Gathering
- Draco Centauros, a dragon-like humanoid from the Puyo Puyo video game series, and one of the three main protagonists in the third main game in the series, Puyo Puyo Sun.
- Dragonair, a Dragon-type Pokémon known as "Draco" in the French versions of the game
- Draco, a legendary brawler from the mobile game Brawl Stars

== Arts, entertainment, and media ==
- Draco, a show aired by BabyTV starting in 2007

=== Music ===
- Draco and the Malfoys, an American rock band
- "Draco" (song), by Future, 2017

== History ==
- Draconian constitution, or Draco's code, a 7th-century BC written law code
- Dacian Draco, a Dacian military standard composed of a wolf head and snake tail
- Draco (military standard), a Roman cavalry military standard in the shape of a dragon, adopted after the Dacian Wars

== Biology and medicine ==
- Draco (lizard), a genus of gliding lizards
- Draco, a widely used synonym of Dracaena (plant)
  - Dracaena draco, a species of dragon tree
- DRACO, a group of experimental antiviral drugs

== Computing ==
- Draco (programming language), a shareware programming language for CP/M and the Amiga
- DraCo, a partly Amiga compatible computer built by MacroSystem AG
- Draco Linux, a Linux distribution

== Spaceflight ==
- DRACO, camera module of NASAs DART Mission
- Draco (rocket engine), an orbital maneuvering thruster being built for the SpaceX Dragon and upper stage of the Falcon 9 spacecraft
- SuperDraco, a liquid rocket engine designed and built by SpaceX. Used for the launch escape system of the SpaceX Dragon 2
- Demonstration Rocket for Agile Cislunar Operations (DRACO), a cancelled US DOD program for a nuclear-thermal rocket

== Weaponry and arms ==
- Draco Pistol, Romanian semi-automatic pistols
- Draco, a civilian version of the Pistol Mitralieră model 1963/1965
- Draco, a prototype of a SPAA version of the Centauro 8x8 fighting vehicle of the Italian Army

== Other uses ==
- Draco Racing, a motorsports team in Italy
- Draco, name given by the U.S. cable channel The Weather Channel to the December 2012 North American blizzard
- Draco, a guitar built by B.C. Rich guitars
- Pilatus U-28 Draco, a United States Air Force surveillance plane
- Draco, one of the dogs that tore apart Actaeon

== See also ==
- Draconian (disambiguation)
- Dracula (disambiguation)
- Dracaena (disambiguation)
- Drago (disambiguation)
- Dragon (disambiguation)
- Drakon (disambiguation)
