= List of Bakugan =

This article contains a list of the known Bakugan that appear in the Bakugan Battle Brawlers franchise.

The Bakugan are a group of creatures that come from Vestroia. Each of the Bakugan are associated with a different element ranging from Pyrus (the attribute of fire), Subterra (the attribute of earth), Haos (the attribute of light), Darkus (the attribute of darkness), Aquos (the attribute of water), and Ventus (the attribute of wind).

== Battle Brawlers Bakugan ==
The following Bakugan are owned by the Battle Brawlers:

=== "Drago (Pyrus Dragonoid)" ===
Voiced by: Keiji Fujiwara (Japanese); Jason Deline, Brian Sommer (Defenders of the Core) (English)

The main protagonist of the series (alongside Dan) and also Dan's partner who resembles a dragon. Drago is the leader of the Bakugan with strong convictions and morals, and is arguably the most powerful of all Bakugan. Together with Dan, they set out to defeat those who threaten the safety of Humans and Bakugan alike, and restore the world of Vestroia. Drago is highly intelligent in battle and has the ability to radiate intense heat, burning away anything around him. He is limited in battle mobility, but compensates for it through flight and powerful strikes. Being one of the rare few to inherit the Ultimate Warrior Gene, Drago is able to almost infinitely evolve to much stronger forms. Despite his maturity, Drago's still quite young for a Bakugan, and displays it through his occasional temper or impatience.

- Delta Dragonoid

Drago's first evolution during Dan, Runo, and Marucho's battle against Julio, Klaus, and Chan Lee in Drago's On Fire. He fought against Dual Hydranoid, and lost, sending him to the Doom Dimension. In the Doom Dimension he battled Apollonir, after defeating him, he had to defeat Shun, Julie, Runo, and Marucho. He has three sleek horns and a hard plated armor in ball mode with chrome rings. He has an extra set of wings and a pitchfork tail.

- Ultimate Dragonoid

Drago's second evolution when he defeated Storm Skyress. He has markings on his wings, which are now split, and he also has two horns that are merged. With his new powers, Drago was able to eventually defeat Alpha Hydranoid, becoming the strongest Bakugan on Earth and allowing Dan to reach the top rank by dethroning Masquerade.

- Infinity Dragonoid

Drago's third evolution (as an ultimate Bakugan) occurred when he absorbed the Infinity Core from his beloved Wavern, after she offered herself as sacrifice to prevent her evil brother Naga from obtaining it. After defeating Naga, Drago absorbed the Silent Core, becoming the complete Perfect Dragonoid. To restore Vestroia to its original form, Drago sacrificed himself, merging the two cores into one, uniting the six realms of Vestroia into a single planet, with the "Perfect Core" as the center of this "New Vestroia".

- Neo Dragonoid

When the Vestals invaded New Vestroia and captured all the Bakugan, the Ancient Warriors needed someone to save the planet, and separated Drago's soul from the Perfect Core, regenerating his body in a new, much weaker form. Reunited with Dan, Drago and the Bakugan Resistance engaged in many battle against the Vestals and discovered that he is still connected to the core and can call upon its power in extreme situations. When Dan lost his battle against Spectra and Helios, Drago was taken and used against his will. With the Perfect Core abilities being overused, the Ancient Warriors realized that if Drago died, the Core and New Vestroia would be destroyed. Upon reaching new levels of strength against Helios, the Ancient Warriors were able to complete separating Drago from the Core, granting him a spark of its power to open portals between New Vestroia and Earth. Having earned his freedom, Drago returned home with Dan.

- Cross Dragonoid

Drago's next evolution when he inherits the Pyrus attribute energy from Apollonir, who sacrificed himself in Six Degrees of Destruction. He later lost the Pyrus energy when he, Helios, and Wilda lost a battle against Farbros and Dryoid.

- Helix Dragonoid

Drago's next evolution when the BT System fired in Exodus. To save New Vestroia, Drago attempted to carry the device away from the planet and was caught in the blast. By sheer willpower, Drago survived, evolved due to exposure to the 6 Attribute energies that powered the weapon, and redirected the blast away. This evolution also marks the first anthropomorphic design of Drago. He can now combine with his new Battle Gear JetKor, a dual cannon blaster which can shoot various energy blasts to defeat opponents. Unlike Helios' Battle Gear, it was made using Drago's own DNA so that it'd be more organic in nature, due to Drago's hatred of mechanical Bakugan and not wanting to become a cyborg like Helios. Because of this, JetKor acts like a part of Drago's own body when he uses it.

- Lumino Dragonoid

Drago's next evolution in Gundalian Invaders. He evolved in, when Neo Ziperator gave him the Element in The Element. He has four wings and a tail with a giant X shape on it. Curiously his body looks like an amalgamation between his previous forms Cross and Helix. This marks the quickest time Drago has evolved in any of the series. His second Battle Gear is Explosix Gear (Cross Buster), similar to the JetKor with the only differences being the appearance of the cannons and its expansion to cover Drago's new wings. From this on, he also started to use two Mobile Assault Vehicles: Raytheus, a large motorcycle like hover vehicle with a laser mounted in front, and Jakalier, a resemblance to the ocelot's glider with the only difference being Dan being able to ride inside of it.

- Blitz Dragonoid

Drago's next evolution when Dragonoid Colossus evolves him as a reward for defeating him in Genesis. He now has armor covering his front body and has a set of wings again, but bigger than his previous version's wing, Lumino Dragonoid. He is also able to combine with Dragonoid Colossus respectively. His third Battle is Axator Gear, given from Dragonoid Collossus. In this form, he represents the original Dragonoid who banished the Nonets to the Doom Dimension.

- Titanium Dragonoid

Drago's next evolution, when Code Eve rewarded him for defeating Barodius and Dharak in Destiny Revealed. His Mechtogan is Zenthon and his Mechtogan Titan is Zenthon Titan. His BakuNano is Sonicannon, while his Mobile Assault Vehicles are the motorbike Zoompha and surfboard-like Rapilator. He gave some of Code Eve's power to the other Brawlers to summon their Mechtogan.

- Fusion Dragonoid

After connecting the power of the Gate and Key, Drago evolved again to a "Baku Sky Raider" of himself. His razor sharp wings and infamous horn give him tenacious attack when he leaps into battle. Only the bravest opponents can measure up to the combined ruthlessness and courage of Fusion Dragonoid. Fused with Reptak, he becomes Aeroblitz. His Battle Suit is Defendtrix.

- Maxus Dragonoid / Maxus Cross Dragonoid
Neo Dragonoid's / Cross Dragonoid's transformation when combined with the six mechanical Bakugan Traps Brachium, Grafias, Dark Hound, Grakas Hound, Spitarm, and Spyderfencer.

=== Skyress ===
Voiced by: Chiharu Suzuka (Japanese); Barbara Budd (English)

Skyress is Shun's guardian Bakugan that resembles a phoenix. She possesses the ultimate ability to resurrect herself. Her Impressive vision scours the horizon. She has gigantic wingspan and numerous long tails with bladed feathers at its tip. She is noble with a chivalrous spirit and fair in battle. Shun received Skyress as a gift from his sick mother right before she fell into a coma (in the English version; in the Japanese, she died).

- Storm Skyress

Storm Skyress evolved from Skyress when Shun met an illusionary girl he realized was his mother in the past. Because of him missing his mother, he wanted to stay with her so that she would not get ill like she did, realized he could not live alone with an illusionary form of his younger mother and his friends were depending on him. She is a larger, stronger version of Skyress with a colossal wingspan and a blade-tipped tail. In Blast From the Past, she was killed by Mechtavius Destroyer, but was resurrected when the Brawlers went back in time to stop Mechtavius Destroyer from destroying the universe.

=== Ingram ===
Voiced by: Takayuki Masuda (Japanese); Stacey DePass, Amy Rubinate (Defenders of the Core) (English)

Shun's second Guardian Bakugan in New Vestroia. Shun saved Ingram in midair when he was being sucked into the Vestal Destroyer. Ingram is a bird-type monster with six wings and a hard-plated steel chest. His sharp, clawed feet can shred his opponents. He can also fly high into the air and nosedive directly into his opponents to eliminate them.

- Master Ingram

Voiced by: Takayuki Masuda (Japanese); Joseph Motiki (English)

Ingram's evolution after gaining Oberus' elemental energy in Six Degrees of Destruction. Ingram is now a ninja/warrior Bakugan with an additional set of wings who can call upon Shadow Wing as a battle partner. He lost the Ventus energy when he and Nemus lost a battle against Boriates and Macubass, due to the Vexos' cheating. In Blast From the Past, he was killed by Mechtavius Destroyer, but was resurrected when the Brawlers went back in time to stop Mechtavius Destroyer from destroying the universe.

=== Hawktor ===
Voiced by: Kōichi Tōchika (Japanese); Brian Froud (English)

Shun's third Guardian Bakugan that resembles a humanoid hawk in Gundalian Invaders. He appeared in Phantom Data Attack along with Aranaut, Akwimos, and Coredem. In Hostile Takeover, his real form replaced Shun's synthetic Bakugan. Hawktor is excited to be partnered with Shun, eager to learn some stealth attacks from the ninja. His Battle Gear is Swayther, a giant jet pack with dual laser cannons on the wings.

=== Taylean ===
Voiced by: Kyle McDonald

Shun's fourth Guardian Bakugan in Arc 1 of Mechtanium Surge. Taylean is from Neathia as such he is always calm about how to approach things. Taylean is Shun's first bakugan to not resemble a bird. His BakuNano is Hammermor and his Mobile Assault Vehicle is Zoompha. His Battle Suit is Blasterate. In Blast From the Past, he was killed by Mechtavius Destroyer, but was resurrected when the Brawlers went back in time to stop Mechtavius Destroyer from destroying the universe.

=== Jaakor ===
Voiced by: Dan Petronijevic

Shun's fifth Guardian Bakugan in Arc 2 of Mechtanium Surge. He is a Baku Sky Raider. He is the one who is strong and even the one who seeks supreme power. It is his second bakugan to not resemble a bird, instead, it resembles Taylean and Primo Vulcan. Its Baku Sky Raider Combination with Skytress and Oberum is Magmafury

=== Preyas ===
Voiced by: Eiji Miyashita (Japanese); Shawn Meunier, Carman Melville (S2E4) (English)

Preyas is a chameleon-like Bakugan with strong loyalty to Marucho. His greatest strength is that Preyas can change his molecular structure allowing him to turn to Darkus or Subterra. Even though he has a menacing appearance, he is shy and comical. Small in comparison to the other monsters, Preyas makes up for it in speed. Preyas reappears in Return to New Vestroia.and in mechtanium surge when Dan and Drago go to New Vestroia and start training on an island they meet him and his student. In Blast From the Past, he was killed by Mechtavius Destroyer, but was resurrected when the Brawlers went back in time to stop Mechtavius Destroyer from destroying the universe.

- Preyas Angelo & Preyas Diablo

Voiced by: Takayuki Kondō and Shintarō Ōhata (Japanese); Shawn Meunier (English)

Instead of evolving, Preyas regurgitated a mutated version of himself. The second Preyas has a split personality, one side is hotheaded and extremely rude, and the other is peaceful and overly polite. The rude side looks like demon version of Preyas and is a pyrus/aquos hybrid, called Preyas Diablo (demon); the polite side looks like an angel version of Preyas and is a haos/aquos hybrid, called Preyas Angelo (angel). Although the original Preyas has been found in New Vestroia, Preyas II hasn't even been mentioned. In Blast From the Past, he was killed by Mechtavius Destroyer, but was resurrected when the Brawlers went back in time to stop Mechtavius Destroyer from destroying the universe.

=== Elfin ===
Voiced by: Maki Kobayashi (Japanese); Ellen Ray Hennessey, Caroly Larson, Stephanie Komure (Defenders of the Core) (English)

Marucho's second Guardian Bakugan that resembles a frog-like humanoid in New Vestroia. Elfin is like Preyas, for she can change attributes to gain an advantage during battle. Before joining with Marucho, she protected the Bakugan from a forest in New Vestroia from the Vexos. She can shoot arrows out of its fingers. She's known to be a parody of Sailor Moon with her looks, stances and transformations. She and Preyas later started dating.

- Minx Elfin

Elfin's evolution after she inherited Frosch's Elemental energy in Six Degrees of Destruction. Her hair is now twisted and she has a heart on her chest. She lost the Aquos energy when she lost a battle against Dryoid and MAC Spider. In Blast From the Past, she was killed by Mechtavius Destroyer, but was resurrected when the Brawlers went back in time to stop Mechtavius Destroyer from destroying the universe.

=== Akwimos ===
Voiced by: Akio Suyama (Japanese); Joseph Motiki (English)

Marucho's third Guardian Bakugan that resembles a Gill-man in Gundalian Invaders. He looks like Elico with swim goggles. He appeared in Phantom Data Attack, along with Aranaut, Coredem, and Hawktor. In Hostile Takeover, his real form replaced Marucho's synthetic Bakugan. His catchphrase is "Cool is the rule, dude!". He seems to have an African-American accent. His Battle Gear is Gigarth.

=== Trister ===
Voiced by: Carman Melville

Marucho's fourth Guardian Bakugan in Arc 1 of Mechtanium Surge. Trister is from Gundalia and is always looking for a fight. His BakuNano is Crosstriker. In Blast From the Past, he was killed by Mechtavius Destroyer, but was resurrected when the Brawlers went back in time to stop Mechtavius Destroyer from destroying the universe.

=== Radizen ===
Voiced by: Hadley Kay

Marucho's fifth Guardian Bakugan in Arc 2 of Mechtanium Surge. He represents a kappa and very much agitated with Roxtor. His BakuFusion Combination is Betakor.

=== Tigrerra ===
Voiced by: Atsushi Ono (Japanese); Stevie Vallance and Martha Ferguson (S2E1) (English)

A Bakugan that resembles a saber-toothed white tiger. Tigrerra is a beast with a strong bond to Runo and willing to defend her with incredible ferocity. She possesses a gigantic blade inside her body capable of cutting any substance in the human world. She has a very human like nature with a strong sense of duty. Tigrerra is kind and often protective. Runo nicknames Tigrerra "Tig". In the Japanese version, Tigrerra is a male named Tigres, nicknamed "Tora-chan" by Runo. Tora means tiger in Japanese.

- Blade Tigrerra

Tigrerra's next evolution that resembles an anthropomorphic version of Tigrerra, which has long, yellow retractable blades at her hands, knees and shoulders. She is able to stand normally on two legs. In "Bakugan: New Vestroia", she was partnered up with Baron. But when they were battling Spectra and Helios, she sacrificed herself to save Nemus. She was taken back to the royal palace to be turned into a bronze trophy for Prince Hydron. She was later freed and reunited with Runo. In the second arc of Mechtanium Surge, it was revealed that she returned to New Vestroia with Preyas and Hammer Gorem and became Aerogan's master. In Blast From the Past, she was killed by Mechtavius Destroyer, but was resurrected when the Brawlers went back in time to stop Mechtavius Destroyer from destroying the universe.

=== Aerogan ===
Runo's new partner in Mechtanium Surge and Blade Tigrerra's apprentice. He first appeared in Jump to Victory, when he traveled to Earth in search of a new partner and ended up teaming up with Runo to help Dan, Drago, and Reptak in a battle with Wiseman. After winning the battle, Aerogan returned to New Vestroia to keep training with Tigrerra. Despite this, he returned in Blast From the Past, where he was killed by Mechtavius Destroyer, but was resurrected when the Brawlers went back in time to stop Mechtavius Destroyer from destroying the universe.

=== Gorem ===
Voiced by: Hiroki Yasumoto (Japanese); Stephen R. Hart (English)

A Bakugan that resembles a large golem. Gorem is one of the largest Bakugan and its body is composed of exceptionally dense cells making it very heavy. When battling it uses its massive fist and a shield decreasing the G power of any Bakugan. Normally gentle and obedient, only Julie can calm it down when angry. It evolves into Hammer Gorem.

- Hammer Gorem

Hammer Gorem is the next evolution of Gorem. It is a stronger more powerful evolution with an impressive coat of armor and bull-like horns protruding from its head. Hammer Gorem wields a highly destructive double-sided hammer to pound its enemies into the ground. He later went back to New Vestroia with Blade Tigrerra and Preyas, though this was not shown. In Blast From the Past, he was killed by Mechtavius Destroyer, but was resurrected when the Brawlers went back in time to stop Mechtavius Destroyer from destroying the universe.

=== Hydranoid ===
Voiced by: Izō Oikawa (Japanese); Craig Marshall, Robert Tinkler (S2E26) (English)

Alice's guardian Bakugan (Masquerade's before). Hydranoid is one of the strongest species with a body composed of a highly intelligent, independent cell structure. It is completely controlled by Masquerade and obeys all of Masquerade's commands. This one-headed Hydra-like Bakugan has very strong armor, a dragon-like face, spines all over its body, and a sharp flail for a tail. Its mobility is extremely slow, but can battle all species with its extremely powerful and forceful strikes. Hydranoid is a mercilessly cruel and unforgiving monster, not to mention extremely violent and arrogant that feeds off the power of Bakugan sent to the Doom Dimension by Masqerade. Like his old nemesis (now close friend) Drago, Hydranoid can evolve into a more powerful monster.

- Dual Hydranoid

Hydranoid's first evolution with two heads. Hydranoid now also has two tails. He seems to be partially mechanical even though his evolution was completely natural, unlike Helios who was evolved by Vestal Technology. His arrogant, merciless personality is unchanged.

- Alpha Hydranoid

Hydranoid's second evolution with three heads. Even more of his body looks mechanical, and he now has three pairs of wings. The armor on the front of his body can rotate like a huge grinder after he ensnares his opponent with metal cords that erupt from chinks in his wings (this is probably a strange biological feature). He now battles as Alice's Bakugan guardian (because the Silent Core's negative energy finally leaving him and Alice, leaving Alice as just herself, without Masquerade), caring for her as much as she cares for him. He can also shoot hot fire that can melt all attributes. In Blast From the Past, he was killed by Mechtavius Destroyer, but was resurrected when the Brawlers went back in time to stop Mechtavius Destroyer from destroying the universe.

=== Wavern ===
Voiced by: Nao Takamori (Japanese); Deann Degruijter, Katie Griffin (S2E42) (English)

A wyvern-like Bakugan who is Naga's twin sister and Drago's love interest. She obtained the Infinity Core and became Joe's Guardian. She used the power of the Infinity Core to cure Joe and get him out of the hospital. He later was able to use only her to defeat Masquerade in a battle. She and Drago had been going out on secret dates before the Infinity Core incident. It started when Drago slipped between the attributed world and he met Naga and Wavern, the White Ones, or non-attributed Bakugan with supposed no power. He kept visiting her ever since. She still has affection towards him. Her pet name for him is "Dragoruny".

She has also appeared in Bakugan Mechtanium Surge.

=== Coredem ===
Voiced by: Dai Matsumoto (Japanese); Ron Pardo (English)

Jake's Guardian Bakugan resembles a King. He appeared in New Vestroia: Episode 43 along with Aranaut, Akwimos, and Hawktor. In Episode 8, his real form replaced Jake's synthetic Bakugan. His Battle Gear is Rock Hammer.

=== Reptak ===
Voiced by: Yuiichi Nakamura (Japanese) George Tchortov (English)

The guardian Bakugan of Gunz which he is the most skilled Bakugan in tactics and cunning style. As of Wiseman Cometh, he is teamed up with Dan until he can find Gunz. He and Gunz were finally reunited in Doom Dimension Throwdown.

== Bakugan of the Top Brawlers ==
The following Bakugan are owned by the Top Brawlers:

=== Sirenoid ===
Voiced by: Fuyuka Oura (Japanese); Julie Lemieux (English)

Klaus's Guardian who resembles a Mermaid. She wears a long, flowing robes and protects herself with the harp she carries. Sirenoid is mostly based on Sirens that lure in sailors by looks or by any devious way like how Sirenoid uses a harp. She is in love with her master Klaus Von Hertzon, and when she is living in Vestal, she lives in the fish tank of Klaus' office, albeit in her open Bakugan sphere form. This is referencing the fact that she is an Aquos Bakugan.

=== Fourtress ===
Voiced by: Susumu Akagi (Japanese); Ron Pardo (English)

A Bakugan that resembles an Asura and is Chan Lee's Guardian Bakugan. He is a warrior bakugan that has three faces and four arms giving him an extra edge in battle. Fortress faces are the face of rage/phase glare (attack), the face of sadness/phase breaker (defense), the face of joy/phase driver (power-up), and the face of enlightenment (enlightenment is never shown as an ability, but is the back face in ball form and is the starting face for when Fortress appears). He became more powerful in New Vestroia.

=== Tentaclear ===
Julio's Guardian Bakugan. A Bakugan resembles a floating eye with tentacles on the side. Tentacular is unable to speak, perhaps because of his lack of a mouth. This proves to be a bad thing for Julio Santana because Harpus was making fun of him and Tentaclear could not speak for either side.

=== Harpus ===
Voiced by: Ayumi Tsunematsu (Japanese); Julie Lemieux (English)

Komba's Guardian who resembles a Harpy. She loves to make fun of any other Bakugan on the field, often calling Skyress names like 'old lady,' or 'grandma.' Her special ability card is 'Feather Storm.' She isn't the most powerful Bakugan but managed to get Komba to fifth place. She is often arrogant like Komba, making them get in many arguments, although Komba still cares for her.

=== Cycloid ===
Voiced by: Tsuguo Mogami (Japanese); Robert Hawke (English) and Carman Melville (S1E45)

A large cyclops-like Bakugan with one horn and sharp teeth. He was found in the center of Bakugan Valley. Cycloid is tough and eager to fight. His abilities include 'Left Giganti' and 'Right Giganti' which destroys the Gate Card he stands on, 'Stare Down' which creates a field that lowers the G-Power of any enemy Bakugan that steps in by 50, and 'Smack Down' which he destroys the opponent's Gate card by his hand. In New Vestroia, he sometimes calls Billy boss and often finds humans amusing and hard to understand, as proved alongside Julie's Gorem. He and Hammer Gorem battled against Midnight Percival in Bakugan Interspace.

== Doom Beings' Bakugan ==
The following Bakugan make up the Doom Beings:

=== Naga ===
Voiced by: Hideyuki Umezu (Japanese); Andrew Pifko (1), Ron Pardo (8), John Stocker (English)

Naga is the central villain on the first season. He was a rogue Bakugan who tried to control all the power in Vestroia. In order to do so, he tried to absorb the two opposite cores, but made a mistake and merged himself with the Silent Core while the Infinity Core was expelled to Earth. At the same time, Naga shot energy waves that brainwashed the Bakugan, altering the dimensional balance, and creating the Doom Beings. He also had a deep hatred for the Battle Brawlers, mainly Dan and Drago.

He is Wavern's twin brother, and he uses the Darkus attribute.

- Silent Naga

The "evolved/mutated" form of Naga after he absorbed the Silent Core into his body, having the chance to use Darkus abilities. He was killed by Infinity Dragonoid (the third evolution of Drago) to become the Perfect Core of New Vestroia.

According to one of the producers, the destruction of his physical body sent Naga's spirit to the Doom Dimension.

=== Dual-Hybrid Gatekeepers ===
The Dual-Hybrid Gatekeepers are Bakugan that have two attributes and work for Naga as gatekeepers to the rebuilt Vestroia. They later participate in Naga's attack on Earth where most of them are destroyed by the Bakugan Battle Brawlers and their allies. Among the Dual-Hybrid Gatekeepers are:

- Tayghen

Voiced by: Ayumi Fujimura (Japanese); Alyson Court (English)

An Aquos/Ventus Bakugan created by Naga. The upper half of her body is that of a human girl wearing a dress with very long sleeves and her lower half is that of a giant fish-like sea monster. She and Hairadee fought Shun and Marucho and lost. Tayghen later takes part in the attack on Earth. She was defeated by Marucho and the JJ Dolls and was destroyed for good upon her defeat.

- Hairadee

Voiced by: Ayumi Fujimura (Japanese); Carman Melville (English)

A Ventus/Aquos Bakugan created by Naga who resembles a male version of Harpus with tentacles instead of hair, webbed feet, shark-like teeth, and an overall blue and green color scheme. He and Tayghen fought Shun and Marucho and lost. Hairadee later takes part in the attack on Earth. He was destroyed in battle against Shun, Komba, and Julio.

- Tricloid

Voiced by: Kinoko Yamada (Japanese); Caroly Larson (English)

A Subterra/Haos Bakugan created by Naga and sister of Rabeeder who resembles a three-eyed version of a cyclops. She and Rabeeder fought Runo and Julie and lost. Tricloid later takes part in the attack on Earth. She was defeated by Julie, Billy, and Nene, but survived. After reuniting with Rabeeder, both of them returned to Vestroia. Their current location is unknown.

- Rabeeder

Voiced by: Marina Inoue (Japanese); Stevie Vallance (English)

A Haos/Subterra Bakugan created by Naga and sister of Tricloid who resembles a humanoid whose torso comes out of an unspecified floating metal structure with arms. She and Tricloid fought Runo and Julie and lost. Rabeeder later takes part in the attack on Earth. She was defeated by Alice, Christopher, and Klaus, but survived. Upon being reunited with Tricloid, both of them returned to Vestroia. Their current location is unknown.

- Centorrior

Voiced by: Takashi Kondō (Japanese); Scott McCord (English)

A Darkus/Pyrus Bakugan created by Naga. He resembles an armored centaur with a pointy tail. He and Druman were responsible for the death of Nova Lion. Dan and Masquerade teamed up to fight Centorrior and Druman and managed to defeat them. Centorrior later takes part in the attack on Earth. He battled Dan and Runo and was destroyed.

- Druman

Voiced by: Yoshinori Sonobe (Japanese); Joseph Motiki (English)

A Pyrus/Darkus Bakugan created by Naga. He resembles a humanoid lizard with hand-shaped wings that have an eye on them. He and Centorrior were responsible for the death of Nova Lion. Dan and Masquerade teamed up against Centorrior and Druman and defeated them. Druman later takes part in the attack on Earth. He battled Dan and Runo and was destroyed.

== Resistance's Bakugan ==
The following Bakugan are owned by the Resistance:

=== Wilda ===
Voiced by: Kenichirou Matsuda (Japanese); Ron Pardo, Gavin Hammon (Defenders of the Core) (English)

Wilda is the guardian for Mira, the leader of the Resistance and has a deafening battle cry to scare away opponents. A massive creature made of rock and hardened clay, Wilda moves slowly during battle, but his incredible durability makes up for this. He also pounds the ground forcefully to rattle his opponents before finishing them with a karate chop.

- Magma Wilda

Wilda's evolution when he inherited Clayf's elemental energy in Six Degrees of Destruction. He has a metal armor on his chest and can use a metal stick in battle. He lost the Subterra energy when he & Tigrerra lost a battle against Macubass & Aluze.

=== Roxtor ===
Voiced by: Kenichirou Matsuda (Japanese); Hadley Kay (English)

Mira's new Guardian Bakugan in Arc 2 of Bakugan Mechtanium Surge. He doesn't speak in an understandable language and always arguing with Radizen. Mira usually lets Marucho borrow him.

=== Percival ===
Voiced by: Fumi Mikawa (Japanese); Scott McCord, Mark Barbolak (Defenders of the Core) (English)

A wicked monster who uses his cape for invisibility and shoots plasma bullets from his three mouths. He also creates a black tornado with purple sparks to thrash his challenger. Percival has two dragon-head wrist guards, and his body is covered in armor-plated steel. The horns sticking out from his head and shoulders are unbreakable. Percival has a special bond with Ace. Together they battle to free the enslaved Bakugan.

- Knight Percival

Percival's first evolution when he inherited Exedra's elemental energy in Six Degrees of Destruction. Knight Percival wears a new cape that protects him from fire and water and has additional horns on his head and shoulders for increased protection from attacks. He has fire-breathing dragon heads on his shoulders and impenetrable armor protecting his arms and legs. He also carries a mammoth stainless steel sword to slay his adversaries. He lost the Darkus energy when he and Elfin lost a battle against Aluze and MAC Spyder due to the Vexos' cheating.

=== Nemus ===
Voiced by: Tsuguo Mogami (Japanese); Ron Pardo, Corey Ringdahl (Defenders of the Core) (English)

Nemus teams up with Baron to battle for freedom against the Vexos. Nemus is built like an Egyptian king where he's a towering figure with massive blade-like wings. He possesses wrist guards to deflect enemy fire and a cane that shoots a beam of light to destroy his opponents.

- Saint Nemus

Nemus's evolution when he inherited Lars Lion's elemental energy in Six Degrees of Destruction. He also gains the ability to change his attribute. He lost the Haos energy when he lost a battle against Dryoid. His new name was only mentioned in the video game.

=== Helios ===
Voiced by: Takashi Matsuyama (Japanese); Robert Tinkler, Roger L. Jackson (Defenders of the Core) (English), Andrew Jackson (Mechtanium Surge)

Spectra's Guardian Bakugan. Helios is an evil dragon that obeys every command from the heinous Spectra. Its mammoth wings allow it to move swiftly and avoid quick attacks. Helios has poisonous tipped thorns covering its body. From its mouth, it can shoot cannonball fire blasts with rapid speed. The key point of the original Helios is that 1 he uses his abilities general quasar which is usually unused for the rest of the bakugan series. Another key point being that in this form with help from the forbidden cards he manages to defeat Drago. but for some reason Spectra doesn't use the forbidden cards ever again.

- Cyborg Helios

Helios suggested that he be turned into a cyborg, since it would not have any of the weaknesses of a completely mechanical Bakugan. A computer voice can be heard when he uses his new ability FARBAS to repair himself and increase his power to match his opponents. In this form, Helios can use more cybernetical attacks like Ragnorok Cannon which soon begins to evolve into the realistic gun-like weaponry in the Bakugan series.

- Helios MK2

The power of the forbidden cards forced him to evolve artificially. Even more of his body is mechanical. Since episode 41, he was upgraded to combine with his Battle Gears, Twin Destructor (a pair of powerful cannons that attach to his back) and Zukanator (a cannon with the top appearing to look like a Castle Tower).

- Infinity Helios

Helios' next evolution in Mechtanium Surge. Helios became Darkus instead of Pyrus. His BakuNano is Bombaplode, that resembles Zukanator, except with tiny extra cannons attached to a big cannon. His Battle Suit is Doomtronic. Helios still has the "FARBAS" system.

- Maxus Helios / Maxus Helios MK2

Cyborg Helios's / Helios MK2's transformation when combined with the six mechanical Bakugan Klawgor, Scraper, Spindle, Leefram, Foxbat, and Fencer.

=== Premo Vulcan ===
Voiced by: Eiichirō Tokumoto (Japanese); Ron Pardo, Roger L. Jackson (Defenders of the Core) (English)

Gus' Guardian Bakugan. Premo Vulcan is a massive creature that is taller than most brawlers. Premo Vulcan's mighty punches shatter steel plated armor. His gigantic fists detach from its body and fire cannon-like balls.

- Rex Vulcan

Voiced by: Eiichiro Tokumoto (Japanese); Kyle MacDonald (English)

The power of the forbidden cards forced him to evolve artificially. He appeared in episode 39 and was seemingly killed by Farbros along with Elico, Hexados and his master Gus, but was revealed to have survived when he reappeared eleven episodes later, after Gus tricks Hydron into initiating a battle with him though the former soon left.

== Vexos' Bakugan ==
The following Bakugan are owned by the Vexos:

=== Farbros ===
King Zenoheld's Mechanical Bakugan. He was created with the data of ALL Bakugan launched on New Vestroia. Clay called Farbros the mighty and feared creation on all the Vestal realm. Like Altair and Hades, it is a gigantic cybernetic Bakugan but is able to repair itself (like Cyborg Helios). Zenoheld controls it manually from inside a cockpit. It is powerful enough to challenge all Six Legendary Soldiers at once. It was destroyed after the BT System got all six attribute energies, but was repaired in episode 49 and used to link to his Alternative Weapon System. It is destroyed along with the Alternative.

=== Dryoid ===
Prince Hydron's Mechanical Bakugan that looks like Robotallion, but has a more streamline-like armor. It is also a Cybernetic Bakugan. It fights with a lightsaber-like weapon, although its fighting style is more like a samurai.

=== Elico ===
Voiced by: Dan Petronijevic, Darren Jennings (Defenders of the Core)

Elico is controlled by Mylene of Vexos. He's pure strength and brute force, with defensive spikes sticking out of his shoulders and knees and six tentacles that attach to his back and can wrap around his battler's arms and legs to render the battler defenseless. Elico can breathe under water. He has a large, golden diamond that shoots a water blast to defeat his opponents. On Elico's forearms are six blades used for attacking enemies and protecting his arms. It can also change attribute. He and Brontes were thrown away by Mylene when they both got too emotional.

- Blast Elico

After evolving from the power of the forbidden cards, Elico aided Gus in battle against Zenoheld. He died taking a hit for Gus in Avenging Spectra.

=== Macubass ===
Mylene's Mechanical Bakugan after she discarded Elico. It is a Cybernetic Bakugan that resembles a robot that can turn into a manta ray-shaped jet. Its main ability is ABSIDS, which lets her control mini-pods. It was first shown battling Ace and almost beat Ace, but was beaten by Klaus. It was destroyed by Wilda in Mylene's Meltdown.

=== Hades ===
Shadow's first Mechanical Bakugan that resembles Alpha Hydranoid. Hades is a Mechanical Hydra-like Bakugan who lives to serve the Vexos. His primary weakness is that he needs to recharge after using strong attacks. He is Shadow's primary brawler when battling the Resistance. Hades has three fire breathing heads and six wings making him one of the fastest flying Bakugans. His three tails each have a spiky tip, so Hades can attack his opponent from many different directions. His metal exoskeleton can sustain multiple blows from any brawler, but on top of that, he has three large metal thorns that further protect his heart from attack. Alpha Hydranoid was the Bakugan he was based on.

=== MAC Spider ===
Shadow's second Mechanical Bakugan after Hades was destroyed by Hydranoid. It is a Cybernetic Bakugan that resembles a spider. It was destroyed by Helios in Mylene's Meltdown.

=== Brontes ===
Voiced by: Yukitoshi Tokumoto (Japanese); Robert Tinkler, Scott Reyns (Defenders of the Core) (English)

Together with Volt, Brontes brawls for the Vexos to eliminate the Resistance. Brontes is a strange, puppet-like Bakugan who can also use Darkus abilities. This mammoth monster can fly by using the propeller sticking out of his head. His gigantic legs allow him to move quickly and avoid enemy attacks, and his long arms stretch out to wrap around opponents during battle. He & Elico were thrown away by Mylene when they both got too emotional.

- Alto Brontes

Alto Brontes evolved from Brontes when Gus used the Forbidden Card on him. He has become mean spirited and gains more energy from defeated Bakugan. He has an extra set of arms to battle multiple Bakugan at once. His strength has grown ten times stronger, but has made him slower. A bright white circle on his chest can freeze a charging Bakugan with a single blast. Brontes was discarded by Gus after he served his purpose. He was last seen on New Vestroia calling out to Volt.

=== Boriates ===
Boriates is Volt's second Guardian Bakugan after Mylene discarded Brontes. He resembles a horned humanoid dressed as a samurai.

=== Altair ===
Altair is used mostly by Lync to battle the Resistance. Altair is the first Mechanical Bakugan created by Professor Clay. The lenses in its red eyes glimmer brightly to see at night. Its fangs and horns are sharp as swords. The wide spread wings have turbines to hover and white steam shoots from his mouth. It possesses a fierce battle cry that deafens its opponents.

=== Aluze ===
Lync's second Mechanical Bakugan after Altair was burned out. Aluze is a Cybernetic Bakugan who is similar to Altair. He was destroyed in Payback by Prince Hydron in the same place Altair was destroyed.

== Castle Knights' Bakugan ==
The follow Bakugan are owned by the Castle Knights:

=== Aranaut ===
Voiced by: Yasunori Masutani (Japanese); Dan Petronijevic (English)

Aranaut is partners with Fabia of the Bakugan Battle Brawlers. He is incredibly loyal to Fabia and the Castle Knights, often noting that he will defeat his opponents in the name of the Castle Knights when he stands. His whole body sparkles like platinum. He is a skilled fighter with offensive abilities, defensive skills, speed and reflexes. He is shown to be a gentlemen, such as when he met Dan's mom in episode 9. He is also equipped with a unique ability to emit an electromagnetic field from his hands. His Battle Gear is Battle Crusher.

=== Wolfurio ===
Voiced by: Daisuke Kageura (Japanese) Andrew Jackson (English)

Rafe's Guardian Bakugan. Wolfurio's appearance resembles a hybrid of Mega Nemus, Aranaut, and Siege. His BakuNano is Lanzato.

== Gundalian Forces Bakugan ==
=== Linehalt ===
Voiced by: Eiji Takemoto (Japanese); Jeremy Harris (English)

Ren's Guardian Bakugan. Resembles a fiend knight. Ren was tasked with protecting Linehalt, who he was afraid of until Linehalt saved his life. They spent most of their life training until Barodius offered them a life on the service. His Battle Gear is Boomix.

=== Rubanoid ===
Voiced by: Hirōmi Sugino (Japanese); Andrew Jackson (English)

Sid's Guardian Bakugan. Resembles a Ruby Dragon. After Sid died, Ren adopted Rubanoid and was later given to Linus Claude. His Battle Gear is Destrakon Gear, which resembles robotic laser-shooting snakes.

=== Boulderon ===
Voiced by: Tsuguo Mogami (Japanese) Ron Pardo (English)

Paige's Guardian Bakugan. Boulderon's appearance resembles a hybrid of Foxbat, Wilda, Vandarus, Primo Vulcan, and Contestir. His BakuNano is Slingpike.

== Twelve Orders' Bakugan ==
The following Bakugan are owned by the Twelve Orders:

=== Dharak ===
Voiced by: Takaya Kuroda (Japanese); Tony Rosato (English) Barodius' Guardian Bakugan that resembles a quadrupedal dragon and represents a direct descendant of the original Dharaknoid. His Battle Gear is AirKor.

- Phantom Dharak

The evolution of Dharak that was caused by combining Blitz Dragonoid's DNA with Dharak's to forcibly evolve him. Phantom Dharak now walks upright. He is mutated into Razenoid by Code Eve, and he, along with Barodius, who became Mag Mel, were imprisoned inside a flip world of Bakugan Interspace.

- Razenoid

Voiced by: Takaya Kuroda (Japanese); Hadley Kay (English)

The mutated version of Dharak who resembles a dragon/spider hybrid. His mission was to take Drago's Gate to become "whole" again. After get succeeding, he entered into an egg-like cocoon.

- Evolved Razenoid

After complete the Gate and Key through Dan's portion with Code Eve, Razenoid evolved to a humanoid version of himself, making Mag Mel to be whole. He was killed alongside Mag Mel in "The Final Takedown".

=== Lumagrowl ===
Voiced by: Sōichirō Hoshi (Japanese); Dan Petronijevic (English)

Kazarina's Guardian Bakugan. Resembles a six-tailed Kitsune/wolf hybrid. His Battle Gear is Barias Gear. Lumagrowl has a serious attitude when attacking Plitheon and saying how low he was by going against his brawling partner. His most powerful moves come from the use of his tail and lightning.

=== Krakix ===
Voiced by: Unknown (Japanese); Ron Pardo (English)

Gill's Guardian Bakugan that resembles a samurai. His battle gear is Vicer. Kraxix has only talked once by saying "yes master" to Gill.

=== Strikeflier ===
Voiced by: Daichi Endō (Japanese); Scott McCord (English)

Airzel's Guardian Bakugan. Resembles a winged samurai. He also possess' the ability to use his enemies attacks. His Battle Gear is Battle Turbine.

=== Lythirus ===
Voiced by: Eiji Miyashita (Japanese); Shawn Meunier (English)

Stoica's Guardian Bakugan. Resembles a lobster with big claws. His Battle Gear is Razoid.

== Chaos Army's Bakugan ==
The following Bakugan are owned by the Chaos Army:

=== Horridian ===
Anubias' Guardian Bakugan. Resembles a humanoid Cerberus. Its BakuNano is Aeroblaze.

=== Spyron ===
Sellon's Guardian Bakugan that resembles a birdman. Its BakuNano is Daftorix.

=== Bolcanon ===
Anubias' second guardian bakugan. His claws resembles Fear Ripper's claws. His Bakunano is Hyper Pulsor.

=== Krakenoid ===
Anubias' third guardian bakugan that resembles a Kraken. Its Bakunano is Jam Saber. It can fuse body Parts with Krawl.

=== Vertexx ===
Sellon's second guardian bakugan. who resembles an Ogre. His Bakunano is Orehammer.

=== Krowl ===
Sellon's third guardian bakugan and is based on a Spider. Its Bakunano is Slicerix. It can fuse body parts with Krackenoid.

== Gundalian Agents' Bakugan ==
The following Bakugan are owned by the Gundalian Agents:

=== Phosphos ===
Voiced by: Hikaru Midorikawa (Japanese); Andrew Jackson (English)

Lena's Guardian Bakugan that resembles a humanoid hydra. His Battle Gear is Terrorcrest, which resembles giant hands with sharp silver claws.

=== Avior ===
Voiced by: Kimiko Saitō (Japanese); Andrew Sabiston (English)

Mason's Guardian Bakugan that resembles a Wyvern. His Battle Gear is Lashor.

=== Contestir ===
Voiced by: Dai Matsumoto (Japanese); Brad Adamson (English)

Zenet's Guardian Bakugan that resembles a humanoid rhinoceros. In episode 13 of Gundalian Invaders it was revealed that he can change his appearance as seen in his battle with Drago but he can not copy the opponent's battle gear. His Battle Gear is Spartablaster, which resembles giant butterfly wings.

=== Plitheon ===
Voiced by: Eiji Miyashita (Japanese); Andrew Jackson (English)

Jesse's Guardian Bakugan that resembles a dragon/lizard humanoid. His Battle Gear is Vilantor Gear, which resembles giant laser blasters.

== Nonet Bakugan ==
These are evil Bakugan that were banished to the deepest regions of the Doom Dimension by the original Dragonoid and were freed by Wiseman. Later on, they were betrayed after Wiseman's true identity was revealed and he was Coredegon. He was used by Gunz Lazar (except Balista and Worton), but five of them were banished and used as energy for Mechtavius Destroyer. At the Doom Dimension, Betadron fought Drago, but he was defeated. After this, he and Worton now joined the Brawlers and sacrifice themselves in order to get out of the Doom Dimension.

- Betadron

Voiced by: Rob Tinkler

A Baku Sky Raider who is the main guardian of Wiseman and whose purpose is to destroy Drago which is the descendant of the original Dragonoid. His battle suit is Combustoid. Fused with Kodokor and Mutabrid, he becomes Gliderak.

- Kodokor

Voiced by: Brad Adamson

He is the master of aerial attacks of the Nonets and the brother of Betadron.

- Mutabrid

Voiced by: Carman Melville

The brother of Betadron whose attacks can fear even the bravest Bakugan.

- Spatterix

Voiced by: Andrew Jackson

He is the most cautious Bakugan with the Nonets and the one who is rash and savage in battle. Fused with Stronk, he becomes Scorptak.

- Stronk

Voiced by: Ron Rubin

He is the most immature with the Nonets and have argued with Spatterix.

- Worton

Voiced by: Donald Burda

He is the brain and the spiritual leader among the Nonets, usually called "Professor" by his teammates. Fused with Balista, he becomes Volkaos.

- Balista

Voiced by: Andrew Jackson, Rob Tinkler

He was the least trusting Nonet with Wiseman. He called Worton as "all-seeing" and "all-knowing". He later discovered that Wiseman had copied Gunz Lazar's appearance, and became obsessed with discovering Wiseman's true identity. In Enemy Infiltration, he confronts Wiseman over his true identity and demands to know who he really is. Wiseman then reveals his true identity and kills Balista offscreen.

- Tremblar

Voiced by: Rob Tinkler

A dangerous and notorious Bakugan, Tremblar is shielded by sharp defensive blades. When an enemy gets in close proximity, Tremblar immediately detonates his most powerful weapon: a stinging spike shield that cuts through even the toughest of monsters.

== Legendary Soldiers ==
They are Bakugan who defeated an army of Gargonoids long ago. Since then, they have become legends and preside over Vestroia from the Doom Dimension. There is one of each Attribute. When the Battle Brawlers came to the Doom Dimension they were met by the Soldiers and a deal was struck, if all of the Brawlers could defeat the soldier that uses the same attribute as them they would take them out of the Doom Dimension and take all of the Bakugan that Masquerade and his minions sent there. They all won, so the Soldiers had to keep their end of the bargain. In New Vestroia, the Soldiers reappear conversing with Drago and giving him a body, transforming him into Neo Dragonoid, and sending him to the human world to get Dan. Then Vestroia starts to collapse without him and all they can do is wait and discuss. After Drago returns to New Vestroia the Perfect Core becomes stable again and they later appeared to send Drago and the others to Earth. The Six Ancient Warriors then battled Zenoheld after he threatened to destroy the Bakugan if they did not come. Although they had the upper hand, the tide of the battle turned quickly after Zenoheld unleashed the Assail System. They were defeated. Before they could lose their attribute energies, they transferred their power to the Resistance' Bakugan, Disappearing never to be seen again.

- Apollonir

Voiced by: Tetsu Inada (Japanese); Zachary Bennett (English)

He is the legendary Bakugan that resembles a dragon with four sets of wings and humanoid posture. He is the Leader of The Six Legendary Bakugan. In battle, Apollonir is the most powerful Dragonoid Bakugan. Apollonir was the most powerful Dragonoid. He was with a clown who used two Mock Dragonoid to battle against Dan and Drago. When Drago defeated the two Dragonoids, Apollonir left his disguise and prepared to battle Drago. Dan used the ability D-Strike Extreme and repeatedly did that until Drago defeated him. But when Drago still did not evolve, he explained that he needed to defeat all of his friends to further evolve. In the first season, his wings resembled leathery insect wings. When Drago was taken by Spectra while on Earth, Apollonir appeared to Dan in a dream and offered to temporarily become Dan's Guardian Bakugan. During the battle against Spectra, Apollonir easily defeated Helios, but when Drago arrived, he and Dan were backed into a corner, and Dan used Dragon Proudia, turning Apollonir into a trident. Dan then proceeded to throw him, hitting Drago's Perfect Core diamond and freeing him from Spectra's command. Also, Apollonir is revealed to be linked to the Perfect Core, just like Drago, and as such, he has the ability to detect Drago from anywhere on New Vestroia. In Reunion, when Drago says that he can no longer leave New Vestroia due to his link with the Perfect Core, Apollonir explains to Drago that though he is linked to the Perfect Core, he had become strong enough to free himself from it. Apollonir gave his Attribute Energy to Drago just like the other Legendary Soldiers did to the Bakugan belonging to the Resistance. This forced Drago to evolve into Cross Dragonoid. Apollonir's wings now resemble Helix Drago's wings.

- Clayf

Voiced by: Tarō Yamaguchi (Japanese); Ron Pardo (English)

Clayf is the legendary Subterra Bakugan. He resembles shakokidogu and is the strongest. He can drain abilities given to his opponents. He was one of the ones who disapproved of asking the Brawlers for help. He used a fake version of Julie's big sister, Daisy Makimoto, who would always beat her at everything and battles her in a fake abandoned ghost town. He revealed his true form to her, and he looks similar to a Robotallion. He is big with a multi-pronged lochaber axe. Gorem than evolves into Hammer Gorem and Julie learns to stop comparing herself to her sister, passing Clayf's test. He gave his Subterra energy to Thunder Wilda, after a defeat by King Zenoheld, causing him to evolve into Magma Wilda. He disappeared along with the other legendary soldiers after giving his attribute energy to Wilda.

- Lars Lion

Voiced by: Ryōko Ono (Japanese); Julie Lemieux (English)

Legendary Haos Bakugan that resembles an angel-like warrior, Lars Lion is an extremely moral member of The Six Legendary Bakugan. A knight's armor protects her head and body. She uses the golden arrow weapon to bring back defeated Haos soldiers. She was the one who tested Runo. She was originally disguised as an old woman who told Runo where an Illusionary Dan was the person she chose to Brawl Runo was. When she revealed herself, she outright told Runo to stop being so stubborn, but Runo would not listen. She almost won using the most powerful Haos ability card, Sagittarius Arrow. This revives all Bakugan used in the battle that can side with her and uses them to boost her power. She has a basic power level 500 Gs. She was defeated after Runo learned to stop being so stubborn and to listen to her friends, (in the Japanese version, she admitted she loved Dan), and Tigrerra evolved into Blade Tigrerra and used Velocity Fang ability to disable Sagittarius Arrow, lowering Lars Lion's power level by 100 Gs and winning the battle. During Lars Lion's and Runo's battle they do not get to see who wins because when the battle is almost over Lars Lion says that Runo has learned not to be stubborn. A noticeable fact is that Lars Lion's battle form is basically the same as her masked form except Lars Lion wears a mask in her masked form while observing Runo's battle against the fake young Dan. Lars Lion gave her Haos Energy to Mega Nemus, which forced Nemus to evolve into Saint Nemus.

- Exedra

Voiced by: Hiroyuki Kinoshita (Japanese); Pete Cugno (English)

Exedra is the legendary Darkus Bakugan. He resembles a Lernaean Hydra and is the most powerful. He can drain power from teammates, but then turns them to stone. Exedra, the Darkus Legendary Soldier, battled Masquerade with an illusionary "Alice Gehabich" using the most powerful Darkus abilities, Demon Wizard and Final Wizard. He is defeated by Masquerade with a combo with Dual Hydranoid. This caused Dual Hydranoid to evolve to Alpha Hydranoid. Exedra gave his Darkus Energy to Percival, which forced Percival to evolve into Midnight Percival.

- Frosch

Voiced by: Tetsuo Satō (Japanese); Scott McCord (English)

He is the legendary Bakugan bringing sage wisdom into play. He is the wisest and the most tactical of The Six Legendary Bakugan. He is a gigantic frog-like creature with huge legs for fast maneuverability and a long whipping tongue. In battle, Frosch produces a water tornado to overcome its enemies. He was originally disguised as a frog man who needed water and had Marucho get it for him. He then revealed himself to be Frosch and conjured up an Illusionary Marucho to use. This version of Marucho was the version that did everything his parents told him to do. This made Marucho realize that he needed to accept how his past allowed him to become who he is today and Marucho gained Preyas II. Frosch was defeated by Preyas when he was on the triple battle card and teamed up with Diablo. After nearly losing to King Zenoheld, Frosch gave his attribute energy to Elfin, causing her to evolve into Minx Elfin.

- Oberus

Voiced by: Yuka Iguchi (Japanese); Katie Griffin (English)

Oberus is the legendary Ventus Bakugan. She resembles a beaked head with moth-like wings. She is the most compassionate. The Sixth Soldier of Ventus, she is immensely powerful. Oberus can boost its power to defeat an enemy, but can only defeat one opponent at a time in return for the power boost. She is one of the only two soldiers that are female along with Lars Lion. In her masked form, she takes the form of a maiden in green clothing. Oberus battles Shun in 'A Place Far From Home' under the control of a younger version of Shun's mother. This caught Shun very off guard and upset him very much due to his mother's current state and how happy this version was. She uses the ultimate Ventus ability card, Turmoil, to boost her power level of 500 Gs to 700 Gs but can only defeat one Bakugan in return for this massive power boost. She was defeated after Skyress evolved into Storm Skyress and used the 'Destruction Meteor Storm' ability card to boost her power by 200 Gs. Oberus gave her Ventus Energy to Ingram, which forced Ingram to evolve into Master Ingram.

== Colossus Dragonoid ==
Voiced by: Jūrōta Kosugi (Japanese); William Colgate (English)

Colossus Dragonoid was as an ancient, giant and living Mechanical Bakugan born on Neathia to protect the Sacred Orb; and considered Dan's second partner, along with Drago. He also can combine with four Battle Gears for Blitz Dragonoid's use (Blasteroid, Nukix, Beamblitzer and Axator) to become Dragonoid Colossus. He first appeared in "Dragonoid Colossus", for when Linehalt's Forbidden Power was destroying Neathia, Dragonoid Colossus was called upon as the Sacred Orb's last defense. He then subdued Linehalt, thus ceasing the Forbidden Power. After that, he then entered an unconscious Dan's BakuMeter. In "Genesis", Dragonoid Colossus teleports Dan and Drago to a place in between dimensions. In order to return to Neathia, Dan and Drago must battle Dragonoid Colossus. Dragonoid Colossus beat them with ease the first time, but Dan and Drago finally beat him using Explosix and Jakalier. After being defeated, Dragonoid Colossus explains to both Dan and Drago about the origins of the Bakugan, their descendants, and the ultimate warrior gene. For defeating him, Dragonoid Colossus rewarded Drago by evolving him into Blitz Dragonoid. He then teleports back to Neathia with Dan, Drago, Nurzak, and Mason. After that, Dragonoid Colossus takes the Brawlers, Nurzak, and Mason to Gundalia to rescue Jake and Ren's teammates. In "Code Eve" Dragonoid Colossus was helping Dan reach the Sacred Orb Chamber, but then Stoica and Lythirius got onto him and blinded him with acid bubbles. He then drops Dan to the palace, for he needed to go ahead by himself. Just then, Phantom Dharak strikes at Dragonoid Colossus, Stoica, and Lythius, all being killed by the blast.

== Ally Bakugan ==
=== Neo Ziperator ===
Voiced by: Yoshihisa Kawahara (Japanese); Carman Melville (English)

Linus' partner Bakugan and keeper of the Element. He resembles a humanoid dragon. He is taken by Jesse and dies after giving Drago the Element. He appears in Linus' dreams to give one final goodbye. Like Wavern, Zip Zam dies giving Drago an object of great power that causes his evolution and ultimately dies as a result.

=== Raptorix ===
Captrain Elright's partner Bakugan. It resembles a humanoid hawk. Raptorix is revealed to be his partner after he escapes Gundalian capture and joins the battle with Fabia.

=== Sabator ===
Voiced by: Tsuguo Mogami (Japanese); Hadley Kay (English) (14) Matthew Hawkins (19, 21, 32), Andrew Jackson (37, 38)

Nurzak's Guardian Bakugan that resembles a minotaur. His Battle Gear is Chompixx.

== Mechanical Bakugan ==
The Mechanical Bakugan are artificial Bakugan that were created by the Vexos (namely Professor Clay). Besides the Mechanical Bakugan owned by the Vexos, among the known Mechanical Bakugan are:

- Fencer - A spider-like Pyrus Mechanical Bakugan. (resembles Metalfencer and Spyderfencer, except that it is a ball not a trap). This four-legged creature runs extremely fast and battles with its front bladed legs. Blinding light shoots from its center blue eye to stun challengers during battle. Its long whipping tail has a blaster on the tip that can rip through its opposition. Fencer has extremely strong pincers that are impossible to break free from.
- Foxbat - A Darkus Mechanical Bakugan who is one of the components of Maxus Helios. This bat-like creature has gigantic wings that allow it to fly to great heights quickly. Its wings can cover its entire body for protection. Its feet have deadly claws to rip through armor. Although its eyesight is poor during daylight, Foxbat can spot a foe in the darkest of places.
- Hexados - Gus's Bakugan Trap. He is shaped like a cylinder. He resembles a worm. He can wrap around his opponent with his 'Land Twist' ability. Sacrificed himself to save Vulcan from Farbros in "Avenging Spectra".
- Klawgor - A Ventus Mechanical Bakugan who is one of the components of Maxus Helios. Although small, this Bakugan opens up into multiple layers with attack hardware. Its two spider-like legs have deadly spikes covering them. A tail launches fire blasts from its duel blaster tail. Sharp pinchers help Klawgor to weaken its foes before destroying its opponents with a deadly blow from its tail.
- Leefram - An Aquos snake-like creature who is one of the components of Maxus Helios. Leefram as two arms with sickles for hands. A deadly sharp horn projects from the top of its head, while venomous fangs stick out from its mouth. Leefram has the ability to stand tall by contorting its body, this allows for attacks that are fast and ferocious.
- Scraper - A Subterra Mechanical Bakugan who is one of the components of Maxus Helios. This monster quickly scurries along the ground by using its massive legs. It has a quick whipping tail with two spikes on the end that can penetrate any type of armor. Horns and fangs help protect its head during battle.
- Spindle - A Haos Mechanical Bakugan that resembles a snake-like creature with two massive mechanical claws to shred its challenger. It is one of the components of Maxus Helios. A multiple barrel blaster-ray protrudes from its back, which when fired can eliminate multiple Bakugans. Its body is made up of the latest metallic fiber that is both light and durable.

== Bakugan Traps ==
The Bakugan Traps are shaped differently than the Bakugan and come with one attribute with a second attribute hidden inside. They can be activated when the Gate Card has been flipped up. Among the known Bakugan Traps are:

- Assail System - A Mechanical Bakugan Trap which combines specifically with Farbros. It is similar to Battle Gear. The Assail System comes out of nowhere and combines with Farbros. When combined with Farbros, Farbros gains 4200 Gs and is called Assail Farbros. It was created by Professor Clay for King Zenoheld, in episode 50 the Assail System comes off Farbros and is replaced with The Alternative Weapon System. When it comes out of nowhere, it is in two parts. It has been scattered across the galaxy.
- Baliton - Mira's Ankylosaurus-like Bakugan Trap in the shape of a sphere with spikes around it. Baliton merges with Wilda during battles. Like Wilda, he is slow to move, but he uses massive weight to crush his foe. His brown exterior is the perfect camouflage when battling in the desert. Horns cover his body from head to tail, and his multi-horned tail with sharp nails at the end can swing around like a baseball bat.
- Brachium - A Haos Trap who is one of the components of Maxus Dragonoid. It is a mechanical worm that has two heads at both ends of its body. The heads have wrench-like grabbers with blasters that zap energy. Its metal exoskeleton gives it superior protection. Additionally, Brachium has the ability to use its body like a whip to stun its opponents as well has wrap around its opponents making them defenseless and easy to defeat.
- Dark Hound - A Darkus Trap that gives the ability to change a Bakugan's attribute. It resembles a mechanical dog and is one of the components of Maxus Dragonoid. It is the fastest of all the Bakugan Traps and can sniff out opponents who are hiding.
- Dynamo (Drone Spider) - Volt's Mechanical Bakugan Trap. He is shaped like a hexagonal prism and resembles a tarantula. He can fire dangerous lasers with his 'Gillion Cords' ability. Dynamo links up with Brontes to form Dynamo Brontes. If another Bakugan looks into his red eyes, that Bakugan falls into a trance and becomes defenseless. Dynamo uses his large pincers to grasp and thrash opponents around, and his six legs make him extremely maneuverable. He also links with Boriates with his Battle Arm Mode.
- Falcon Fly - Ace's Bakugan Trap that Percival can stand and ride on it. It takes the shape of a rectangular prism in Trap form. Falcon Fly is a Bakugan Trap that combines with Percival. Its large wings make it quicker than a dragonfly while its dark color makes it difficult to see at night. It has a very thin body that makes it almost invisible when attacking straight on. To destroy its enemies, Falcon Fly shoots laser blasts from its eyes. The pattern on its body and tail is similar to the pattern on AirKor's wings.
  - Flash Falcon Fly (Rad Fly) - The evolution of Falcon Fly, Ace called it "Rad Fly" for short and it helped finish Ace's battle with Billy and Julie by using "Darkus Fly Arrow". It now has jet-like materialed wings and helicopter legs at the bottom. Its rectangular shape is now a little deformed. It is also the first trap Bakugan to ever evolve.
- Fortress - Shadow's Mechanical Bakugan Trap. He is shaped like a rounded cube. He resembles a war robot. He can shower down lasers with his 'Proton Rain' ability. Although its name is the same, it not related to Chan Lee's Pyrus Fortress. It also resembles Laserman. The Alternative is equipped with Fourtress armies, led by Zenoheld and Clay.
- Grafias - An Aquos Trap who is one of the components of Maxus Dragonoid. It resembles a mechanical snake that has a wrench-like clamp to grab onto its enemies and can hear its foes coming from miles away.
- Grakas Hound - A Subterra Trap that is a mechanical dog-like creature with a vicious growl. It is one of the components of Maxus Dragonoid. His bite can rip through the toughest metal.
- Hexstar (Carlvelt) - Volt's second Mechanical Bakugan Trap, a robotic version of Baliton. It walks on all four of its legs and is one of the strongest Bakugan. The spikes covering its back provides ultimate protection. Hexstar uses its thorny tail to ward off enemies. Its massive strength can take on the toughest of opponents. Hexstar can also let Boriates stand on it and form a brutal brawler.
- Hylash (Slash) - Shun's Bakugan Trap. He is shaped like a cylinder and resembles a warrior. He has huge shields attached to his shoulders for protection and spikes protruding from his chest to pulverize enemies. His massive legs allow him to run in circles around slower opponents. Beams of light shoot from the diamond on his forehead to destroy enemies. He and Ingram transform into their High Mobility Mode. Destroyed in episode 51.
- Metalfencer - Spectra's Bakugan Trap. He takes the form of a mechanical spider with three blue eyes that can freeze opponents, making them easy to defeat. His long tail can, not only can shoot lasers, but it can also wrap and squeeze his opponents tightly, eliminating them with its deadly stinger. His four mighty legs provide tremendous maneuverability. Metalfencer can assume Battle Unit Mode to enhance Viper Helios's fighting skills.
- Piercian (Guardian) - Baron's Bakugan Trap and is in the shape of a cube. It is similar to another trap Zoack. In episodes 23 and 36, Baron says "Guardian" instead of Piercian. This could be like Shun's Trap Hylash, who he nicknamed Slash. It does not have a known evolution. Piercian is a Bakugan trap that connects with Nemus to create a dynamic one, two punch. He has two colossal shields attached to his forearms for protection, which he can also throw like discs to crush his challengers. The shields can also be used as mirrors that reflect Nemus's light rays. Piercian's towering block legs provide tremendous stability to sustain the mightiest of punches.
- Scorpion - Dan's Bakugan Trap. He is shaped like a coin. He resembles a scorpion. He can rise up on his six legs to tower over his enemy. He has two colossal pinchers with metal spiked balls and a long tail with an especially deadly pointer that can snap like a whip. His exoskeleton shell protects his insides from damage during battle.
- Spitarm - A Ventus Trap in the form of a manta ray and is one of the components of Maxus Dragonoid. It can fly, scouting its territory for enemies. A deadly venom is carried on its small stinger for defeating opponents.
- Spyderfencer - A spider-like Pyrus Bakugan Trap and one of the components of Maxus Dragonoid. Small in size, he can hide in small places for surprise attacks.
- Tripod Epsilon - Marucho's Bakugan Trap. He is shaped like a triangular pyramid. His Bakugan form resembles a big frog with a snail on the huge leaf it carries. He can also use 'Aquos, Subterra and Haos' abilities.
- Tripod Theta - Mylene's Bakugan Trap. He is shaped like a triangular pyramid. He resembles a land walking version of Neptune. He can use 'Aquos, Darkus, and Ventus' abilities. Only seen in Marucho's Mission and burnt out by Ingram.
- Wired - Lync's Mechanical Bakugan Trap. He is shaped like a ridged sphere. He resembles a "small" mechanical bird. He can make it shower acid-like energy with his 'Shower Harpoon' ability. Wired also combines with Altair into Meta Altair. They both were burned out by Nemus in Gate Crashers.

=== Battle Gear ===
- Exokor - A deluxe Battle Gear. It is Dharak's giant vehicle that combines with two other scorpion-like monsters Riptor and Smashtor.

== Mechtogan ==
The Mechtogan are bio-mechanical creatures that are supported by the Mechtogan Aviator. They are a "physical manifestation of an ability" are the result of a brawler and a Bakugan falling out of sync. They can be controlled when a brawler and a Bakugan regain their sync.

- Accelerak

Voiced by: Dan Petronijevic

Tristar's Mechtogan, summoned when Drago gave Tristar some of Code Eve's power along with Taylean, Boulderon, and Wolfurio.

- Braxion - The fourth Mechtogan that appear in the anime. It is Sellon's Mechtogan.
- Chromopode

Voiced by: Unknown

The Mechtogan of Reptak, who first appears in Beginning of the End and created from the last 10% of the energy reserve of the Dragonoid Destroyer.

- Coredegon

Voiced by: Tsuyoshi Koyama (Japanese) Tyrone Savage, Rob Tinkler (as Wiseman)

Originally a Mechtogan created in the Doom Dimension by a Nonet Bakugan called Fury, Coredegon destroyed his creator and said that he is a Mechtogan with his own free will and he wants to destroy all Bakugan and create an army of Mechtogan. He then arrived in Bakugan City and brought an army of evil Mechtogan to attack and take over Earth. Coredegon then became Mechtavius Destroyer along with his pals Exostriker, Mandibor, and Slycerak, but he was later defeated by Dragonoid Destroyer. However, Coredegon kidnapped Gunz and absorbed his energy to copy his human form and mannerisms, starting to call himself "Wiseman". He also knows the story about the original Dragonoid and how Drago is its descendant. He freed the Nonet Bakugan from the Doom Dimension and tricked them into helping him re-summon Mechtavius Destroyer so he could defeat the Battle Brawlers. He ended up getting defeated when Dragonoid Destroyer was summoned and helped Jaakor and Reptak boost their power. In Mysterious Bond, he fought Dan Kuso using Betadron, Kodokor and Mutabrid and formed Gliderak. Even though he defeated Drago and Reptak's Bakugan Battle Suits, he lost when Reptak and Drago formed Aeroblitz. In The Prodigal Bakugan, he fought Shun and Jaakor as well as Orbeum and Skytruss using Spatterix and Stronk. In Combination Impossible, he used Balista and Worton against Radizen. In Enemy Allies, he summoned Coredegon and the other Mechtogan to fight the Battle Brawlers but ended up losing. In Battle for Bakugan Land, he fought Dan using Scorptak. He was winning until Dan used Drago and Reptak's Battle Suits, and Dan won the battle. In Gunz Blazing, he disguised as Gunz Lazar to confuse the Brawlers that he is Gunz. He stole some Battle Suits Data. He battles Dan with his Haos Tremblar. He wins the first round against Reptak, but loses from Dragonoid Destroyer and Reptak in the next round. In Battle Suit Bash, he fought the brawlers using Betadron, Kodokor, and Mutabrid using the stolen Battle Suits Clawbruk, Fortatron, and Combustoid. It was revealed in the end of the episode that he isn't Gunz. He's a mysterious being who stole Gunz's appearance and battling style. In Countdown to Doomsday, he battle the brawlers once more in a huge battle with all the Nonets and combinations with them. Later in the battle, he summons Coredegon, Slycerak, Exostriker, and Mandibor to combine into Mechtavius Destroyer and wins the battle for the first time against the Battle Brawlers. In "End Of The Line," Coredegon, Slycerrak, Exostricker, and Mandibor are later destroyed by Drago and Dragonoid Destroyer.

- Deezall - One of 3 Mechtogan being the 7th seen, along with Miserak and Rockfist.
- Dreadeon

Voiced by: Tony Rosato

Razenoid's Mechtogan. The second Mechtogan that appear to be taken down by Razenoid on a first strike. Then it was summoned to battle Zenthon.

- Exostriker

Voiced by: Ron Rubin

He is the most defensive and most lethal in battle along with the Nonets' Mechtogans. He forms the left leg of the Destroyer. He later died in "End Of The Line."

- Flytris - Radizen's Mechtogan. It combined with Thorak to create Duomechtra.
- Mandibor

Voiced by: Hadley Kay

He is indimidating and frightening threat among the Nonets' Mechtogan. He forms the right leg of the Destroyer. He later died in "End Of The Line."

- Miserak - The 2nd out of 3 Mechtogan being the 8th seen, along with Rockfist and Deezal.
- Rockfist - The 3rd out of 3 Mechtogan being the 9th seen, along with Deezal and Miserak.
- Silent Strike

Voiced by: Scott Gorman

Taylean's Mechtogan. It resembles a mixture of a Viking and a ninja. His Mechtogan Titan is Faser Titan.

- Slycerak

Voiced by: Andrew Jackson

He is the agile and nimble Mechtogan in the Nonets' Mechtogans. He forms the right hand of the Destroyer. He later died in "End Of The Line."

- Slynix - Infinity Helios's Mechtogan. Vicious long spikes shoot out from his hands, making him a dangerous opponent at close quarters. Reinforced vertical shoulder armor opens to reveal devastating weaponry. Slynix lowers his single horned head into optimal fighting position once he's fully armed and ready to attack.
- Smasheon - The fifth Mechtogan that is in ownership of Anubias. His true Mechtogan.
- Swift Sweep

Voiced by: Scott McCord

Wolfurio's Mechtogan, summoned when Drago gave some of Code Eve's power to Wolfurio.

- Thorak - Jaakor's Mechtogan. It combines with Flytris to create Duomechtra.
- Venexus - The third Mechtogan given by Mag Mel to Anubias in order to defeat Dan and Drago.
- Vexfist

Voiced by: Stephen R. Hart

Boulderon's Mechtogan, summoned when Drago gave Boulderon some of Code Eve's power.

- Zenthon

Voiced by: Andrew Jackson

Titanium Dragonoid's Mechtogan. Infused with dragon-like abilities, Zenthon flies at super-speed and spews white hot fire at his opponents. He has several cannons coming out when he transforms. His Mechtogan Titan is Zenthon Titan. Zenthon and Zenthon Titan later died in The final battle.

=== Mechtogan Combination ===
- Duomechtra - It is the first Mechtogan combination seen in the anime. It is the combination of Flytris and Thorak.

== Mechtogan Destroyer ==
- Dragonoid Destroyer

Voiced by: Shawn Meunier

Fusion Dragonoid's Mechtogan Destroyer. He could launch a devastating attack and can attack if Drago goes into the hub of the Destroyer. It is also revealed that his true idendity is Genesis Dragonoid, one of the two original Bakugan who banished the Nonets to the Doom Dimension.

- Mechtavius Destroyer

Voiced by: Tyrone Savage

The Mechtogan Destroyer of Wiseman, now Coredegon. It is the 4-in-1 Mechtogan Destroyer which made up of Coredegon, Exostriker, Mandibor, and Slycerak. It was destroyed in End of the Line by Drago and Dragonoid Destroyer before it could wipe out the universe, screaming in anguish at being overpowered as it disintegrated, never to threaten anyone ever again.

=== Mechtogan Titan ===
- Dreadeon Titan (Razen Titan) - The 2nd Mechtogan Tiitan seen in the anime. It is seen behind Razenoid in episode 14.
- Silent Strike Titan (Faser Titan) - Its Shun's Mechtogan Titan, appears in episode 25: Dark Moon.
- Venexus Titan - The 3rd Mechtogan Titan seen in the anime. Used by Anubias in episode 22, Unfinished business.
- Zenthon Titan - Zenthon Titan is the 1st Mechtogan Titan to be seen in the anime. It is Dan and Drago's 2nd Mechtogan And Zenthon's Titan Form.

== Video Game Bakugan ==
The following Bakugan are exclusive to the video games:

=== Leonidas ===
Voiced by: Scott McCord

He is a one-of-a-kind dragon-like Bakugan who was born in the Doom Dimension, in the first video game (his only appearance). He is able to have any attribute, and the Leonidas and Omega Leonidas Gate Cards and the 'Alpha Blaster' and 'Omega Eraser' Ability Cards.

- Omega Leonidas

The only existing evolution of Leonidas in the Bakugan video game. It evolves to counter the immense power of Battle Ax Vladitor, staying as the player's Guardian Bakugan even after fading upon Vladitor's defeat.

=== Vladitor ===
Voiced by: Ron Pardo

He was banished to the Doom Dimension when he tried to take over Vestroia. When Naga took the Silent Core he was freed and he traveled to Earth. He has sharp horns and incredible strength as well as an armored covered body. He is Marduk's Guardian Bakugan.

- Battle Axe Vladitor

The evolved form of Vladitor, after he absorbed the Silent Orb (a tiny version from the Silent Core), and is still in service to Marduk, the masked villain's Guardian Bakugan. When both Bakugan faded and left their partners alone, it was Battle Ax Vladitor's remaining strength and tiny portion of good heart that brought Leonidas back to life.

== Manga Bakugan ==
The following Bakugan are exclusive to the manga:

=== Chamelia ===
A Non-attributed chameleon-like Bakugan and was one of Katie's Guardian Bakugan. It was sent to the Doom Dimension by Masquerade and Mecha Chamelia took his place in the arena, and more importantly as Katie's Guardian. Drago had said that most Chamelia's were already extinct from being to weak. They have abilities of their own and are only capable of using abilities copied from their opponent.

- Mecha Chamelia

A Mechanical Bakugan from The Evo Tournament. He was created to replace Katie's Chamelia after she lost to Masquerade (maybe is Chamelia's resurrection). It, like a regular Chamelia, has the ability to copy an opponent's Bakugan and their ability cards. It was deleting people's memories of their Bakugan, and caused many people, including Dan, Shun, and Julie, to forget that their Bakugan could talk. It also completely wiped out many Bakugan's memories, causing the Bakugan affected to be unable to speak. In actuality, Mecha Chamelia had been symphoning G powers from Bakugan in the Evo Tournament to increase his own strength (memory loss was an unintentional side effect). After being defeated by Dan and Runo, Mecha Chamelia apologizes and asks Katie if he will be deactivated. Katie decides not to, provided he does not pull the same stunt again.

=== Flare Dragaon ===
He is Harubaru Hinode's Guardian Bakugan in The Manga Bakutech Bakugan who evolves into Gren Dragaon, Rise Dragaon, then Jigen Dragaon.

== Other Bakugan ==
- 5th Paladin - A Spartan-like Bakugan army with a lot of armor and a large shield. They are commanded by Hal-G. There are five of them that loyally protect Naga after he is attacked by Drago. However, when the other Brawlers join in the battle, their Bakugan manage to destroy them all.
- Abis Omega - A serpent-like Bakugan.
- Amazon - Preyas's "student". He had apparently chosen Drago's old training spot to do his own training. When Drago arrives, Amazon begins taunting him, calling him an old man and immediately asks Drago for a battle, having heard all about Drago from Preyas. Drago is hesitant as he is clearly worried about losing control but agrees when Dan points out that it may be different as they are now battling in the real world. Amazon ends up winning the battle when Dan and Drago pass out from another vision of Mag Mel and Razenoid. Preyas, clearly concerned that something is wrong with Drago, leaves with Amazon, letting Drago rest. When Dan tries to explain to him about Drago's powers, Amazon does not seem to care about holding back and what he would do if he had Drago's power. Later, he and Dan rush to find Drago when Dan senses an evil presence in New Vestroia. He gets scared easily when he sees Drago out of control. Later, he and Preyas hold off Venexus until Zenthon makes the save. He comments later on how awesome and powerful Dan and Drago are when battling together. He was later killed by Mechtavius Destroyer in Blast From the Past, but was resurrected when the Brawlers went back in time to stop Mechtavius Destroyer from destroying the universe.
- Anchorsaur - A dinosaur-like Bakugan with gems embedded in its shoulders and armor on its legs, shoulders, and arms.
- Atchibee - A moth-like Bakugan.
- Atmos - A falcon-like Bakugan.
- Bee Striker - A bee-like Bakugan.
- Brachiosaur - A dinosaur-like Bakugan.
- Buz Hornix - A hornet-like Bakugan that's similar to Bee Striker.
- Centipoid - A centipede-like Bakugan.
- Chaos Bakugan - Artificial Bakugan created by Mag Mel and Razenoid to cause havoc and gain more Chaos Energy. There are varieted in all six attributes.
  - Cyclone Percival - A Chaos Bakugan based on Ace's Percival. It is usually Darkus, but the Tri-twisters also used a Pyrus and Haos, and Sellon once used an Aquos.
  - Flash Ingram - A dragon-like Chaos Bakugan given to the Bash brothers as a gift from Mag Mel and have a razenoid symbol on their chest. Although usually ventus, Sellon used one of all attributes. They were named after Shun's Ingram even though they are nothing like Ingram. Their Bakunano is Shoxrox (Coin Blaster).
  - Iron Dragonoid - Resembles the original Dragonoid (hints the name). Usually used by Anubias, although most of them are Subterra, Anubias has used a Darkus and a Pyrus.
- Clawcer - A crab-like Bakugan similar to Terrorclaw.
- Clawsaurus - An insect-like Bakugan with a big claw.
- Damakor - A four-legged reptile-like Bakugan.
- Damdos

Voiced by: Takashi Nagasako (Japanese); Andrew Jackson (actor) (English)

He is the one who build Bakugan Land. He appears to be short-tempered and doesn't enjoy the presence of humans. His good nature is rekindled by defending them from Wiseman and protecting Julie from a falling statute.

- El Condor - A shaman-like Bakugan.
- Falconeer - A humanoid falcon-like Bakugan that's said to resemble the Egyptian god Ra.
- Fangoid - A dragon-like Bakugan.
- Farakspin - A dragonfly-like Bakugan.
- Fear Ripper - A humanoid Bakugan with large extending claws.
- Fly Beetle - A beetle-like Bakugan that can fly.
- Freezer - A squid-like Bakugan.
- Fury - He is one of the Nonets who created Coredegon and other Mechtogan. However, he ended up destroyed by Coredegon who betrays his master.
- Gargonoid - A gargoyle-like Bakugan.
- Genesis Dragonoid - The Original Dragonoid which created New Vestroia.
- Goblinball - A goblin-like Bakugan that flies & has an eye inside its mouth.
- Glotronoid - A dragonoid-like Bakugan.
- Griffon - A Chimera-like Bakugan with the head and front legs of a lion, the wings of an eagle, the back legs of a goat, and a snake-headed tail.
- Gren - A walrus-like Bakugan.
- Hakapoid - An aquatic demon-like Bakugan.
- Hammersaur - A dinosaur-like Bakugan with hammer-like hands. Similar to Anchorsaur.
- Hynoid - A hyena-like Bakugan.
- Jelldon - A jellyfish-like Bakugan.
- Jetro - A robotic octopus-like Bakugan with big ears.
- Juggernoid - A turtle-like Bakugan. One Juggernoid is the partner of Christopher.
- Laserman - One of Masquerade's favorite Bakugan to send opponents to the Doom Dimension. He is a giant of a monster with three laser cannons atop his shoulders. Each cannon has its own unique laser that can extinguish fire, freeze water, and explode rock.
- Limulus - A trilobite-like Bakugan.
- Longfly - A fly-like Bakugan.
- Lumitroid - A scorpion-like Bakugan with a big glowing eye.
- Luxtor - A worm-like Bakugan with four eyes.
- Manion - A sphinx-like Bakugan.
- Mantris - A mantis-like Bakugan.
- Megarus - A swordfish-like Bakugan.
- Merlix - A wizard-like Bakugan used by Fabia Sheen. He rolls a dice when opened.
- Monarus - A fairy-like Bakugan.
- Nastix - A blob-like Bakugan who looks like a slug.
- Nova Lion

Voiced by: Unknown (Japanese); John Stocker (English)

He was the oldest Bakugan in Vestroia and a Pyrus version of Tigrerra. He helped Dan and Drago fight Centorrior and Druman, but was later defeated, then fell into lava. He survived as he is a Pyrus Bakugan, but he was then killed in a later battle against Centorrior and Druman. When he first rescued Dan and Drago, he took them to his home in a cave at the base of a large cliff. There, Drago figures out that this is not just an ordinary Bakugan who has saved them, but as Nova Lion later confirms with a chuckle, he is the oldest Bakugan in existence. Unfortunately, they would later battle Centorrior and Druman and Nova Lion would die defending Drago who he foresaw to be the next great leader of Vestroia and more: the Perfect Core of Vestroia. He also told him about how Naga and Wavern came to be and how the new Bakugan were created. He appeared in a flashback in episode 42 as one of the many Bakugan who gave up their lives to save Vestroia.

- Rafflesian - A flower-like Bakugan.
- Ramdol - A dragon-like Bakugan in the shape of a motorcycle.
- Raptorix - A humanoid hawk-like Bakugan that spins.
- Rattleoid - A rattlesnake-like Bakugan.
- Ravenoid - A humanoid raven-like Bakugan.
- Reaper

Voiced by: Susumu Akagi (Japanese); Peter Cugno (English)

A Bakugan that resembles the Grim Reaper. Reaper came from the Darkus world of Vestroia & became the first Guardian of Masquerade. He was borrowed by other Darkus Brawlers who teamed with Masquerade for a short period of time before being sent to the Doom Dimension by Masquerade. Drago briefly encountered him there in the episode "The Brawler's Last Stand" after being defeated by Dual Hydranoid. He is presumed to be out of Doom Dimension due to the deal made by the Brawlers and the Six Legendary Soldiers of Vestroia.

- Robotallion - A humanoid robot Bakugan.
- Saurus - A humanoid Styracosaurus Bakugan.
- Scaboid - A mechanical insect-like Bakugan.
- Serpenoid - A snake-like Bakugan.
- Shadow Wing - Shun's second Bakugan created by Master Ingram when he uses the "Shadow Wing" ability. They can combine each other in his Ninjitsu Mode.
- Siege - A knight-like Bakugan. His weapon varies based on the attribute he is under.
- Skytruss and Orbeum

Skytruss Voiced by: Peter Cugno
Orbeum Voiced by: Graeme Cornies

These are Shun's first Darkus Bakugan that are swift and have great performance in battle. They are the students of Jaakor.

- Snapzoid - A dragon/centipede-like Bakugan with a second head.
- Spidaro - A mutant spider-like Bakugan.
- Splight - A futuristic warrior-like Bakugan.
- Stinglash - A scorpion-like Bakugan with a human head.
- Stug - A hermit crab-like Bakugan.
- Tuskor - A four tusked elephant-like Bakugan.
- Tuskus - A Triceratops-like Bakugan.
- Terrorclaw - A crab-like Bakugan.
- Venoclaw - A treasure chest-like Bakugan with two long arms.
- Ventoraptor - A dinosaur-like Bakugan.
- Verias - A gorilla-like Bakugan.
- Volt Elezoid - A sea anemone-like Bakugan that's similar to Rafflesian.
- Warius - An ogre-like Bakugan.
- Wontu - A rabbit/penguin-like Bakugan.
- Wormquake - A giant worm-like Bakugan.
- Ziperator - A humanoid mosquito-like Bakugan.
