= Draco Peak =

Mountain in Alberta, Canada

Coordinates: 53.48329°N 119.66926°W

Draco Peak is a summit in Alberta, Canada.

Draco Peak was so named on account of its dragon-shaped outline, draco meaning "dragon" in Latin.
