= Dragovići, Vareš =

Village in Vareš, Bosnia and Herzegovina

Dragovići
- Village
- Location within Bosnia and Herzegovina
- Coordinates: 44.1485278°N 18.228927°E
- Country: Bosnia and Herzegovina
- Entity: Federation of Bosnia and Herzegovina
- Canton: Zenica-Doboj
- Municipality: Vareš

Area
  - Total: 2.95 sq mi (7.65 km^{2})

Population (2013)
  - Total: 125
  - Density: 42.3/sq mi (16.3/km^{2})
- Time zone: UTC+1 (CET)
  - Summer (DST): UTC+2 (CEST)

Dragovići is a village in the municipality of Vareš, Bosnia and Herzegovina.

== Demographics ==
According to the 2013 census, its population was 125, all Bosniaks.
