= Bakugan: Defenders of the Core =

2010 video game

- Developer: Now Production
- Publishers: JP: Sega; WW: Activision
- Platforms: PlayStation 3 Xbox 360; Wii; PlayStation Portable; Nintendo DS
- Release: NA: October 26, 2010; AU: October 27, 2010 (DS, PS3, Wii, X360); EU: October 29, 2010; JP: December 9, 2010 (DS)

Bakugan: Defenders of the Core is a multi-console action-adventure game released in 2010. Despite its title, it is based on Bakugan: New Vestroia. It was released for the DS, Wii, PSP, PS3 and Xbox 360.

Bakugan: Defenders of the Core will bring gamers into a fast binding action adventure to save the Earth and New Vestroia from Zenoheld, Spectra, and their Vexos minions.

== Plot ==
The game follows a separate story arc from the anime, in which the Resistance must protect Earth from a furious assault by the Vexos who are slowly taking over in order to destroy all of the Resistance's havens and Drago who contains the Perfect Core that the Vexos are searching for.

== Gameplay ==
The gameplay is split into 2 sections; stealth sections wherein the player sneaks around enemy occupied-territory, and Third-person brawler sections centered around mixing light and heavy combos

=== Story Mode ===
In Story Mode the player travels the world to collect Core Fragments while evading security drones. Bakugan are used to disarm laser traps and other security devices.

=== Battle Mode ===
Battle Mode uses a fighting engine similar to Dragon Ball Z games and ability cards that are used to make powerful attacks. Bakugan can be captured, of which twenty can be used in Battle Mode. And Features 3 different gamemodes

== Reception ==
The DS, PS3 and Xbox 360 versions of Defenders of the Core received "mixed" reviews according to Metacritic. In Japan, Famitsu gave the DS version a score of three sevens and one six for a total of 27 out of 40.

Bakugan: Defenders of the Core

Aggregate scores
Aggregator	Score			
Aggregator	DS	PS3	PSP	Xbox 360
GameRankings	65%	63%	82%	70%
Metacritic	65/100	50/100	N/A	62/100

Review scores
Publication	Score			
Publication	DS	PS3	PSP	Xbox 360
Famitsu	27/40	N/A	N/A	N/A
GameZone	6.5/10	N/A	N/A	7/10

The PlayStation Portable received positive reviews according to Game Rankings.
